= Youngstown dynamite plot =

1918 American anarchist communist plot to transport dynamite

The Youngstown dynamite plot was a foiled attempt by Galleanist anarchist communists to move a case of dynamite by train from Steubenville, Ohio, to Chicago, from January 17–18, 1918. The 18-year-old Gabriella "Ella" Antolini Segata, part of the Italian Galleanist circle, was caught by a suspicious train porter. The dynamite was potentially en route to Milwaukee, where anarchists had been squaring off with police in a series of counter-retaliatory attacks stemming from the September 1917 Bay View incident. Antolini Segata was imprisoned for 18 months and the case was a big break for the Bureau of Investigation agent Rayme Weston Finch, who would come to lead investigations against the Galleanists.

== Background ==
During the Bay View incident, in September 1917, Milwaukee anarchists and police clashed following a pro-American entry into World War I rally confrontation and subsequent crackdown in which 11 anarchists were arrested. A retaliatory bomb was retrieved from an area of church and brought to a nearby police station, where it went off, killing 11. The previously arrested anarchists, despite being imprisoned during the time of the explosion, received extended sentences from the district attorney. Anarchists plotted their own retaliation.

== Events ==
The dynamite plot was eventually connected to Galleanisti, anarchist communists followers of Luigi Galleani associated with his newspaper Cronaca Sovversiva. Paco Carlucci, an assumed alias of Carlo Valdinoci, attracted Gabriella "Ella" Antolini Segata to Youngstown, Ohio, where they were intimate before he put her on a train from Steubenville, Ohio, to Chicago with a case of dynamite from January 17–18, 1918. The dynamite was possibly en route to Milwaukee. The Bureau of Investigation said that others were involved, from Antolini Segata's husband Augusto Segata, to Mario Rusca, who gave her the satchel, to Emilio Coda, a coal miner with access to dynamite. Others said to be involved included Luigi Bachetti, a Detroit anarchist who was fundraising for legal defense of the Milwaukee anarchists, and John Scussel, another Galleanist.

Antolini Segata looked innocent, at the age of 18, but a train porter suspicious of the black satchel foiled the plot. When caught, Antolini Segata gave the name "Linda José", that of a character from an anarchist play. Her commitment to this pseudonym for multiple weeks bought her accomplices time to scatter.

== Aftermath ==
Found guilty in federal court, in October 1918 Gabriella Segata Antolini was sentenced to 18 months in Missouri State Penitentiary by Judge Kenesaw Mountain Landis, where she met Emma Goldman and Kate Richards O'Hare.

For his role in unraveling the case, Bureau of Investigation Special Agent Rayme Weston Finch was chosen to lead the Lynn, Massachusetts, raid on the Galleanist Cronaca Sovversiva offices in 1918. He would later become the department's foremost anti-radical investigator and an enemy of Luigi Galleani. A letter uncovered from the 1918 raid of Cronaca Sovversiva found a September 1917 letter from Valdinoci that mentioned a pseudonymed anarchist, now believed to be Mario Buda, who would wait in Monterrey, Mexico, for preparations before planting a bomb, potentially in reference to the Youngstown dynamite plot.

== Bibliography ==
- Avrich, Paul (1996). Sacco and Vanzetti: The Anarchist Background. Princeton University Press. ISBN 978-0-691-02604-6.
- Gordon, Michael A. (2009). "'To Make a Clean Sweep': Milwaukee Confronts an Anarchist Scare in 1917". The Wisconsin Magazine of History. 93 (2): 16–27.
- McCormick, Charles H. (2005). Hopeless Cases: The Hunt for the Red Scare Terrorist Bombers. Lanham, Maryland: University Press of America. ISBN 978-0-7618-3132-7. OCLC 60358652.
- Simon, Jeffrey D. (2022). America's Forgotten Terrorists: The Rise and Fall of the Galleanists. Lincoln: Potomac Books. ISBN 978-1-64012-404-2.
