= Mario Buda =

Italian anarchist and American Galleanist (1884–1963)

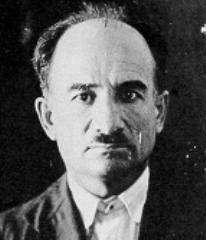
- Born: October 13, 1883; Savignano sul Rubicone, Italy
- Died: June 1, 1963 (aged 79); Savignano sul Rubicone, Italy
- Known for: Participation among Galleanists and involvement in multiple United States bombings

Mario Buda (October 13, 1883 – June 1, 1963) was an Italian anarchist who was active among the militant American Galleanists in the late 1910s and best known for being the likely perpetrator of the 1920 Wall Street bombing, which killed 40 people and injured hundreds. Historians implicate Buda in multiple bombings, though the documentary evidence is insufficient to prove his responsibility.

He emigrated from Italy's Romagna region, a cultural connection that would recur throughout his life. After working itinerant jobs across the United States and a short return to Romagna, Buda settled in Boston's Roxbury neighborhood, where he ran a cleaning company and grew close to Italian anarchists and disciples of Luigi Galleani. The Galleanists Sacco and Vanzetti were among his best friends. Buda traveled with a Galleanist group to Mexico for several months in 1917 to prepare for European revolution that never arrived. With waning morale and news of Galleani's deportation, Buda and the Galleanists began to plan a series of retaliatory bombings. Buda was likely involved with if not responsible for a 1917 Milwaukee police station bomb, a 1918 dynamite plot, and a 1919 mail bomb campaign.

Buda's car was the link in the Boston robbery investigation that led to the arrest of Sacco and Vanzetti, a landmark American trial. Buda was never caught. Incensed by the prison sentence and charges against his friends, Buda is believed to have bombed Wall Street in retaliation. The federal investigation, now cold, did not name Buda in its files. Within weeks of the bombing, Buda left for his hometown, never to return to the United States. He continued his anarchist activism in Italy. During the 1930s, however, he became a collaborator of the Italian Fascist secret police OVRA and was involved in foiling an anarchist plot against Benito Mussolini, for which Buda's name was scrubbed from the state list of radical subversives. He returned to anarchist activism after World War II and continued to deny his involvement in the American bombings.

== Early life and careers ==
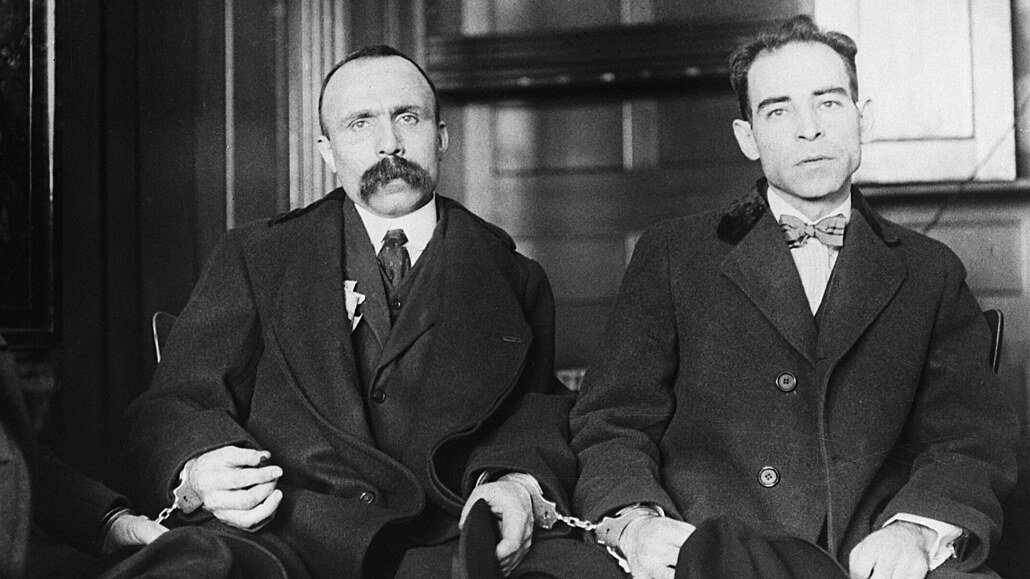
Sacco and Vanzetti were two of Buda's best friends

Mario Buda was born October 13, 1883, to Federico and Clarice Bertozzi in Savignano sul Rubicone, Italy. His father was either a footwear merchant or a gardener. He had minimal formal schooling. Born into "the heroic period" of Italian anarchism and industrial violence, Buda developed an early interest in anarchism as a teenager. He was sentenced to ten months of prison for theft as a teenager. Buda emigrated to the United States in 1907. In one of his first American experiences, his pocketbook was stolen. Buda worked itinerant jobs in the Boston area, for example, in construction, building, and gardening. In search of higher wages, Buda went west to Colorado but could only find work upon returning east to Washington, Illinois, and Wisconsin. Between 1911 and 1913, he revisited his Italian hometown to work with his father before returning to the United States for four years.

He settled in Boston's Roxbury neighborhood, a home to Romagna Italians like himself and Galleanists, acolytes of anarchist Luigi Galleani. Buda commuted to a Framingham hat factory and used his earnings to bring his younger brother Carlo to Boston. They worked for a cleaning company together and later opened their own in Wellesley, serving the women's college. Outside of work, Buda was an intransigent anarchist active among the Galleanists and a proponent of direct action. He worked on an anarchist Ferrer School with Roxbury's Circolo Educativo Mazziniano. Buda attended strikes, demonstrations, social picnics, and performances. He came to meet Sacco and Vanzetti at separate 1913 and 1916 strikes. Buda was arrested following a Boston antiwar demonstration in September 1916. His five-month sentence was reversed on appeal.

Buda traveled to Mexico in 1917 to prepare for an anticipated European revolution with other militants, such as Sacco and Vanzetti. They lived communally near Monterrey and the Sierra Madre Oriental. Though the Galleanists bonded in Mexico, morale sunk within months as their savings ran low and the revolution failed to materialize. While most could not find work, Buda opened a dry cleaning shop within a dentist's office. As they slowly dispersed back to the United States, additional news of Galleani's arrest and Italian anarchists killed in Milwaukee drove them to retaliate. Upon their return, the hardened Galleanists would carry out a series of retaliatory bombings. In letters, Buda expressed his readiness to fight political repression and "plant the poof".

== Bombings ==
In September 1917, a pastor held a patriotism rally near a local Galleanist meeting spot in Milwaukee's Bay View neighborhood. When the anarchists disrupted the rally, police fired on the demonstrators, killing two, arresting 11, and leading to a raid on the Galleanists. Incensed by this Bay View incident, Buda traveled to Chicago, the center of Midwest Italian anarchism, where he made plans to retaliate and worked for several months. In November 1917, a retaliatory bomb was left in the Milwaukee pastor's church and transported for inspection to the city's police station, where it exploded, killing 10. Though the bombmaker was never identified, historian of anarchism Paul Avrich wrote that Buda was most likely responsible for the attack with assistance from his comrade Carlo Valdinoci, who had been living in Youngstown.

Operating under the pseudonym "Mario Rusca", Buda was likely also involved in the Youngstown plot to supply Ella Antolini with a suitcase of dynamite in January 1918 to deliver from Ohio to Milwaukee for use in further attacks. The plot was uncovered and foiled before the train arrived in Chicago. As the police arrested others in affiliation with the plot, Buda left town and was never questioned in relation to the case. He retreated to Iron River, Michigan, where he worked under the assumed name "Mike Boda" both on the railroad and in selling bootleg whiskey. Historian Ann Larabee suggested that this iron-mining district might have taught Buda how to use dynamite. The Youngstown plot renewed federal interest in the Galleanist newspaper Cronaca Sovversiva. The Bureau of Investigation confiscated correspondence with Buda in a February 1918 raid of the newspaper's offices near Boston. Buda was not caught in 1918 deportations, having been off the Cronaca Sovversiva mailing list. He returned to Boston by early 1919.

Buda's small Galleanist circle was likely responsible for a campaign of package bombs in 1919, though the evidence is inconclusive. Under such an arrangement, Buda and Valdinoci would have been the bombmakers for targets decided by others. The pair participated in East Boston's Gruppo Autonomo, about 40 or 50 members from the area, many of whom were involved in the scheme. Buda also helped prepare Galleanist propaganda. A circular likely attributable to Buda, among others, challenged authorities' threats of deportation following the Immigration Act of 1918 and Galleani's own detention.

The case of Sacco and Vanzetti, being two of Buda's best friends, also tied Buda in its story. The prosecution believed Buda to be the gangleader behind two robberies in Bridgewater and South Braintree. The police met Buda in late April 1920 when investigating Ferruccio Coacci, an Italian anarchist who had been eager to hasten his deportation. He had been sharing Buda's rented West Bridgewater house. The police falsely identified themselves as immigration inspectors and Buda, who falsely identified himself as "Mike Boda", an Italian food salesman, willingly let them see the house. Buda was, in actuality, a whiskey bootlegger. After hearing that Buda's car was in a local garage for repair, the Bridgewater police chief suspected that it had been used in the South Braintree crime. Buda eluded their next visit and moved out before they returned again. The police asked the garage with Buda's car to notify them when someone came to retrieve it.

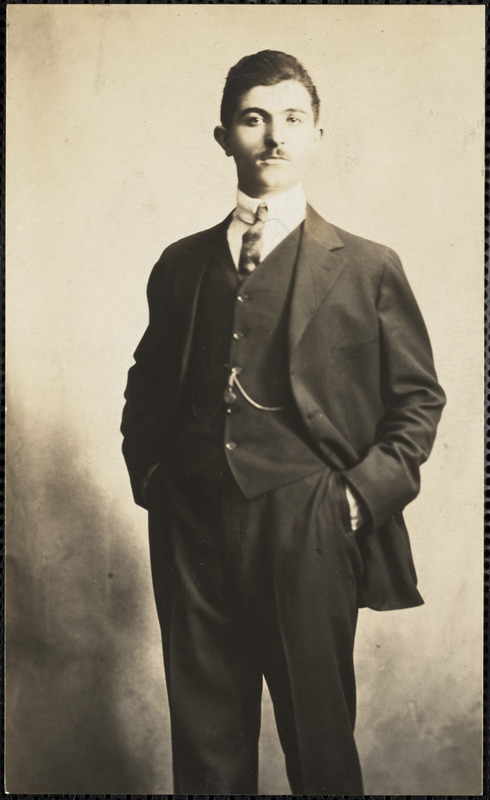
Ricardo Orciani

By early May, escalating fears from the federal investigation of Italian anarchists in New York City and the possibility of raids from the Department of Justice led the Boston Galleanists to need Buda's car to dispense of propaganda or explosives that would lead to their deportation. Buda traveled to the garage with Ricardo Orciani by motorcycle, meeting Sacco and Vanzetti there. The garage owner convinced Buda not to pick up the car until his license plates were updated, returning the Galleanists whence they came. About an hour later, Brockton police arrested Sacco and Vanzetti, who had not been suspects in the robberies. Fearing deportation and knowing neither their rights nor the crime of which they were being accused, Sacco and Vanzetti proceeded to lie about their politics and knowledge of Buda, leading the prosecution to build a case around the suspects' apparent "conscience of guilt".

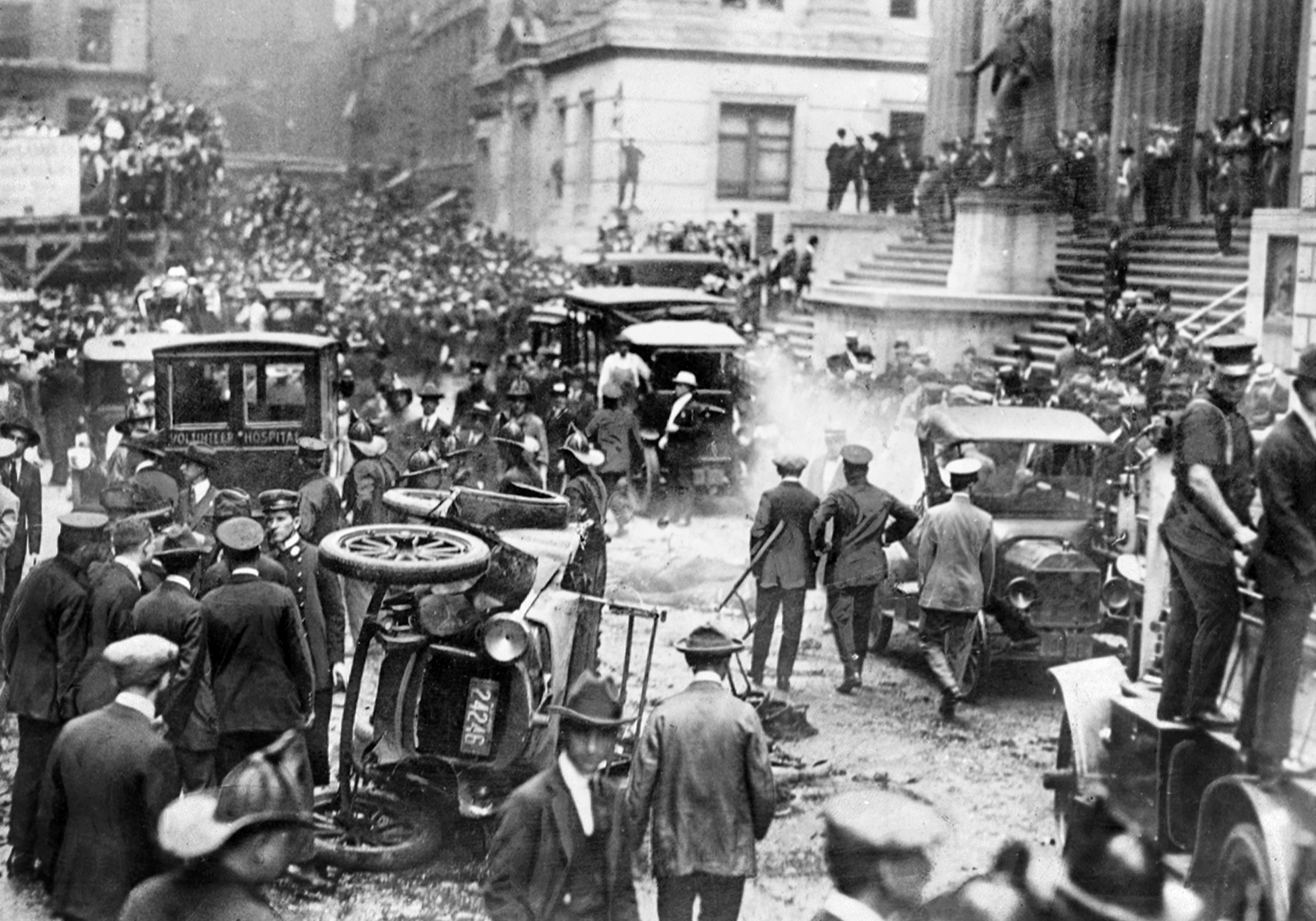
The Wall Street bombing is among the deadliest criminal acts in American history

Buda hid with an Italian family in Boston for three months. In July, Buda joined a colony of Romagnoli in Portsmouth, New Hampshire. He continued to elude police detection and follow the case's news from afar. Buda was incensed at the persecution of his close friends between the maximum, 12-to-15-year sentences levied on Sacco and Vanzetti for the Bridgewater robbery (in which there had been no injuries or goods stolen) and new September indictments against them for the South Braintree murders. Buda prepared his next retaliatory steps in Boston and traveled to New York, where he loaded a horse-drawn wagon with a timed dynamite bomb filled with cast iron slugs. He parked the wagon at the corner of Wall Street and Broad Street, the symbolic heart of American capitalism.

On September 16, 1920, at 12:01 p.m., Buda's wagon bomb exploded on Wall Street, killing 40 and wounding over 200. Its victims were clerks, stenographers, and runners about the crowded streets, not leaders of finance. Though the inside of the House of Morgan was destroyed, J. P. Morgan himself, a recipient of one of the 1919 package bombs, was in England and his deputies were insulated indoors. The bomb's flames reached 12 stories high and its ensuing blaze caused over $2 million in property damage (equivalent to $32.1 million in 2025). The federal investigation soon attributed the bombing to the Galleanists behind the 1919 package bombings as revenge for Sacco and Vanzetti's prosecution. A blacksmith identified the bomber as a Sicilian and police circulated a composite photograph nationwide. After a wide sweep of the eastern seaboard in which hundreds were questioned and a $100,000 reward offered, the investigation ended unsuccessfully with the bomber unidentified. Buda is not named in the federal investigation files. Despite Buda matching the profile, documentary evidence does not sufficiently prove him to be the Wall Street bomber.

== Return to Italy ==
Some time after the Wall Street bombing, Buda returned to Providence, Rhode Island, where he acquired a passport from the Italian consulate. Within weeks, he left for Naples on a French ship and was in Romagna by November. He was excited to arrive in Italy's biennio rosso, a two-year period of radical labor and unrest near its end in late 1920. He started an anarchist group, organized lectures and leaflets, and spoke in praise of Sacco and Vanzetti. When approached to testify on their behalf, however, he declined, believing that would put his life in jeopardy. Buda rekindled contact with friends domestic and abroad, including Galleani, who had been deported some months prior. The Italian police surveilled the returning anarchists, whose suppression worsened upon Mussolini's rise to power in the 1920s. Buda began a shoe company, which he continued to run alone when his partner and other comrades left Italy. Buda continued to distribute clandestine anarchist propaganda.

He was charged with killing the Savignano Carabinieri commander in March 1921, following a demonstration, but was acquitted for lack of evidence. The police believed he manipulated evidence, and in November 1927, Buda was sent to serve five years on Lipari, an island colony for political prisoners off the coast of Sicily. There he was found singing radical songs with other anarchists and was sent to prison for three months. When the American Edward Holton James interviewed Buda in 1928 about the South Braintree payroll robbery and murders, Buda maintained his innocence. He said he never saw or had any involvement with bombs. Buda was later transferred to Ponza island in mid-1929 and released to Savignano in November 1932.

Buda became an informant for the OVRA, the Italian Fascist secret police, infiltrating their political opponents. In a test of his abilities, he received a passport to France in March 1933. He stayed for four months and stopped in Geneva en route. Later that year, a Parisian Communist publication accused Buda of being an agent provocateur based on suspicious proposals he made at an anarchist meeting and claims he had made in Cesena of being an Italian Communist Party official. The Italian Communist Party also accused Buda of being a mole. The practice of recruiting and turning anti-fascist paramilitaries was confirmed by 1935. Between 1937 and 1939, Buda helped foil a plot against Italian dictator Benito Mussolini by the Trieste anarchist Umberto Tommasini, whom he likely met in Ponza. He reported on a meeting with Tommasini, signing his name "Romagna". In exchange, the Polizia di Stato delisted Buda as a radical subversive.

Following World War II, Buda returned to anarchist activism in Savignano. He died in Savignano's hospital on June 1, 1963. When asked later in his life about his final weeks in America, Buda maintained his innocence and said he never saw or had any involvement with bombs. He told his friend's son that after eluding the police's house visit, he went to Chicago before sailing to Italy.

== Personal life ==
Buda was small in stature and had the nickname "Nasone" for his big nose. Historian Paul Avrich wrote that Buda was known to be calm, with a thoughtful manner and stubborn pride and, like the other Galleanisti in Mexico from Italian peasantry, intensely tenacious, loyal, with a tough conviction.

== Bibliography ==
- Avrich, Paul (1996). Sacco and Vanzetti: The Anarchist Background. Princeton University Press. ISBN 978-0-691-02604-6.
- Febo, Lucio (2004). "BUDA, Mario". Dizionario biografico online degli anarchici italiani (in Italian). Archived from the original on September 8, 2021.
- McCormick, Charles H. (2005). Hopeless Cases: The Hunt for the Red Scare Terrorist Bombers. Lanham, Maryland: University Press of America. ISBN 978-0-7618-3132-7. OCLC 60358652.
- Tejada, Susan (2012). In Search of Sacco and Vanzetti: Double Lives, Troubled Times, and the Massachusetts Murder Case That Shook the World. Northeastern University Press. ISBN 978-1-55553-730-2.
