= Bay View incident =

1917 violence between Milwaukee police and anarchists

Coordinates: 43°02′05″N 87°54′16″W

- Date: September 9, 1917
- Location: Bay View, Milwaukee, Wisconsin

Parties
Italian-American anarchists	Milwaukee Police Department

Casualties and losses
2 dead	2 wounded

Casualties
- Arrested: 11

On September 9, 1917, members of the Milwaukee Police Department clashed with Italian anarchists in the Bay View neighborhood of Milwaukee, Wisconsin. A group of Italian anarchists gathered to disrupt a rally held by Augusto Giuliani, the pastor of a local Methodist church. A conflict erupted during the rally and gunfire was exchanged between police and anarchists. Two anarchists were killed and two policemen wounded. Eleven local Italians were later arrested and charged with attempted murder.

Two months later, a bomb was found outside of Giuliani's church, allegedly planted by Galleanists as retaliation for the incident at the rally. It was taken to the local police station by one of Giuliani's parishioners where it detonated, killing nine policemen and one bystander. No one was convicted for the bombing, but the incident precipitated a larger campaign of Galleanist attacks across the United States. The November trial of the eleven Bay View anarchists arrested for September's shooting incident was influenced by sentiment related to the bombing.

== Incident ==
On Sunday, September 9, 1917, the Methodist minister of the Milwaukee Italian Evangelical Church, Augusto Giuliani, held a rally in support of America's war effort. The rally was held in Bay View, a largely Italian neighborhood, near the Galleanists' Francisco Ferrer Circle clubhouse. Giuliani was a controversial figure in the local Italian community. He was a former Catholic priest from Rome who had converted to Protestantism. In Italy, he had baptized the son of Guglielmo Marconi before he had married an American missionary and joined her evangelization efforts in Bay View. Giuliani's missionary endeavors were opposed by both the largely Catholic Italian population in the neighborhood as well as the anarchists due to Giuliani's efforts to instill patriotism and support for the war among immigrants. This was the third rally held by Giuliani in the area. Policemen were present at the request of Giuliani after two previous meetings held by Giuliani were disrupted by anarchists.

As Giuliani finished his speech and the crowd sang "America", the Ferrer Circle's Galleanist anarchists mounted the platform and tore down the American flag. Police fired on the demonstrators. The Circle's theater group director Antonio Fornasier was shot through his heart and died immediately. Augusto Marinelli fired back with a pistol and was shot in the chest, hospitalized, and died from his wounds five days later. Bartolo Testalin was shot in the back and survived. Two detectives had non-serious wounds.

The police arrested eleven anarchists. They described Mary Nardini as the riot's instigator. The police raided the Circle's clubhouse, confiscated anarchist publications, and roughed up Circle members.

== Retaliation ==
In Mexico, the Bay View incident spurred exiled Galleanists to retaliate. They had been planning their reprisal for the arrest of their mentor, the Italian–American insurrectionary anarchist Luigi Galleani, since his arrest in June 1917. After the September incident, three members of the group traveled to Chicago and Youngstown, Ohio.

On the evening of November 24, someone planted an iron pipe bomb in the basement of Giuliani's Italian Evangelical Church. It was discovered by the young daughter of the church's scrubwoman. It was moved to the police headquarters for inspection where, while handled and joked about by detectives, it went off. The explosion killed ten detectives, including one who had been wounded at the September rally, and a bystander who had come to report a robbery.

The bombmaker was never identified. Historian of anarchism Paul Avrich wrote that it might have been local Ferrer Circle anarchists, but it was more likely to have been two of the Galleanists from Mexico, Mario Buda with the assistance of Carlo Valdinoci, coming from Chicago and Youngstown, respectively. The Chicago Police Chief responsible for arresting the Haymarket anarchists sent two detectives who spoke Italian, to no avail. The police and public were outraged.

== Trial ==
The eleven anarchists involved in the Bay View incident were put on trial in late November. Though the anarchists were being tried for assault with intent to murder two detectives, observers believed that they were really on trial for the police station explosion. While only one or two of the accused had participated in the shooting, eleven were on trial. Testalin, for one, asked who he was accused of attempting to kill, having been shot in the back at the rally and detained since. The prosecution sought to prove conspiracy, similar to the Haymarket trial, that even if the defendants did not participate in the shooting, they were involved in the plan. The attorney cited the Circle's seized anarchist literature as evidence of their conspiratorial intentions.

The trial's jury returned in just 17 minutes with a guilty verdict despite what historian Paul Avrich described as insubstantial evidence. The verdict was later appealed and overturned. Most of the defendants were released and deported.

== Impact ==
The Bay View incident was the opening salvo in a series of attacks between police and the Galleanists across the United States.

The police station bombing, while not intended for the police, was, according to the FBI Criminal Justice Information Services Division, the country's "worst police tragedy" prior to the September 11 attacks. No one was convicted for the bombing.

== Bibliography ==
- "10 KILLED BY BOMB IN MILWAUKEE POLICE STATION". New York Times. November 25, 1917.
- Avrich, Paul (1996). Sacco and Vanzetti: The Anarchist Background. Princeton University Press. ISBN 978-0-691-02604-6.
- Kirkpatrick, Michael D. (Winter 2001). "A Final Word". The CJIS Link. 5 (4): 6–7. OCLC 45193748.
