= Milwaukee Police Department bombing =

1917 anarchist terror attack in Wisconsin

Coordinates: 43°02′27.0″N 87°54′30.5″W

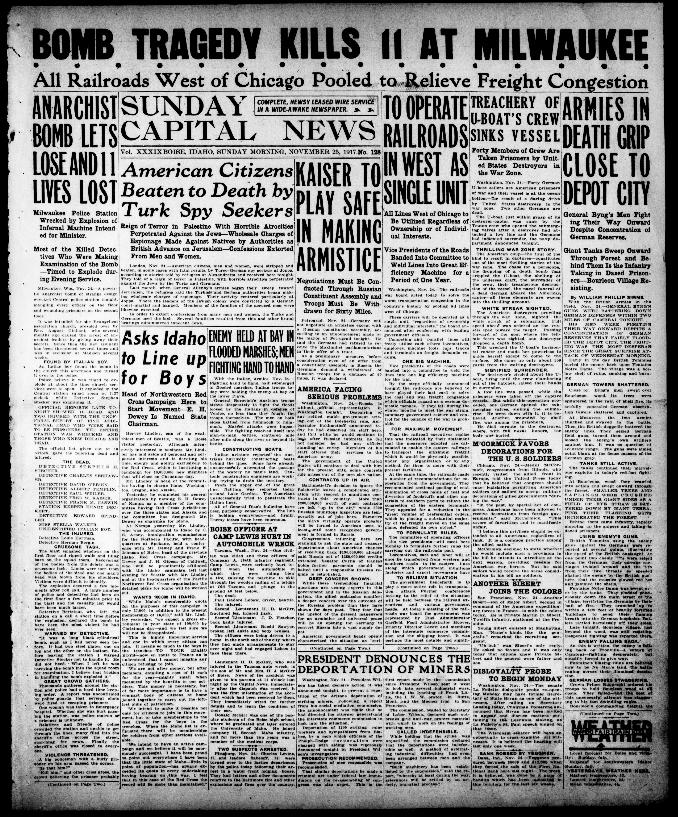
- Boise's Evening Capital News headline reads Bomb tragedy kills 11 at Milwaukee
- Location: Central police station at Oneida and Broadway, Milwaukee, Wisconsin, U.S.
- Date: November 24, 1917; 7:33 P.M. (local time)
- Target: Milwaukee Italian Evangelical Church
- Attack type: Large black powder bomb, mass murder
- Deaths: 10 (9 officers, 1 civilian)
- Injuries: 6
- Perpetrator: Galleanists (unconfirmed)
- Motive: Anarchism, retaliation for Bay View incident

The Milwaukee Police Department bombing was a November 24, 1917, bomb attack that killed nine members of local law enforcement and a civilian in Milwaukee, Wisconsin. The perpetrators were never caught but are suspected to be an anarchist terrorist cell operating in the United States in the early 20th century. The target was initially an evangelical church in the Third Ward and only killed the police officers when the bomb was taken to the police station by a concerned civilian. The bombing remained the most fatal single event in national law enforcement history for over 80 years until the September 11 attacks.

== Background ==
On September 9, 1917, Rev. Augusto Giuliani of the Milwaukee Italian Evangelical Church held a rally near a local Galleanist meeting spot in Milwaukee's Bay View neighborhood. When the anarchists disrupted the rally, police fired on the demonstrators, killing two, arresting 11, and leading to a raid on the Galleanists.

== The bombing ==
A little over two months later, on November 24, 1917, a large black powder bomb wrapped as a package was discovered by Maude L. Richter, a social worker, next to Rev. Giuliani's church in the Third Ward. She dragged the package into the church basement and notified the church janitor, Sam Mazzone. Mazzone took the bomb to the central police station at Oneida and Broadway and turned it over to the Milwaukee Police Department. The station keeper was showing it to the shift commander, Lieutenant Robert Flood, right before a scheduled inspection, when it exploded. Nine members of the department were killed in the blast, along with a female civilian who had been there to report a robbery. Six additional police personnel were seriously injured: a lieutenant and five detectives. The police detective who faced the full brunt of the explosion was reported to have been found with his body mangled while one officer was killed while on the second floor. The explosion was loud enough to be heard throughout much of the city and attracted a crowd of thousands to the police station.

== Casualties ==
Nine members of the Milwaukee Police Department were killed as well as Catherine Walker, who was in the police station reporting a robbery.

Name	Appointed	Years on the force
Henry Deckert	October 21, 1913	4
Frank Caswin	February 1, 1915	2
Frederick Kaiser	February 7, 1905	12
David O'Brien	November 4, 1897	20
Stephen Stecker	December 1, 1899	17
Charles Seehawer	December 1, 1899	17
Edward Spindler	July 1, 1903	14
Al Templin	October 17, 1904	13
Paul Weiler	December 13, 1906	10

== Aftermath ==
It was suspected at the time that the bomb had been placed outside the church by the Galleanist anarchists who had been involved in the Bay View incident. Those responsible were never apprehended, but days later the eleven alleged Italian anarchists previously arrested went to trial on charges stemming from the Bay View incident. The specter of the larger, uncharged crime of the bombing haunted the proceedings and assured convictions of all eleven. However, in 1918, Clarence Darrow led an appeal that gained freedom for most of the convicted.

While historian of anarchism Paul Avrich has suggested the local Ferrer Circle anarchists may have been responsible, interviews with surviving Galleanist members implicated Mario Buda, chief bombmaker for the Galleanists, and Carlo Valdinoci. Buda and Valdinocci had previously fled with many other Galleanists to Mexico in order to evade the draft. At the time, the bombing was the most fatal single event in national law enforcement history, only surpassed later by the September 11 attacks.

== See also ==
- List of unsolved murders (1900–1979)
- 16th Street Baptist Church bombing
- Anarchism and violence
- Propaganda of the deed
- September 1920 Wall Street bombing
- Palmer Raids
- Espionage Act of 1917
- 1919 United States anarchist bombings

== Bibliography ==
Notes

References

- "10 KILLED BY BOMB IN MILWAUKEE POLICE STATION". New York Times. November 25, 1917.
- Avrich, Paul (1996). Sacco and Vanzetti: The Anarchist Background. Princeton University Press. ISBN 9780691026046. - Total pages: 265
- Avrich, Paul (1996b). Anarchist Voices: An Oral History of Anarchism in America. Princeton University Press. ISBN 9780691044941. - Total pages: 323
- Balousek, Marv & Editor J. Allen Kirsch (1997). 50 Wisconsin Crimes of the Century. Badger Books Inc. ISBN 9781878569479. - Total pages: 365
- Dell’Arti, Giorgio (January 26, 2002). "La Storia di Mario Buda" (PDF). memoteca.it. Archived from the original (PDF) on October 27, 2007.
- The Indianapolis Star (November 26, 1917). "Bomb Mystery Baffles Police". The Indianapolis Star. John Shaffer. OCLC 760301417.
- Miller, Ryan W. (July 17, 2016). "Deadliest attacks on police in the last 100 years". USA Today.
- Government of Milwaukee (2017). "Milwaukee Police Department Officer Memorial Page". Government of Milwaukee. Archived from the original on October 13, 2007.
- Strang, Dean A. (2013). Worse Than the Devil: Anarchists, Clarence Darrow, and Justice in a Time of Terror. University of Wisconsin Press. ISBN 9780299293932. - Total pages: 268
- Watson, Bruce (2007). Sacco and Vanzetti: The Men, the Murders, and the Judgment of Mankind. Penguin Books. ISBN 9781101202623. - Total pages: 448
