= Albert F. Hayden =

American judge

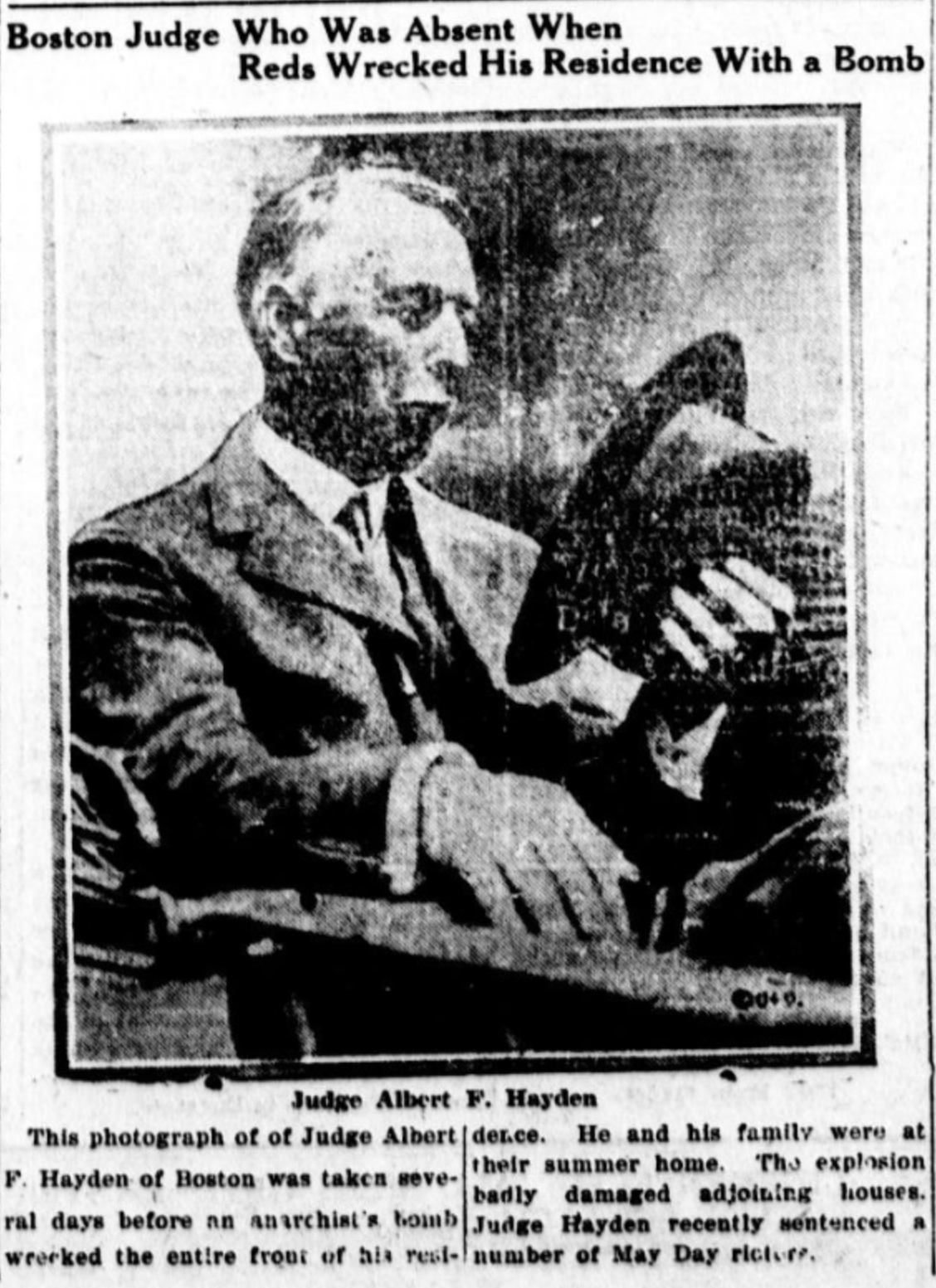
- Photo of Albert F Hayden in The Evening Herald, June 13, 1919

Roxbury Municipal Court Judge

Personal details
- Born: Albert F. Hayden; May 5, 1865 Plymouth, Massachusetts, U.S.
- Died: April 21, 1962 (aged 96) Plymouth, Massachusetts, U.S.
- Children: Malcolm Hayden
- Education: read law

Albert Fearing Hayden (May 5, 1865 – April 21, 1962) was an American judge who presided over the sentencing of people arrested during the May Day riots of 1919. This made him a target during the 1919 United States anarchist bombings when his house was bombed.

== May Day riots of 1919 ==
The May Day riots of 1919 were a series of violent demonstrations that occurred throughout Cleveland, Ohio, on May 1 (May Day), 1919. The riots occurred during the May Day parade organized by Socialist leader Charles Ruthenberg, of local trade unionists, socialists, communists, and anarchists to protest against the conviction of Eugene V. Debs.

One of those arrested during the riots was William James Sidis. Sidis had graduated from Harvard University at the age of 15. Judge Albert F. Hayden in the Roxbury Municipal Court presided over his case. During the testimony Sidis was quoted as saying that he was a Socialist, a believer in the Soviet form of government, that he believed in evolution, that he did not believe in a god, that his god was evolution, and that he believed in the American form of government to the extent of the Declaration of Independence. Sidis and 11 other persons who were arrested during the May Day riots in Roxbury were given jail sentences, the so-called Harvard prodigy getting a year and a half.

During sentencing Hayden raged against the perceived foreign threat behind the riots, "foreigners who think they can get away with their doctrines in this country … if I could have my way I would send them and their families back to the country from which they came."

== 1919 United States anarchist bombings ==
The 1919 United States anarchist bombings were a series of bombings and attempted bombings carried out by the Italian anarchist followers of Luigi Galleani from April through June 1919. There were two bomb targets in Boston: one was Massachusetts State Representative Leland Powers, and the other was Boston Judge Albert F. Hayden. The Hayden family was on vacation at the time, and only the judge's son, Malcolm Hayden, was in town. The bomb, which exploded just before midnight on June 2, 1919, nearly destroyed the home. The son, while walking home, saw a car speed away and then the explosion.

== Death ==
Hayden died on April 21, 1962, at Jordan Hospital in Plymouth, Massachusetts.

== Bibliography ==
Notes

References

- McCann, Joseph T. (2006). Terrorism on American Soil: A Concise History of Plots and Perpetrators from the Famous to the Forgotten. Sentient Publications. ISBN 9781591810490. - Total pages: 336
- Puleo, Stephen (2019). Dark Tide: The Great Boston Molasses Flood of 1919. Beacon Press. ISBN 9780807078013. - Total pages: 288
- The Washington Times (May 16, 1919). "Harvard Prodigy Held As Rioter". The Washington Times. ISSN 0732-8494. OCLC 8472624.
