= 1919 United States anarchist bombings =

Series of bombings in the US in 1919

- Part of the First Red Scare
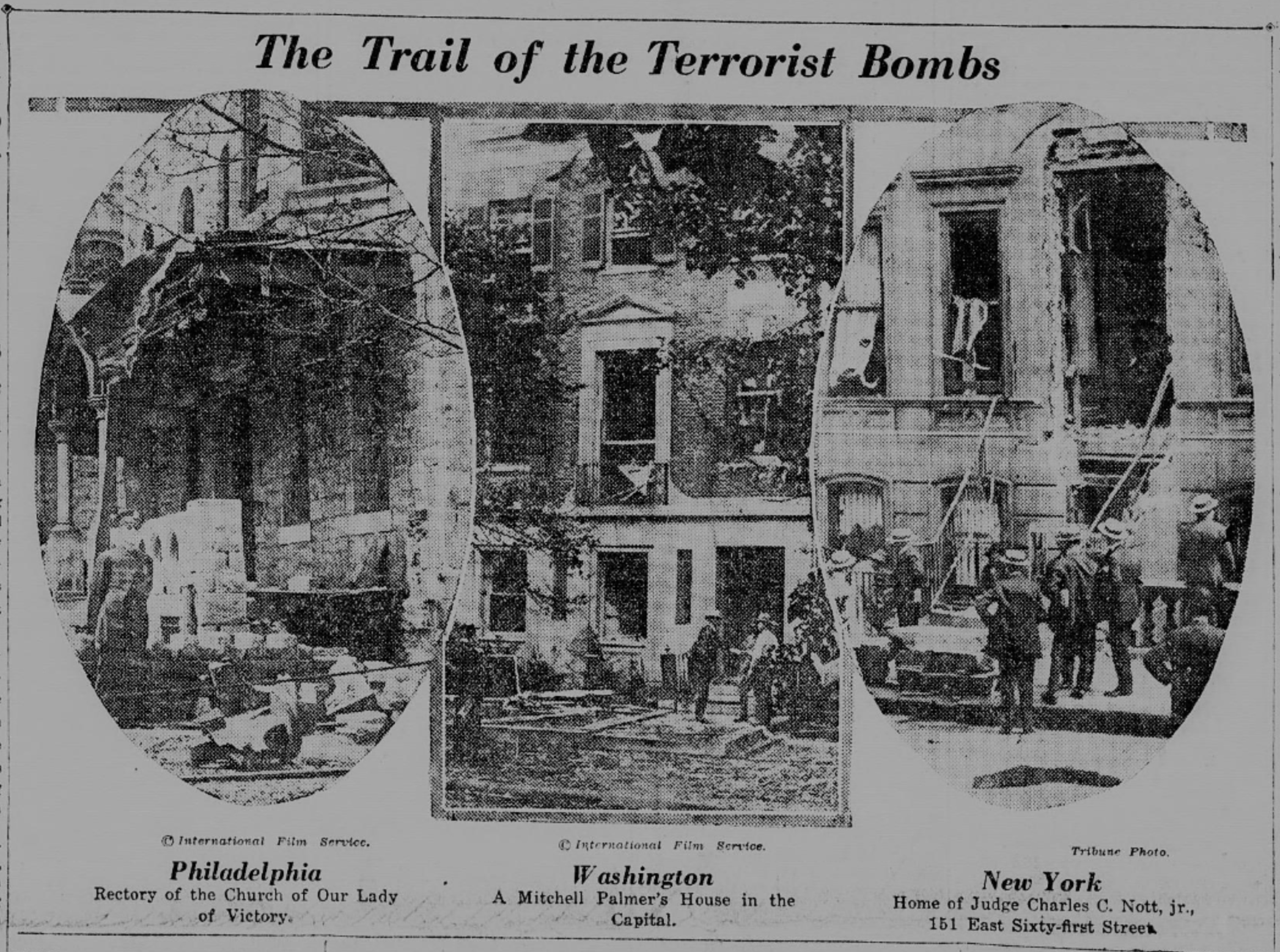
- The New-York Tribune's coverage of the bombings, June 4, 1919
- Location: Throughout the United States
- Date: April–June 1919
- Attack type: Letter bombs
- Deaths: 2
- Injuries: 2
- Perpetrator: Galleanists

From April through June 1919, a series of bombings were carried out or attempted across the United States by Galleanists (followers of Luigi Galleani, an Italian immigrant who advocated insurrectionary anachism). The targets included anti-immigration politicians, anti-anarchist officials, and prominent businessmen, as well as a journalist and a church. Almost all of the bombs were sent by mail. The bombings were one of the major factors contributing to the First Red Scare. Two people were killed, including one of the bombers, and two injured.

== April mail bomb attacks ==
In late April 1919, at least 36 booby trap dynamite-filled bombs were mailed to a cross-section of prominent politicians and appointees, including the Attorney General as well as justice officials, newspaper editors and businessmen, including John D. Rockefeller. Among all the bombs addressed to high-level officials, one bomb was addressed to the home of a Department of Justice Bureau of Investigation (BOI) field agent once tasked with investigating the Galleanists, Rayme Weston Finch, who in 1918 had arrested two prominent Galleanists while leading a police raid on the offices of their publication Cronaca Sovversiva.

The mail bombs were wrapped in brown paper with similar address and advertising labels. Inside, wrapped in bright green paper and stamped "Gimbel Brothers-Novelty Samples", was a cardboard box with a 6 by 3 by 1 inch (150 by 80 by 30 mm) block of hollowed wood, packed with a stick of dynamite. A small vial of sulfuric acid was fastened to the wood block, along with three fulminate-of-mercury blasting caps. Opening one end of the box (the end marked "open") released a coil spring that caused the acid to drip from its vial onto the blasting caps; the acid ate through the caps, igniting them and detonating the dynamite.

The Galleanists intended their bombs to be delivered on May Day. Since 1890 and the Second International, May 1 had been celebrated as the international day of communist, anarchist and socialist revolutionary solidarity. Seattle Mayor Ole Hanson, who had recently attained national prominence for opposing a general strike in Seattle, received one of the mailed package bombs, but it was opened by William Langer, a member of his office staff. Langer opened the wrong end of the box and the bottle of acid dropped onto a table without detonation. He took the bomb to the local police, who notified the Post Service and other police agencies. On April 29, Georgia Senator Thomas W. Hardwick, who had co-sponsored the Alien Anarchists Exclusion Act of 1918, received a similarly disguised bomb. It blew off the hands of his housekeeper when she attempted to open the package. The senator's wife was also injured in the blast, which severely burned her face and neck and a piece of shrapnel cut her lip and loosened several of her teeth.

News reports of the Hardwick bomb described its distinctive packaging and an alert post office employee in New York connected this to 16 similar packages which he had set aside a few days earlier for insufficient postage. Another 12 bombs were eventually recovered before reaching their intended targets. The addressees were the following:

- Theodore G. Bilbo, Governor of Mississippi
- Frederick Bullmers, Daily News editor from Jackson, Mississippi
- Albert S. Burleson, Postmaster General
- John L. Burnett, Representative from Alabama
- Anthony Caminetti, Commissioner General of Immigration
- Edward A. Cunha, Assistant District Attorney of San Francisco
- Richard Enright, New York City Police Commissioner
- T. Larry Eyre, Pennsylvania State Senator
- Charles Fickert, District Attorney of San Francisco
- Rayme Weston Finch, field agent of the Bureau of Investigation
- Ole Hanson, Mayor of Seattle, Washington
- Thomas W. Hardwick, former Senator from Georgia
- Oliver Wendell Holmes Jr, Associate Justice of the Supreme Court
- Frederic C. Howe, Port of New York Commissioner of Immigration
- John Francis Hylan, Mayor of New York City
- Albert Johnson, Representative from Washington
- William H. King, Senator from Utah
- William H. Lamar, solicitor of the Post Office
- Kenesaw Mountain Landis, District Judge of Chicago
- J. P. Morgan Jr., businessman
- Frank Knowlton Nebeker, Special Assistant to the Attorney General
- Lee Slater Overman, Senator from North Carolina
- A. Mitchell Palmer, Attorney General
- John D. Rockefeller, businessman
- William I. Schaffer, Attorney General of Pennsylvania
- Walter A. Scott, Mayor of Jackson, Mississippi
- Reed Smoot, Senator from Utah
- William Cameron Sproul, Governor of Pennsylvania
- William Bauchop Wilson, Secretary of Labor
- William Madison Wood, president of the American Woolen Company

== June bombings ==
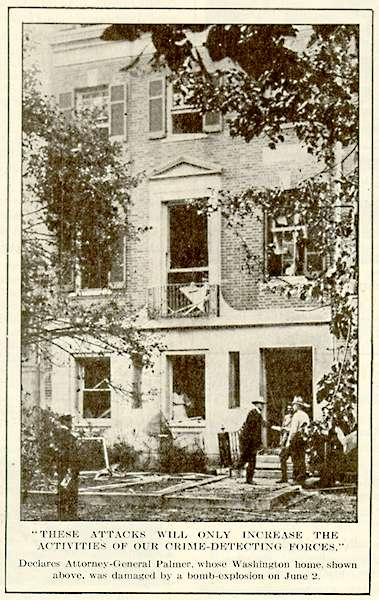
Damage done by the bomb at Attorney General A. Mitchell Palmer's house

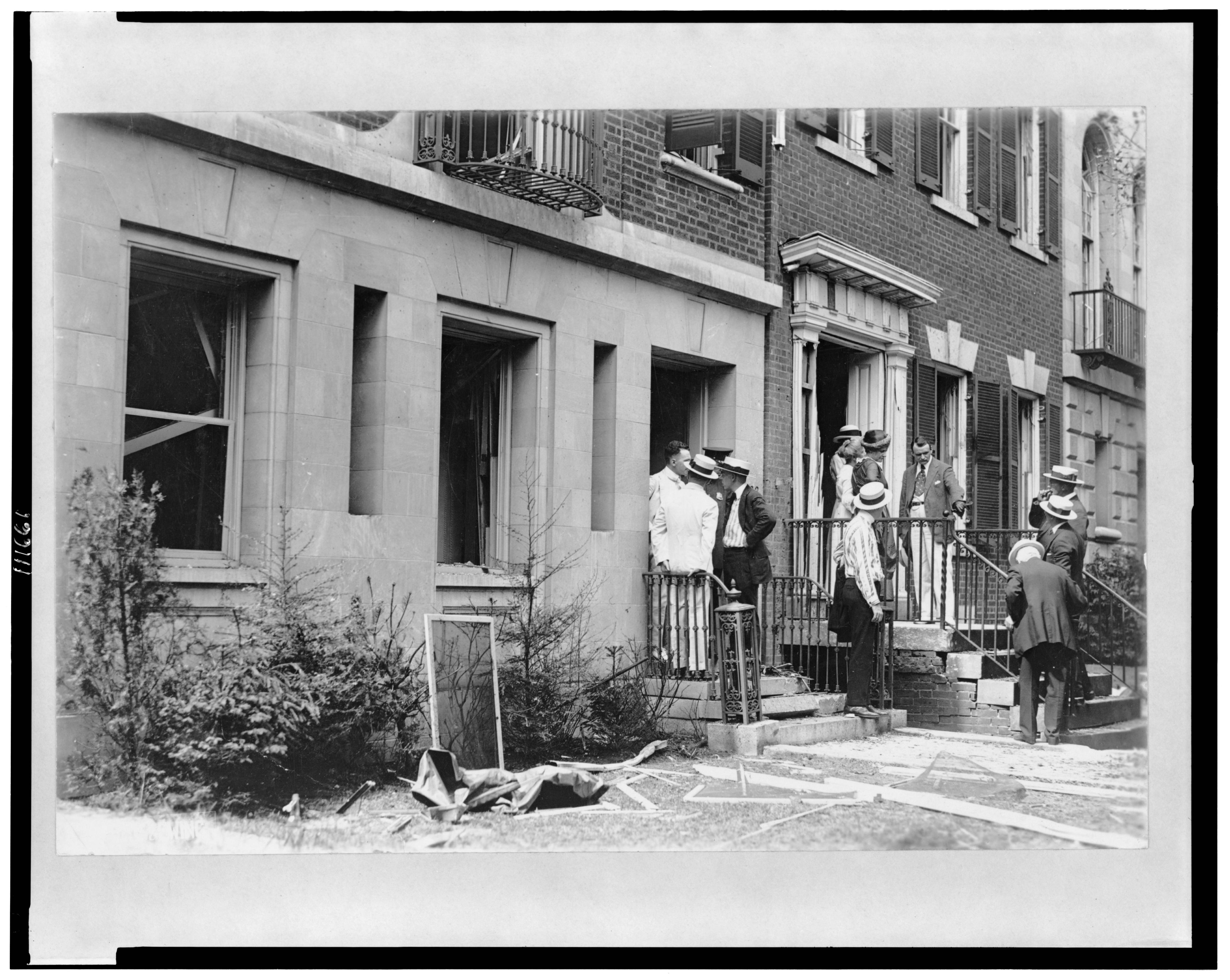
Mitchell Palmer house in Washington DC 2132 R Street NW after bomb attack June 2, 1919

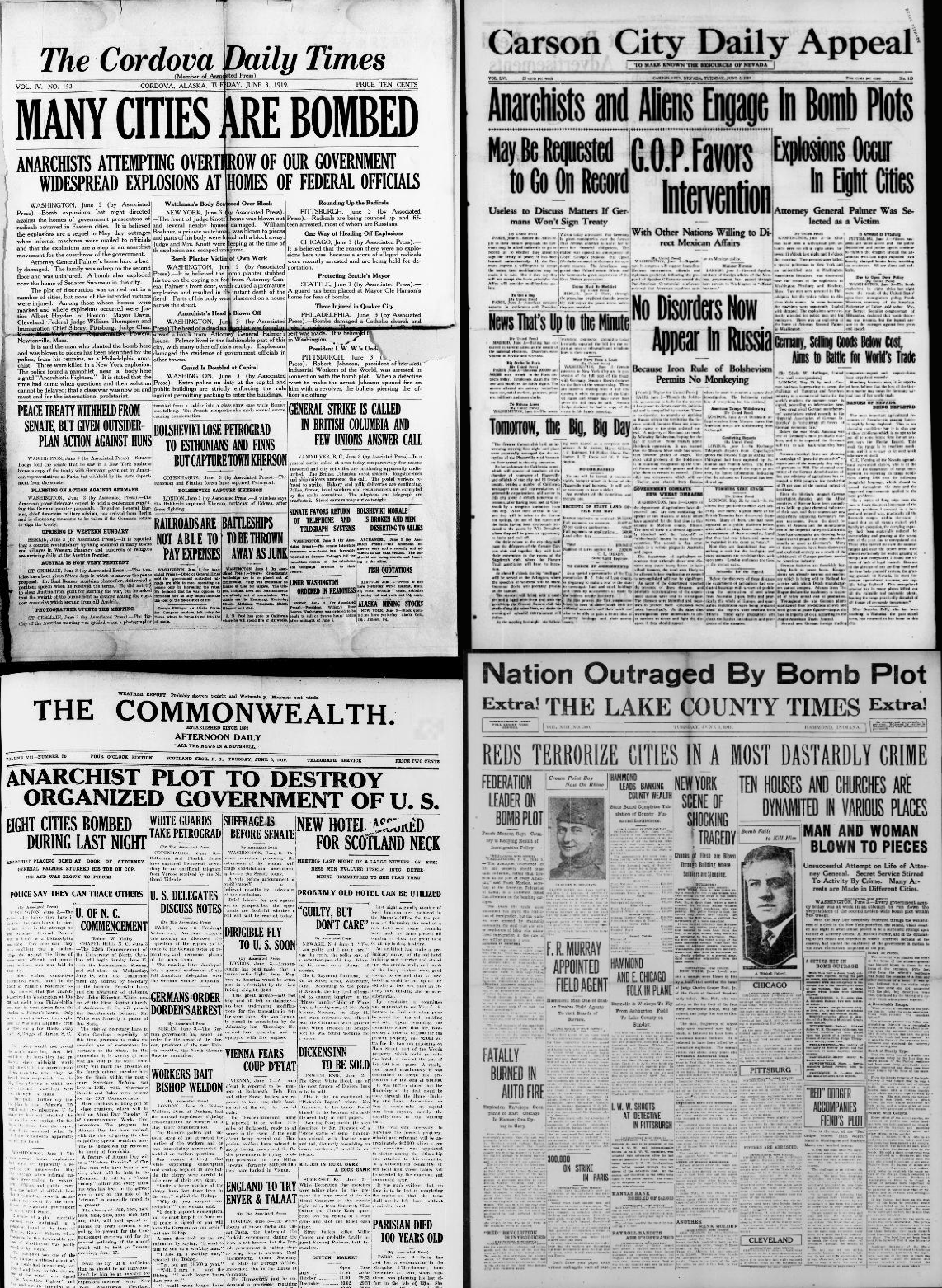
June 3, 1919, newspapers of the 1919 United States anarchist bombings

On the evening of June 2, 1919, the Galleanists managed to detonate nine large bombs nearly simultaneously in eight cities. These bombs were much larger than those sent in April, using up to 25 pounds (11 kg) of dynamite and all were wrapped or packaged with heavy metal slugs designed to act as shrapnel. Addressees included government officials who had endorsed anti-sedition laws and deportation of immigrants suspected of crimes or associated with illegal movements, as well as judges who had sentenced anarchists to prison.

The targets were:

- Roman Catholic Church: Our Lady of Victory (Philadelphia)
- Harry Klotz, a silk industrialist, whose factories were targets of the 1913 Paterson silk strike (335 East 31st Street) but the bomb damaged the house (331 East 31st Street) of Henry Morris (Paterson, New Jersey)
- Mayor of Cleveland Harry L. Davis (Cleveland)
- Boston Judge Albert F Hayden (Boston)
- Massachusetts State Representative Leland Powers (Newton, Massachusetts)
- Pittsburgh's Federal Judge W. H. Seward Thomson (Pittsburgh)
- Immigration Chief W. W. Sibray (Pittsburgh)
- Judge Charles C. Nott (New York)
- Attorney General A. Mitchell Palmer (Washington, D.C.)

Palmer, who had already been the recipient of a mail bomb in April, was again attacked in the new wave of violence. None of the targeted men were killed, but one bomb took the life of New York City night watchman William Boehner and the bomb intended for Attorney General Palmer's home prematurely exploded and killed the bomb-setter Carlo Valdinoci, who was a former editor of the Galleanist publication Cronaca Sovversiva and close associate of Galleani. Though not seriously injured, Palmer and his family were shaken by the blast and the house itself was largely demolished. Two near-casualties of the same bomb were Assistant Secretary of the Navy Franklin Delano Roosevelt and his wife Eleanor, then living across the street from Palmer. They had passed the house just minutes before the explosion and their residence was close enough that one of the bomber's body parts landed on their doorstep.

Each of the bombs was delivered with several copies of a pink flyer, titled "Plain Words", that read as such:

War, Class war, and you were the first to wage it under the cover of the powerful institutions you call order, in the darkness of your laws. There will have to be bloodshed; we will not dodge; there will have to be murder: we will kill, because it is necessary; there will have to be destruction; we will destroy to rid the world of your tyrannical institutions.

The flyer was later traced to a print shop operated by two anarchists, typesetter Andrea Salsedo and compositor Roberto Elia, who were both Galleanists according to the later memoirs of other members. Salsedo died under suspicious circumstances (either by suicide or defenestration depending on the source) was and Elia refused an offer to cancel deportation proceedings if he would testify about his role in the Galleanist organization. Unable to secure enough evidence for criminal trials, authorities continued to use the Anarchist Exclusion Act and related statutes to deport known Galleanists.

== Response ==
Fueled by labor unrest and the anarchist bombings, and then spurred on by Attorney General A. Mitchell Palmer's attempt to suppress radical and non-radical labor organizations, the response to the bombings was characterized by exaggerated rhetoric, illegal search and seizures, unwarranted arrests and detentions and the deportation of several hundred suspected radicals and anarchists. Palmer, twice targeted by anarchist bombs, organized the nationwide series of police actions known as the Palmer raids in November 1919 and January 1920. Under suspicion of violating the Espionage Act, the Sedition Act and/or the Immigration Act of 1918, approximately 10,000 people were arrested, of whom 3,500 were held in detention. Of those held in detention, 556 resident aliens were eventually deported.

== Media and popular culture ==
The bombings were dramatized in the 2012 film No God, No Master. The bombing of the home of Palmer was also dramatized in the 2011 film J. Edgar.

The June Bombings and the "Plain Words" fliers were referenced in the video game Arkham Origins by Anarky, one of the game's antagonists.

== See also ==
- Lexington Avenue explosion (1914)
- Preparedness Day Bombing (1916)
- Milwaukee Police Department bombing (1917)
- Palmer raids (1919–1920)
- Sacco and Vanzetti
- Wall Street bombing (1920)
- San Francisco Police Department Park Station bombing (1970)
- Greenwich Village townhouse explosion (1970)
- 2018 United States mail bombing attempts
- Anarchism and violence
- Propaganda of the deed
- Ted Kaczynski – Neo-Luddite called the Unabomber, involved in a series of similar postal bombings
- List of incidents of political violence in Washington, D.C.
