= Bay View riot =

The Bay View riot may refer to:

- The 1886 Bay View massacre, in which the Wisconsin National Guard killed during a labor strike
- The 1917 Bay View incident between anarchists and police in Milwaukee
