= No God, No Master =

2012 US crime suspense film by Terry Green

- Directed by: Terry Green
- Written by: Terry Green
- Produced by: Terry Green
- Starring: David Strathairn; Sam Witwer; Ray Wise; Edoardo Ballerini; Alessandro Mario
- Cinematography: Paul Sanchez
- Edited by: Suzy Elmiger A.C.E.
- Music by: Nuno Malo
- Production company: Strata Productions
- Distributed by: Monterey Media
- Release date: October 7, 2012 (Milwaukee)
- Country: United States
- Language: English

No God, No Master is a 2012 American independent crime suspense thriller directed, written, and produced by Terry Green. The film stars David Strathairn, Ray Wise, Sam Witwer, Alessandro Mario and Edoardo Ballerini. No God, No Master was filmed in Milwaukee, Wisconsin. The story includes references to the 1914 Ludlow Massacre as well as depictions of the Sacco and Vanzetti trial and the 1920 Wall Street bombing.

The film premiered at the 2012 Milwaukee Film Festival.

== Plot ==
In the spring of 1919 a series of package bombs begin to show up on the doorsteps of prominent politicians and businessmen. U.S. Bureau of Investigation Agent William Flynn (Strathairn) is assigned the task of finding those responsible and becomes immersed in an investigation that uncovers an anarchist plot. The film is based on true events.

== Cast ==
- David Strathairn as William J. Flynn
- Sam Witwer as Eugenio Ravarini
- Edoardo Ballerini as Carlo Tresca
- Alessandro Mario as Bartolomeo Vanzetti
- Ray Wise as Attorney General Mitchell Palmer
- Jeff DuJardin as Reporter Tom Benton

== Production ==
=== Development ===
No God, No Master is directed, written, and produced by Terry Green.

=== Filming ===
No God, No Master was filmed in Milwaukee, Wisconsin, USA in 2009 over 24 days at 42 different locations, including Villa Terrace, South Shore Park Pavilion, City Hall and the old Pabst Brewery.

== Release ==
In October 2013, Monterey Media bought the United States distribution rights for release of the film in the United States and Canada in March 2014.

=== Festivals ===
No God, No Master was selected to screen at the 2012 Stony Brook Film Festival.

== Reception ==
As of September 2022 the film holds a 73% rating on Rotten Tomatoes, based on 15 reviews. Metacritic, which uses a weighted average, assigned the film a score of 48 out of 100, based on 7 critics, indicating "mixed or average" reviews.
