= Carlo Valdinoci =

Italian anarchist and Galleanist based in the United States

- Born: c. 1896; Italy
- Died: June 1919; Washington, D.C.
- Known for: Publisher of Cronaca Sovversiva

Carlo Valdinoci was an Italian Galleanist anarchist based in the United States and the publisher of Luigi Galleani's Cronaca Sovversiva. He is believed to have been involved in multiple Galleanist plots.

== Life ==
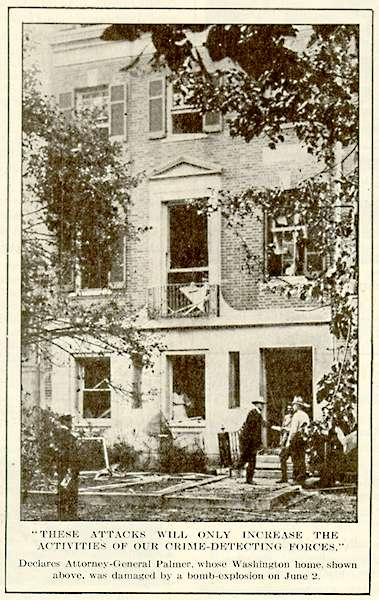
Palmer's damaged house, following a 1919 bomb believed to have been set by Valdinoci

Carlo Valdinoci was born around 1896. He emigrated in July 1913 at the age of 17 from Gambettola, Italy, to live with his brother Ercole in Haverhill, Massachusetts. Valdinoci was the publisher of Luigi Galleani's Cronaca Sovversiva.

Following the April 1917 American entry into World War I and with the subsequent banning of Cronaca Sovversiva under the Espionage Act, members of the Bureau of Investigation began raiding anarchist establishments in June, including the Cronaca Sovversiva offices in Lynn, Massachusetts. While Galleani was soon captured in his home, Valdinoci had already left for Mexico where he and about 60 other Galleanists evaded the draft and planned for the revolution. Their plans fell apart after several months and the group dispersed. Valdinoci left Mexico in September 1917.

Valdinoci operated under pseudonyms from his personal history, including Carlo Lodi, Paco Carlucci, and Carlo Rossini. "Lodi" was his mother's maiden name and "Rossini" was his sister's married name.

Valdinoci is believed to have participated in the Youngstown dynamite plot under the assumed names. As "Paco Carlucci", he called Ella Segata Antolini to Youngstown, Ohio, where they were intimate before she received a satchel of dynamite to transport by train to Chicago. Following a train porter's suspicions, she was searched and caught. Others in Youngstown knew "Carlucci" as "Carlo Lodi". The Bureau of Investigation again raided the Cronaca Sovversiva offices in February 1918 to find Valdinoci, who was not there. Investigators recovered a letter from Valdinoci in Mexico that connected him to the Youngstown plot.

The Bureau of Investigation believed Valdinoci to have died at the site of the 1919 explosion at A. Mitchell Palmer's house. While the body could not be identified from photographs, pieces of its clothing were narrowed to someone with an Italian immigrant background. One firearm found at the scene was traced to a Boston purchaser under a fictitious name and address given as "Luigi Caliseri", a surname that coincided with a relative's name Valdinoci had given on his immigration papers. The purchaser was also said to be a carpenter, which was Valdinoci's profession. A "K.B." laundry mark on the body's collar is thought to be a phonetic capture of Valdinoci's initials "C.V." This coincides with Valdinoci's last sighting (June 1919). His family believed him to be dead. This identification was a break in the mail and pipe bomb investigation that led to finding the printer who printed the "Plain Words" manifesto included in the packages.

== Personal life ==
Valdinoci was known to be youthful and attractive, with a black pompadour. He had a sister.

== Bibliography ==
- Avrich, Paul (1996). Sacco and Vanzetti: The Anarchist Background. Princeton University Press. ISBN 978-0-691-02604-6.
- McCormick, Charles H. (2005). Hopeless Cases: The Hunt for the Red Scare Terrorist Bombers. Lanham, Maryland: University Press of America. ISBN 978-0-7618-3132-7. OCLC 60358652.
