= Wall Street bombing =

1920 bombing in New York City, U.S.

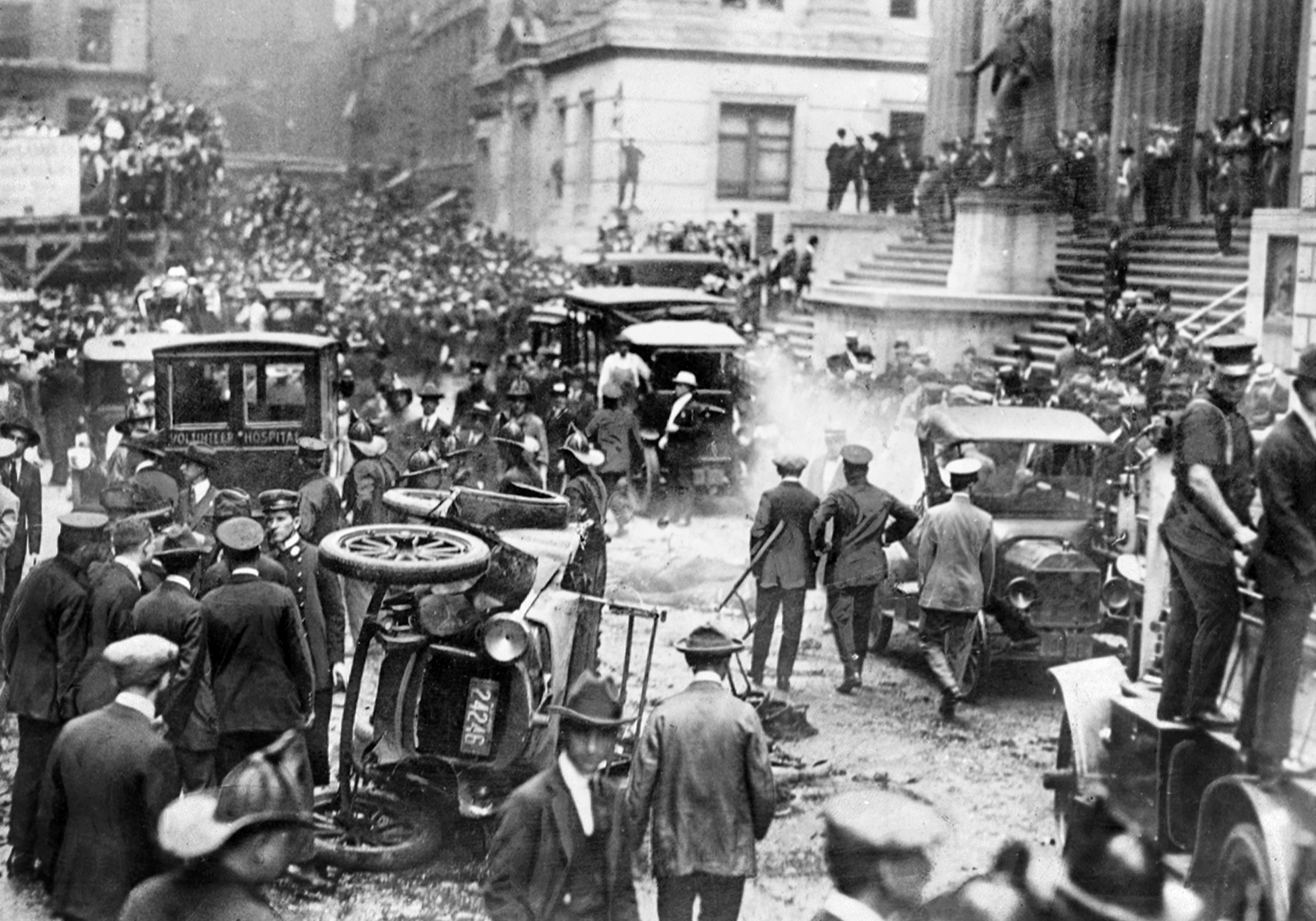
- The aftermath of the explosion. Federal Hall National Memorial is at the right.
- Location: 40.7070°N 74.0103°W; Manhattan, New York City
- Date: September 16, 1920; 106 years ago 12:01 pm
- Target: Wall Street
- Attack type: Horse-drawn wagon bomb Animal-borne bomb attack
- Deaths: 38 (plus one horse)
- Injuries: 143 seriously injured, several hundred total
- Motive: Possible revenge for the arrests of Sacco and Vanzetti and/or the deportation of Luigi Galleani

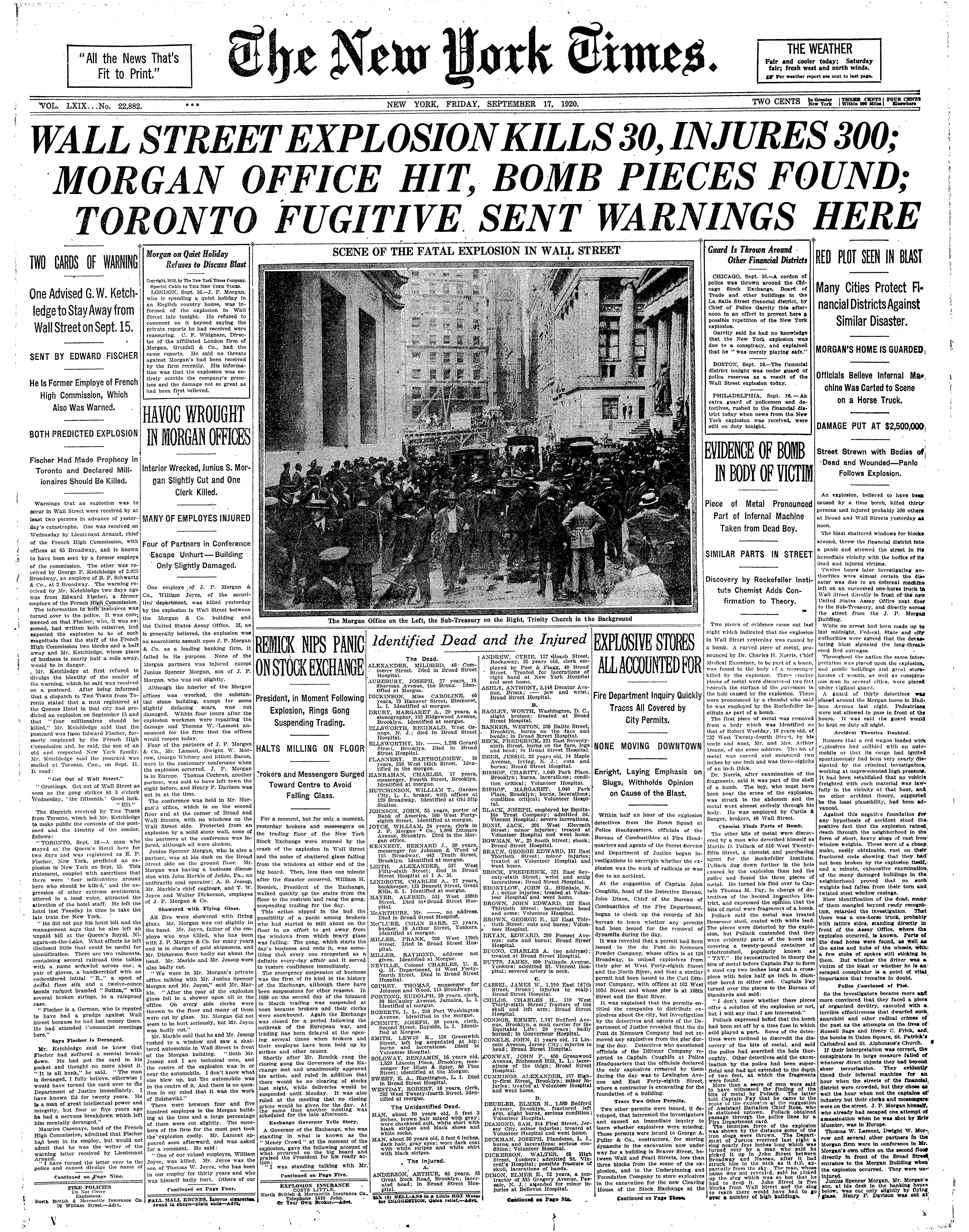
Cover of The New York Times reporting on the Wall Street bombing.

The Wall Street bombing was an act of terrorism on Wall Street at 12:01 pm on Thursday, September 16, 1920. The blast killed 30 people immediately, and another eight later died of wounds that they sustained in the blast. There were 143 seriously injured, and the total number of injured was in the hundreds.

The bombing was never solved, although investigators and historians believe it was carried out by Galleanists, an anarchist communist group responsible for a series of bombings the previous year.

== Attack ==
At noon, a horse-drawn wagon passed by lunchtime crowds on Wall Street and stopped across the street from the headquarters of the J.P. Morgan & Co. bank at 23 Wall Street, on the Financial District's busiest corner. Inside the wagon, 100 pounds (45 kg) of dynamite with 500 pounds (230 kg) of heavy, cast-iron sash weights exploded in a timer-set detonation, sending the weights tearing through the air. The horse and wagon were blasted into small fragments, but the driver was seen by witnesses leaving the vehicle and escaping down a side street.

The 38 fatalities were mostly young people who worked as messengers, stenographers, clerks, and brokers. Many of the wounded suffered severe injuries. The bomb caused more than US$2 million ($32.1 million today) in property damage and destroyed most of the interior spaces of the Morgan building.

Within one minute of the explosion, William H. Remick, president of the New York Stock Exchange (NYSE), suspended trading in order to prevent a panic. Outside, rescuers worked feverishly to transport the wounded to the hospital. James Saul, a 17-year-old messenger, commandeered a parked car and transported 30 injured people to an area hospital. Police officers rushed to the scene, performed first aid, and appropriated all nearby automobiles as emergency transport vehicles.

== Reaction ==
The Justice Department's Bureau of Investigation (BOI, the forerunner of the Federal Bureau of Investigation, or FBI) did not immediately conclude that the bomb was an act of terrorism. Investigators were puzzled by the number of innocent people killed and the lack of a specific target, other than buildings that suffered relatively superficial, non-structural damage. Exploring the possibility of an accident, police contacted businesses that sold and transported explosives. By 3:30 pm, the board of governors of the NYSE had met and decided to open for business the next day. Crews cleaned up the area overnight to allow for normal business operations, but in doing so they destroyed physical evidence that might have helped police investigators solve the crime. The Sons of the American Revolution had previously scheduled a patriotic rally for the day after (September 17) to celebrate Constitution Day at exactly the same intersection. On September 17, thousands of people attended the rally in defiance of the previous day's attack.

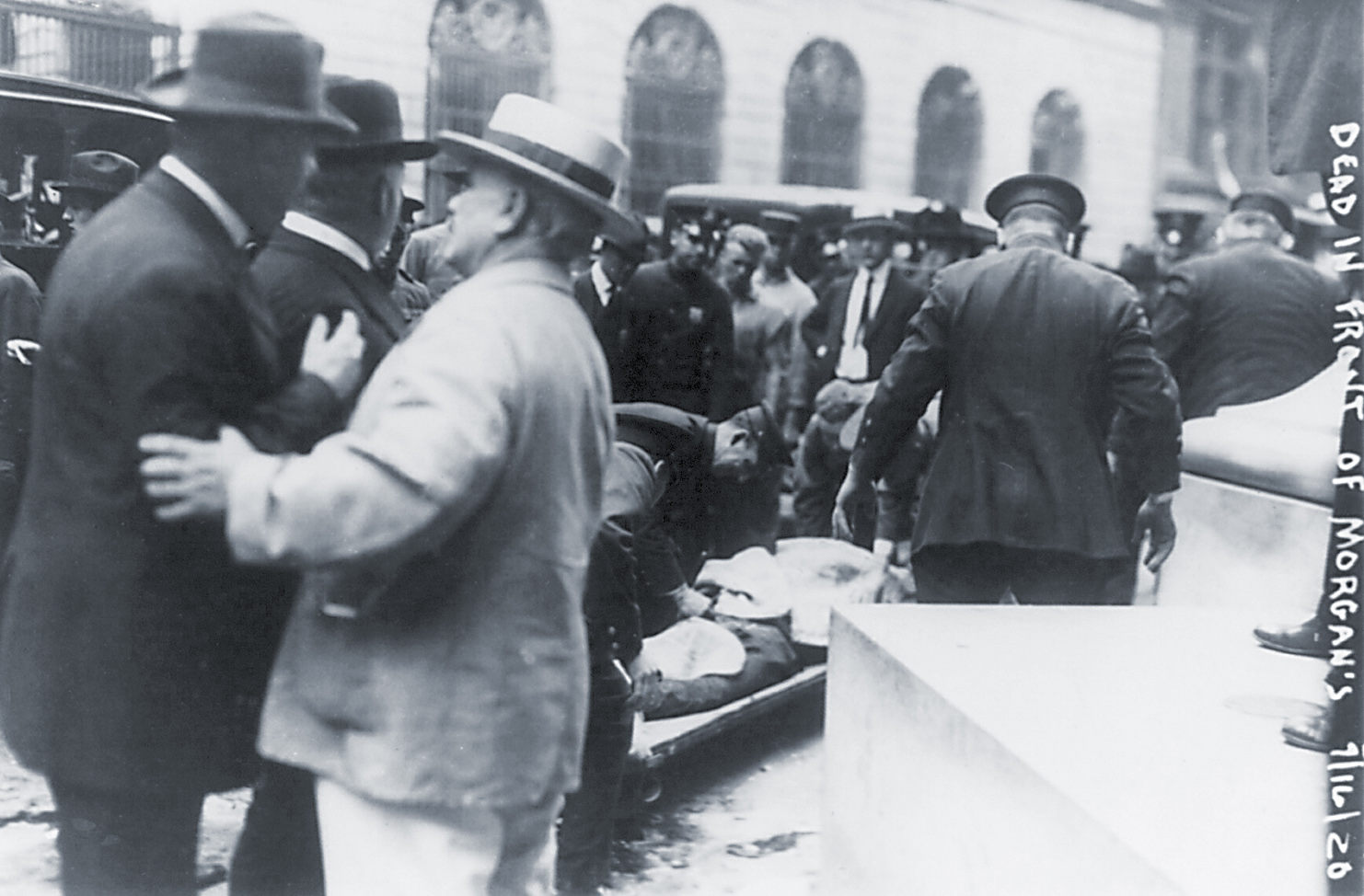
Captioned "Dead in front of [J.P.] Morgan's [bank]", taken on the day of the bombing

The New York assistant district attorney noted that the timing, location, and method of delivery all pointed to Wall Street and J.P. Morgan as the targets of the bomb, suggesting in turn that it was planted by radical opponents of capitalism, such as Bolsheviks, anarchists, communists, or militant socialists. Investigators soon focused on radical groups opposed to U.S. financial and governmental institutions and known to use bombs as a means of violent reprisal. Often throughout the Gilded Age, radical ideology and violence was used as a form of protest by groups to initiate change. When simple protests were not enough, these extremists would resort to ruthless measures to be heard. Although the violence proved to be detrimental to their overall cause, many historians saw that this was a clear point of radical behavior aimed at facilitating transformation throughout the classes. They observed that the Wall Street bomb was packed with heavy sash weights designed to act as shrapnel, then detonated on the street in order to increase casualties among financial workers and institutions during the busy lunch hour.

Officials eventually blamed anarchists and communists for the Wall Street bombing. The Washington Post called the attack an "act of war". The bombing stimulated renewed efforts by police and federal investigators to track the activities and movements of foreign radicals. Public demands to track down the perpetrators led to an expanded role for the BOI, including the bureau's General Intelligence Division headed by J. Edgar Hoover. The New York City Police Department (NYPD) also pushed to form a "special, or secret, police" to monitor "radical elements" in the city.

On September 17, the BOI released the contents of flyers found in a post office box in the Wall Street area just before the explosion. Printed in red ink on white paper, they said: "Remember, we will not tolerate any longer. Free the political prisoners, or it will be sure death for all of you." At the bottom was: "American Anarchist Fighters". The BOI quickly decided that the flyer eliminated the possibility of an accidental explosion. William J. Flynn, director of the BOI, suggested the flyers were similar to those found at the June 1919 anarchist bombings.

== Investigations ==
The BOI's investigation was stalled when none of the victims of the bombing turned out to be the driver of the wagon. Even though the horse was newly shod, investigators could not locate the owner of the stable who was responsible for the work. When the blacksmith was located in October, he could offer the police little information. Investigators questioned tennis champion Edwin Fischer, who had sent warning postcards to friends, telling them to leave the area before September 16. He told police he had received the information "through the air". They found Fischer made a regular habit of issuing such warnings, and had him committed to Amityville Asylum, where he was diagnosed as insane but harmless.

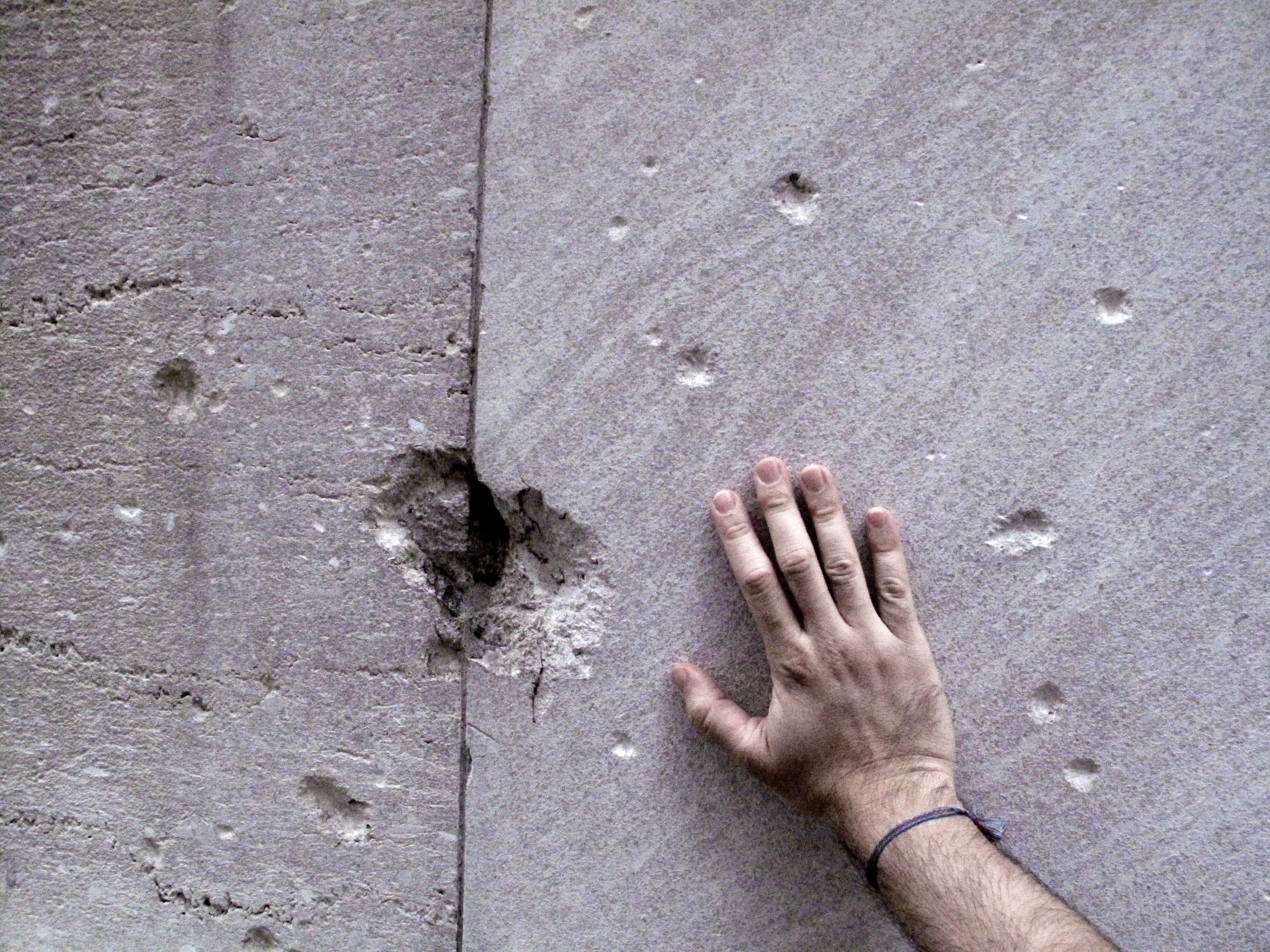
Remnants of the damage from the 1920 bombing are still visible on 23 Wall Street.

The BOI and local police investigated the case for over three years without success. Occasional arrests garnered headlines but each time they failed to support indictments. Most of the initial investigation focused on anarchists and communists, such as the Galleanist group, whom authorities believed were involved in the 1919 bombings. During President Warren G. Harding's administration, officials evaluated the Soviet Union and the Communist Party USA as possible masterminds of the bombing. In 1944, the FBI, successor to the BOI, investigated again. It concluded that its agents had explored many radical groups, "such as the Union of Russian Workers, the I.W.W., Communist, etc. ... and from the result of the investigations to date it would appear that none of the aforementioned organizations had any hand in the matter and that the explosion was the work of either Italian anarchists or Italian terrorists."

One Galleanist in particular, Italian anarchist Mario Buda (1884–1963), an associate of Sacco and Vanzetti and the owner of a car which led to the arrest of the latter for a separate robbery and murder, is alleged by some historians, including Paul Avrich, to be the man most likely to have planted the bomb. Avrich and other historians theorize that Buda acted in revenge for the arrest and indictment of Sacco and Vanzetti. Buda's involvement as the Wall Street bombmaker was confirmed by statements made by his nephew Frank Maffi and fellow anarchist Charles Poggi, who interviewed Buda in Savignano sul Rubicone, Italy, in 1955. Buda (at that time known by the alias of Mike Boda) had eluded authorities at the time of the Sacco and Vanzetti arrests, was experienced in the use of dynamite and other explosives, was known to use sash weights as shrapnel in his time bombs, and is believed to have constructed several of the largest package bombs for the Galleanists. These included the Milwaukee Police Department bombing, which was a large black powder bomb that killed nine policemen in Milwaukee, Wisconsin. However, he was neither arrested nor questioned by police.

After leaving New York, Buda resumed the use of his real name in order to secure a passport from the Italian vice-consul, then promptly sailed for Naples. By November, he was back in his native Italy, never to return to the United States. Galleanists still in the U.S. continued the bombing and assassination campaign for another 12 years, culminating in a 1932 bomb attack targeting Webster Thayer, the presiding judge in the Sacco and Vanzetti trial. Thayer, who survived the ensuing blast that destroyed his house and injured his wife and housekeeper, moved his residence to his club for the last year and a half of his life, where he was guarded 24 hours a day.

== In media ==
The bombing has inspired several books, notably The Day Wall Street Exploded by Beverly Gage and The Death Instinct (2010) by Jed Rubenfeld.

Upton Sinclair wrote about this event in his 1927 book Oil! He did not believe that there was any conspiracy, instead, he believed that the bombing was the result of an act of negligence which was committed by a truck driver who ignored the rules for the safe transportation of hazardous materials while he was carrying them.

The bombing is the subject of the PBS series American Experience episode "The Bombing of Wall Street", broadcast in February 2018.

Additionally, the bombing is depicted in the 2012 period thriller film No God, No Master.

== See also ==
- Animal-borne bomb attacks
- Terrorism in the United States
  - Domestic terrorism in the United States
    - Political violence in the United States
      - Timeline of terrorist attacks in the United States
- List of unsolved murders (1900–1979)
