= William H. Lamar =

American lawyer (1859–1928)

William Harmong Lamar

Assistant Attorney-General, and Solicitor, Post-Office Department

Personal details
- Born: 11 December 1859 Auburn, Alabama, US
- Died: 10 February 1928 (aged 68) Walter Reed General Hospital (WRGH), Washington, DC
- Party: Democratic
- Spouse: Virginia Longstreet
- Education: Alabama Polytechnic; Georgetown University
- Occupation: Attorney
- Known for: Prosecution of mail fraud

William Harmong Lamar (born December 11, 1859 – February 10, 1928) was an American lawyer.

== Family ==
The son of Dr. William Harmong Lamar, and Ann Maria Lamar, née Glenn, William Harmong Lamar was born in Auburn, Alabama, on December 11, 1859; he had five siblings.

He married Virginia Longstreet on June 21, 1887. They had four children: Mrs. Virginia Longstreet Matthews, née Lamar (1889–1977); Mrs. Augusta Glenn "Gussie" Lytle, née Lamar (1891–1973); Lucius Quintus Cinncinatus Lamar (1892–1954); and William Harmong Lamar III (1897–1970). William H. Lamar IV is, As of 2025 pastor of the Metropolitan African Methodist Episcopal Church in Washington DC.

== Education ==
He received a Bachelor of Arts (A.B.) from Alabama Polytechnic in 1881, a Bachelor of Laws (LL.B.) from Georgetown University in 1884, and a Master of Laws (LL.M.) in 1885, also from Georgetown.

== Military service ==
During the Spanish–American War, he served as a captain in the US Volunteer Signal Corps and in public relations campaigns for the war.

== Professional life ==
He began his practice of law in Washington, D.C. and Rockville, Maryland shortly after graduation and was elected to the Maryland House of Delegates in 1894 as a Democrat.

He served as an assistant attorney for the United States Department of Justice from 1906 to 1913.

Following the election of Woodrow Wilson, a fellow Democrat, as President, he was made assistant attorney-general and Solicitor of the Post Office Department (1913-1921), because of which he was targeted by anarchists for assassination in the 1919 United States anarchist bombings.

He left office after the election of Warren Harding, a Republican, as President in 1921 and served in private practice with his son Lucius until his death in 1928.

== Affiliations ==
He was a member of the American Bar Association, the Maryland Bar Association, Alpha Tau Omega and Phi Delta Phi. He was also a Methodist.

== Death ==
He died at the Walter Reed General Hospital (WRGH), Washington, D.C., on February 10, 1928, and was buried at the Arlington National Cemetery.
