= Gabriella Segata Antolini =

Italian–American anarchist (1899–1984)

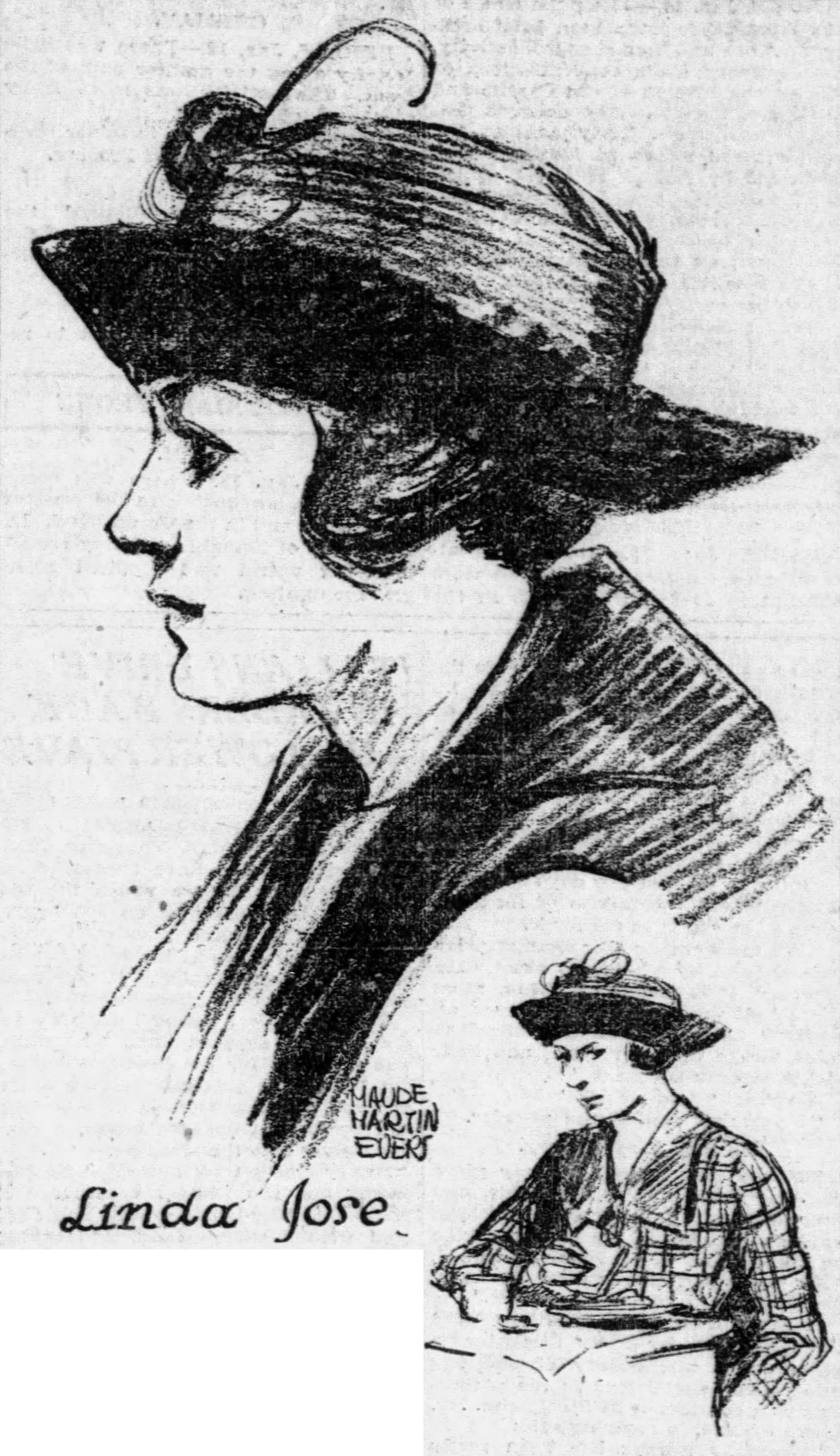
Sketch by Maude Martin Evers for the Chicago Tribune, January 19, 1918

Gabriella (Ella) Segata Antolini (1899–1984) was an Italian–American anarchist activist.

== Personal life ==
Antolini was born in 1899 in the province of Ferrara and immigrated to the United States with her family in 1913. Her family worked as contract laborers in Louisiana and later settled in Connecticut, where they found employment in manufacturing. Antolini began working as a factory laborer at the age of fourteen and only received one year of elementary school.

== Anarchism ==
Antolini joined the anarchist movement, specifically the Galleanist movement, in 1916 after having prior exposure to the newspaper Cronaca Sovversiva through her brother Alberto, the same year she married her husband August Segata, a member of Italian rebel organization Gruppo I Liberi. The following year Antolini joined the organization herself. It is through the anarchist movement that she met Carlo Valdinoci, who later became her lover.

In 1918 Antolini was arrested for transporting dynamite to Chicago and spent six months in a prison in Jefferson City, Missouri alongside Emma Goldman and Kate Richards O'Hare, who were imprisoned in the same facility. While in jail Goldman and O'Hare became friendly with Antolini, the latter of whom helped Antolini improve her English skills. While Antolini was in prison her husband Segata "vanished from sight" and was believed to have returned to Italy. Historians have no further information on Segata after this point.

Following her release, Antolini moved to Detroit, where she met and married a Sicilian man named Jerome Pomilia. The two had a son, Febo Pomilia.
