= Luigi Galleani =

Italian anarchist and communist (1861–1931)

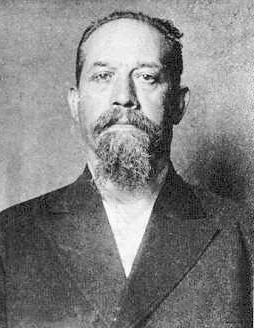
- 1919 police photograph of Galleani
- Born: 12 August 1861; Vercelli, Piedmont, Kingdom of Italy
- Died: 4 November 1931 (aged 70); Caprigliola, Aulla, Tuscany, Kingdom of Italy
- Notable work: Cronaca Sovversiva; La Salute è in voi!; Aneliti e Singulti: Medaglioni; The End of Anarchism?
- Movement: Insurrectionary anarchism
- Spouse: Maria Galleani
- Children: 4

Luigi Galleani (Italian: [luˈiːdʒi ɡalleˈaːni]; 12 August 1861 – 4 November 1931) was an Italian insurrectionary anarchist and communist best known for his advocacy of "propaganda of the deed", a strategy of political assassinations and violent attacks.

Born in Vercelli, he became a leading figure in the Piedmont labor movement, for which he was sentenced to exile on the island of Pantelleria. In 1901, he fled to the United States and he joined the Italian immigrant workers movement in Paterson, New Jersey. He subsequently moved to Vermont and Massachusetts, where he launched the radical newspaper Cronaca Sovversiva. He gained many dedicated followers among Italian American anarchists, known as the Galleanisti, who carried out a series of bombing attacks throughout the United States.

For his involvement in the anti-war movement during World War I, he was deported back to Italy, where he was subjected to political repression following the rise of fascism. During the final years of his life, he published The End of Anarchism?, a defense of anarchist communism from criticisms by reformist socialists. He rejected reformism, in favor of "continuous attack" against institutions of capitalism and the state, and opposed any form of formal organization, which he saw as inherently corrupting and hierarchical.

== Biography ==
=== Early life ===
Luigi Galleani was born on 12 August 1861, into a middle-class family, in the Piedmontese city of Vercelli. He first became interested in anarchism while studying law at the University of Turin, eventually renouncing his career in law in order to carry out anarchist propaganda against capitalism and the state. His skill in oratory and writing quickly made him a leading voice in the new generation of the Italian anarchist movement. Alongside Sicilian anarchist Pietro Gori, he led a resurgence of militant anarchist activism, which gained a large following among the workers of Northern Italy.

=== Labor movement activism ===
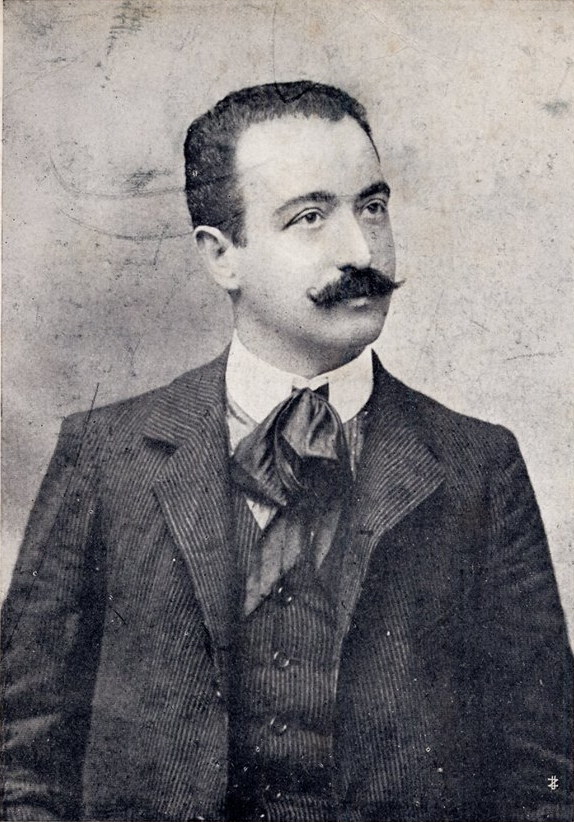
Pietro Gori, one of Galleani's close collaborators in the Italian anarchist movement

By the mid-1880s, the anarchists had already lost ground to the Italian Workers' Party (POI), which developed a large support base among northern workers. The anarchists were initially skeptical of the POI, due to the latter's tendencies towards workerism and reformism, but relations between the two parties became more cordial over time. In 1887, Galleani led the Piedmontese anarchist movement's reorientation towards the labor movement and its rapprochement with the POI. That year, he established the Turin-based newspaper Gazzetta Operaia, formed a number of workers' organizations in Vercelli, and distributed revolutionary propaganda among the factory workers of Biella. In 1888, he went on a lecture tour in towns throughout Piedmont and led a series of strike actions by Piedmontese workers in both Turin and Vercelli, increasing support for the anarchist movement and the POI.

Relations between the anarchists and the POI worsened, due to the latter's continued participation in local elections. Nevertheless, Galleani continued to pursue the anarchist infiltration of the POI, in order to attempt to bring it towards revolutionary socialism. He continued to advocate for a conciliatory approach between the reformists and revolutionaries, resulting in the POI both continuing its electoral participation while also endorsing class conflict. Although he prevented a formal split from occurring, the two factions were ultimately irreconciable and Galleani's attempts to transform the POI proved unsuccessful.

When he was threatened with arrest for his radical activism, in 1889 he fled to France and then to Switzerland. There he collaborated with the French anarchist geographer Élisée Reclus in the preparation of his Nouvelle Geographie Universalle and organised a students' demonstration at the University of Geneva, in honor of the Haymarket martyrs. Galleani was also scheduled to attend the Italian anarchist movement's Capolago congress, but en route to the congress from Geneva, he was arrested by the Swiss authorities and expelled back to Italy. Back in Italy, he immediately continued his radical activities, embarking on a speaking tour of Tuscany, with the aim of fomenting an uprising on International Workers' Day of 1891.

In 1892, together with Pietro Gori and Calabrese anarchist Giovanni Domanico, Galleani was delegated to represent the anarchists at the Genoa Workers' Congress, with the intention of obstructing the motions of the dominant reformist faction. In opposition to the social democrats, led by Lombard lawyer Filippo Turati, an alliance was formed by the anarchists and the workerists, who both opposed political participation. On 14 August, a fierce argument broke out between the anarchist and socialist delegates, leading to two separate meetings being convened the following day. Having finally forced the anarchists to split from the movement, Turati's social democratic majority established the new Italian Socialist Party (PSI), despite the objections of Galleani and his fellow delegates, whose own attempts at forming an anarchist party were unsuccessful. The congress proved that Galleani's agitational campaign had ultimately failed to gain a mass following among the workers, leading to many Italian anarchists becoming disillusioned with the labor movement, which came under the direction of the PSI.

=== Exile ===
In the wake of the Fatti di Maggio (Bava Beccaris massacre), the Italian government launched a new campaign of political repression against the anarchist movement, arresting anarchists en masse and internally exiling them to small islands for up to five years, all without a trial. Galleani himself was swiftly arrested, convicted for conspiracy, and exiled to the Sicilian island of Pantelleria. There he met and married Maria Rallo, who already had a young son. Luigi and Maria Galleani had four children of their own.

With Elisee Reclus's aid, Galleani managed escape from Italy to Egypt, where he stayed with other Italian immigrants for a year. When he was threatened with extradition back to Italy, he fled to the United States, arriving in October 1901, shortly after the assassination of United States President William McKinley.

=== Life in the United States ===
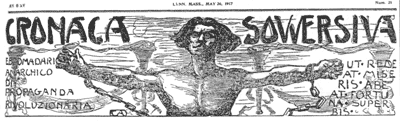
Cronaca Sovversiva header

Galleani settled in Paterson, New Jersey, a hub for Piedmontese immigrant silk weavers and dyers, where he took up editing the Italian anarchist newspaper La Questione Sociale. He became a vocal supporter of the 1902 Paterson silk strike, giving a series of speeches in which he called for a revolutionary general strike to overthrow capitalism. When the striking workers clashed with police, he was shot in the face and charged for incitement to riot. He escaped to Canada and recovered from his wounds, before covertly returning over the border and hiding out in Barre, Vermont, where he stayed with Tuscan stonemasons from Carrara. With these new comrades, on 6 June 1903, he launched Cronaca Sovversiva, which rapidly became the most influential Italian anarchist periodical in North America, receiving worldwide distribution. Through this new publication, in 1905 he published the bomb-making manual La Salute è in voi!, in which he supplied to his readers the formula for making nitroglycerine, compiled by a friend and explosives expert, Professor Ettore Molinari. Galleani also translated and published the memoirs of Clément Duval, a French illegalist who he admired and who his associates had hidden after his escape from a French penal colony to the United States.

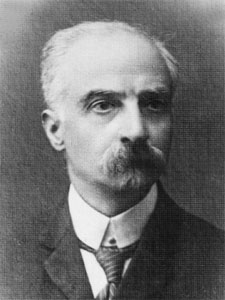
Socialist politician Francesco Saverio Merlino, whose critique of anarchism provoked Galleani to write his book The End of Anarchism?

In 1906, the editor of the rival Italian socialist newspaper Il Proletario publicised Galleani's location and he was quickly located by the authorities. Arrested, he was brought back to Paterson and tried for incitement, although a hung jury resulted in him being released. He returned to Barre, where he once again resumed giving fiery speeches and writing hundreds of articles for his newspaper, quickly becoming a leading voice in the Italian American anarchist movement. In late 1907, in response to Neapolitan socialist Francesco Saverio Merlino's public renunciation of anarchism in favour of reformist labor unionism, Galleani published a series of articles in defense of anarchism. By this time, he had become disillusioned with the labor movement and came to reject labor unions entirely, instead adopting an anti-organizational form of anarchism, which became the dominant tendency within the Italian American anarchist movement. He even openly broke with the anarcho-syndicalist Carlo Tresca over the latter's cooperation with the Industrial Workers of the World, causing a rift between their followers that undermined the Italian American anarchist movement's cohesion.

Galleani gained many militant and highly devoted followers, known as the Galleanisti, who likewise rejected all formal organization and developed markedly extremist tendencies. These disciples included Nicola Sacco and Bartolomeo Vanzetti, who promoted Galleani's lectures and distributed his literature. The Galleanisti, following Galleani's anti-organizational principles, formed small, tight-knit cells made up of "self-selecting individuals". Although they rejected formal leadership, Galleani himself was treated with reverence and he had the status of an unofficial leader.

=== Deportation and death ===
Following the American entry into World War I, Galleani became a leading voice in the anti-war movement, declaring that the anarchist movement was "Against the War, Against the Peace, For Social Revolution!" In response to the Selective Service Act of 1917 being passed into law, he urged his followers to refuse registration and go into hiding, with he and many of his comrades moving to a cabin in the woods near Taunton, Massachusetts. At his direction, some Galleanisti escaped to Mexico, from which they planned to return to Italy, where they believed a revolution was imminent. Despite the ongoing Mexican Revolution, Galleani had rejected the possibility of an anarchist revolution in Mexico itself, due to its high population of people of color, whom he characterized as "uninterested" racial groups.

His anti-war activities made him a target for political repression by the American government. On 17 June 1917, federal agents raided the offices of the Cronaca Sovversiva in Lynn, Massachusetts, arresting Galleani and shutting down the newspaper. Charged with conspiracy, he and eight of his followers were subsequently deported back to Italy, leaving his family behind in the United States, on 24 June 1919.

He attempted to continue publishing Cronaca Sovversiva upon arrival in Turin, but it was quickly suppressed by the Italian authorities. In the wake of the March on Rome in 1922, he was arrested and convicted of sedition by the new fascist authorities, which sentenced him to 14 months in prison. After being released, he concluded his polemic against Merlino, writing a further series of articles and publishing them together in his book The End of Anarchism? (1925). While the book was hailed by Neapolitan anarchist Errico Malatesta as a key text in anarchist communism, in November 1926, it provoked his arrest by the fascist authorities, on charges of insulting the Italian dictator Benito Mussolini. Galleani spent time in the cell he had been kept in for months in 1892, before being banished to Lipari and later Messina, where he was imprisoned for 6 months.

In February 1930, he was granted compassionate release due to his failing health. He retired to Caprigliola, a 'frazione' of Aulla, where he was kept under close and constant surveillance. After returning from a walk through the countryside, during which he was followed by the police, he collapsed from a heart attack, dying on 4 November 1931.

== Political ideology ==
Galleani's conception of anarchist communism combined the insurrectionary anarchism expounded by German individualist Max Stirner with the mutual aid advocated by Russian communist Peter Kropotkin. He defended the principles of revolutionary spontaneity, autonomy, diversity, self-determination and direct action, and advocated for the violent overthrow of the state and capitalism through propaganda of the deed.

He rejected all forms of formal organization, including anarchist federations and labor unions, and opposed participating in the labor movement, as he believed it was inherently reformist and susceptible to corruption. From his rejection of reformism, he concluded that social change could only be brought about through violent attacks against institutions, which he believed could build towards a popular insurrection. As such, he publicly endorsed terrorism, or what he called "propaganda of the deed", which came in the form of the assassination of authority figures and the expropriation of private property. Galleani defended both the assassination of William McKinley by Leon Czolgosz and the assassination of Umberto I of Italy by Gaetano Bresci.

In his own words, his ultimate aim was to establish "a society without masters, without government, without law, without any coercive control—a society functioning on the basis of mutual agreement and allowing each member the freedom to enjoy absolute autonomy." But he also rejected prefigurative politics, such as that advocated by anarcho-syndicalists, as he believed that people themselves would instinctively understand how to live as a free and equal society once the state and capitalism were overthrown.

== Legacy ==
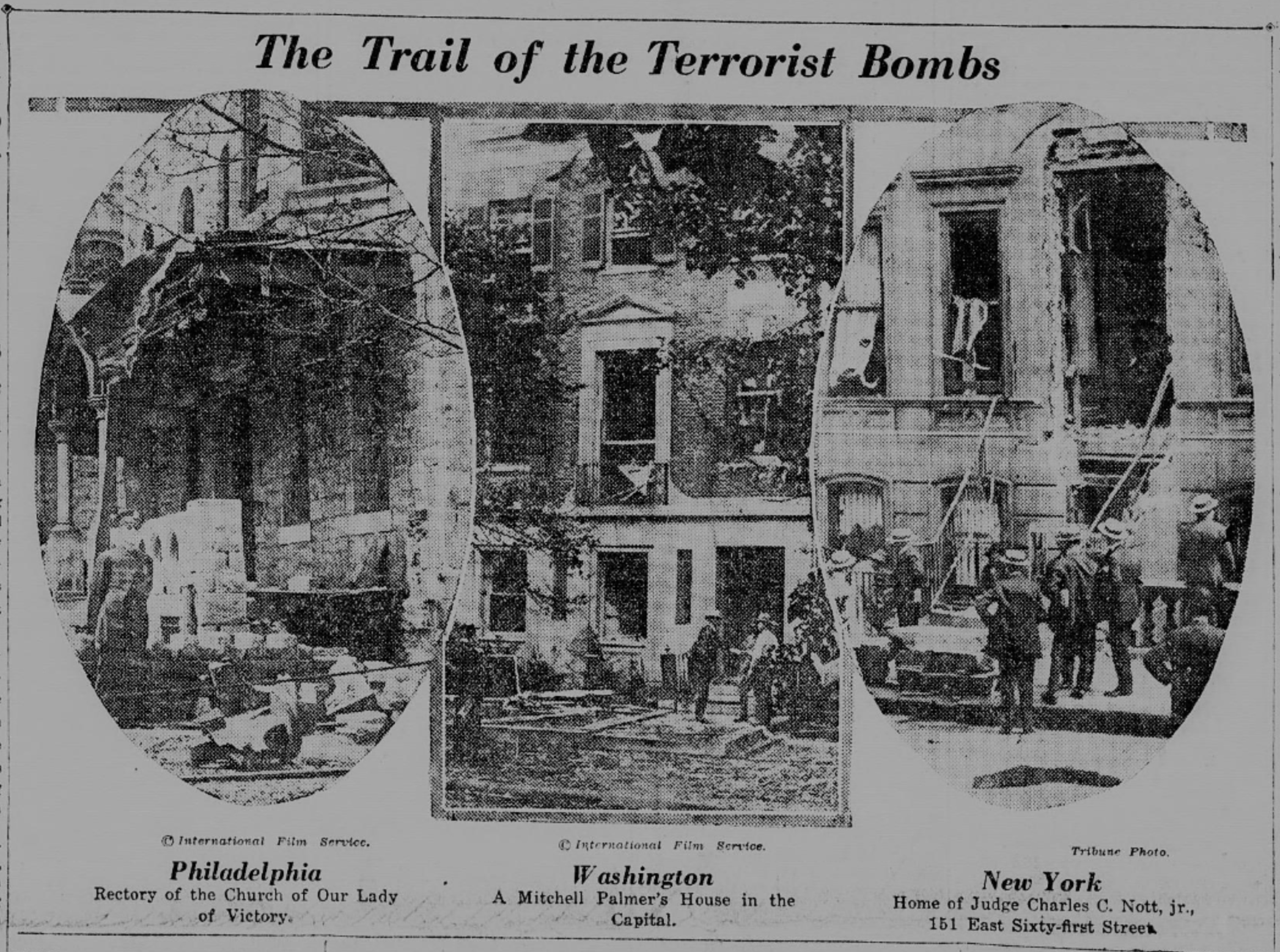
Coverage of the 1919 United States anarchist bombings by the New-York Tribune

In retaliation for Galleani's deportation from the United States, the Galleanisti launched a campaign of terrorist attacks, carrying out a series of bombings in 1919. In April 1919, the Galleanisti sent around thirty bombs out to government officials. Most of the bombs were intercepted and disarmed before reaching their destination, with only one detonating - injuring the intended target's maid. In June 1919, they carried out a coordinated attack of nine bombings throughout the northeastern United States, but none of their targets were killed or gravely wounded. One of the bombs detonated prematurely outside Attorney General A. Mitchell Palmer's house, killing the attacker. Another bomb that was placed in a church detonated following its discovery by police, killing ten police officers and a bystander. In the political repression that followed, many of the Galleanisti were arrested, including Italian American anarchists Nicola Sacco and Bartolomeo Vanzetti, who were executed despite the lack of evidence against them. In reprisal, the Galleanist Mario Buda was alleged to have carried out the Wall Street bombing of 1920, which killed 33 people.

During the 1930s, the Romanian American anarchist Marcus Graham attempted to revive the Galleanist movement with the San Francisco-based newspaper Man!, but its efforts were unsuccessful and the paper was shut down in 1939. By the time of the defeat of Italian Fascism in World War II, the Italian American anarchist movement had largely dissipated. The Galleanist L'Adunata dei refrattari continued publication until 1971, when it was succeeded by the anti-authoritarian periodical Fifth Estate.

By the late-20th century, Galleani's figure had fallen into obscurity, receiving relatively little research from scholars. It was only in 1982, when The End of Anarchism? received a translation into English, that interest in him again began to grow. In 2006, more English translations of his work were published in a compilation by AK Press.

== Selected works ==
- (1914) Contro la guerra, contro la pace, per la rivoluzione sociale; English translation: Against War, Against Peace, For The Social Revolution (1983, Centrolibri Books)
- (1925) La fine dell'Anarchismo?; English translation: The End of Anarchism? (1982, Cienfuegos Press)
- (1927) Il principio dell'organizzazione alla luce dell'anarchismo; English Translation: The Principal of Organization to the Light of Anarchism (2006, Pirate Press)

== See also ==
- 1919 United States anarchist bombings
- First Red Scare
- Immigration Act of 1903

== Bibliography ==
- Avrich, Paul (1988). "Sacco and Vanzetti: The Italian Anarchist Background". Anarchist Portraits. Princeton University Press. pp. 162–175. ISBN 0-691-04753-7. LCCN 88-9889.
- Avrich, Paul (1991). Sacco and Vanzetti: The Anarchist Background. Princeton University Press. doi:10.2307/j.ctv131bwkz. ISBN 0-691-04789-8. JSTOR j.ctv131bwkz. LCCN 90-40838. S2CID 241652737.
- Avrich, Paul (1995). Anarchist Voices: An Oral History of Anarchism in America. Princeton University Press. ISBN 0-691-03412-5. LCCN 94-16620.
- Bencivenni, Marcella (2011). Italian Immigrant Radical Culture: The Idealism of the Sovversivi in the United States, 1890-1940. New York University Press. ISBN 978-0-8147-9103-5. LCCN 2010048336.
- Bencivenni, Marcella (2017). "Fired by the Ideal: Italian Anarchists in New York City, 1880s–1920s". In Goyens, Tom (ed.). Radical Gotham: Anarchism in New York City from Schwab's Saloon to Occupy Wall Street. University of Illinois Press. pp. 54–76. ISBN 9780252099595. LCCN 2017007713.
- Cornell, Andrew (2016). Unruly Equality: U.S. Anarchism in the Twentieth Century. University of California Press. ISBN 978-0-520-28675-7. LCCN 2015022451.
- Guglielmo, Jennifer (2010). Living the Revolution: Italian Women's Resistance and Radicalism in New York City, 1880-1945. University of North Carolina Press. ISBN 9780807898222.
- Pernicone, Nunzio (1993). Italian Anarchism, 1864-1892. Princeton University Press. ISBN 0-691-05692-7. LCCN 92-46661.
- Pernicone, Nunzio; Ottanelli, Fraser M. (2018). Assassins Against the Old Order: Italian Anarchist Violence in Fin De Siècle Europe. University of Illinois Press. doi:10.5406/j.ctv513d7b. ISBN 978-0-252-05056-5. OCLC 1050163307. S2CID 197856146.
- Shone, Steve J. (2013). "Luigi Galleani: Is Anarchism Dead?". American Anarchism. Studies in Critical Social Sciences. Vol. 57. Brill. pp. 193–206. doi:10.1163/9789004251953_009. ISBN 9789004251953.
- Zimmer, Kenyon (2015). Immigrants Against the State: Yiddish and Italian Anarchism in America. University of Illinois Press. ISBN 978-0-252-03938-6. LCCN 2015940460.
