= Galleanisti =

Followers of insurrectionary anarchist and communist Luigi Galleani

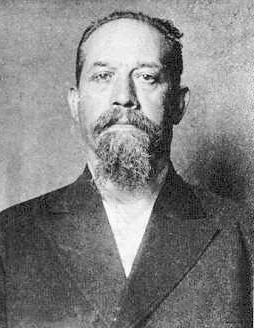
Luigi Galleani, c. 1912

Galleanisti (Italian for Galleanists) were the followers or supporters of Luigi Galleani, an Italian immigrant to the United States who operated as an insurrectionary anarchist in the US. The vast majority of Galleanisti or Galleanists were similarly poor and working-class Italian immigrants or Italian Americans, especially anarchists and those involved in the labor movement. Galleanists remain the primary suspects in a campaign of bombings between 1914 and 1920 in the United States.

Galleani and his group promoted radical anarchism by speeches, newsletters, labor agitation, political protests, secret meetings, and, above all, direct action, often referred to as propaganda of the deed. Many used bombs and other violent means to promote their political position, practices that Galleani actively encouraged but in which he apparently did not participate, except for writing the bomb-making manual La Salute è in voi!.

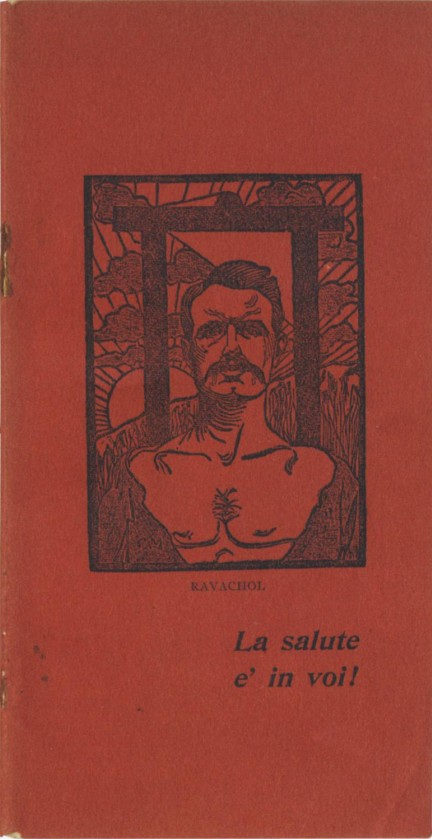
The early 1900s bomb-making manual, La Salute è in voi, associated with the Galleanists, whose anonymous authors were suspected to be Luigi Galleani and chemist Ettore Molinari. The cover featured a woodcut of French anarchist Ravachol, in front of a guillotine, by Charles Maurin (1893).

== Composition ==
The Galleanisti were a group of Italian anarchists and radicals in the United States who followed Luigi Galleani and his message of "heroic" violence in the face of capitalist oppression. Galleani was a figurehead in the Italian anarchist movement who, following the violence of the 1913 Paterson silk strike, turned from promoting a general strike to promoting individual acts of violence against capitalist targets. He believed that the spectacle of terrorism would trigger popular revolt. For the part of his followers, Galleani prompted a symbolic war that continued after his deportation and the raid on the offices of his newspaper, Cronaca Sovversiva.

The police used La Salute è in voi, Galleani's Italian-language bomb-making handbook, to profile accused anarchists. Historians later used the handbook as proof of Galleanist responsibility for crimes and detectives referenced it as evidence of Galleanist conspiracy. Its invocation represented power through threat of violence.

Galleani attracted numerous radical friends and/or followers into the Galleanisti, including Frank Abarno, Gabriella Segata Antolini, Pietro Angelo, Luigi Bacchetti, Mario Buda (also known as "Mike Boda"), Carmine Carbone, Andrea Ciofalo, Ferrucio Coacci, Emilio Coda, Alfredo Conti, Nestor Dondoglio (also known as "Jean Crones"), Roberto Elia, Luigi Falzini, Frank Mandese, Riccardo Orciani, Nicola Recchi, Giuseppe Sberna, Andrea Salsedo, Raffaele Schiavina, Carlo Valdinoci, and, most notably, Nicola Sacco and Bartolomeo Vanzetti.

Carlo Buda, the brother of Galleanist bombmaker Mario Buda, said of him, "You heard Galleani speak, and you were ready to shoot the first policeman you saw."

== Activities ==
Galleanists were primary suspects in a campaign of bombings between 1914 and 1920. Instances included mail bombs to business and government officials and the 1920 Wall Street bombing, which killed 38 people. In effect, however, none of the Galleanisti bombs hit their targets: capitalists, police, or judges. Their casualties were themselves and bystanders. Their bombing methods borrowed from the Italian Black Hand extortion rackets, in which the attacker would write a threat of future violence and place bombs in doorways. These extortionists adapted fireworks, a popular Italian industry, with shrapnel or stolen dynamite from construction jobs. Anarchists, however, lacked the community experience with high explosives and thus overestimated their ability to create working bombs and underestimated their own risk.

=== Bresci Circle ===
New York City Galleanisti formed the Bresci Circle in honor of Gaetano Bresci, the anarchist assassin of Umberto I of Italy. By 1914, almost 600 members met regularly at a rundown house in East Harlem (or Italian Harlem). A plot to bomb the Rockefellers increased police interest in the group.

Several months after the 1914 Ludlow Massacre that had incensed Galleanisti, a group of anarchists carried a bomb to the Tarrytown estate of the Ludlow coal mine owner, John D. Rockefeller, in July 1914. They miscalculated, both in failing to trigger the device and since Rockefeller was then out of town. A member of the Circle was arrested and the bomb, which they carried to an East Harlem tenement near the Circle's headquarters, exploded, demolishing half of the building and killing three anarchists.

While no group took responsibility for four additional bombings in 1914, the police continued to suspect the Bresci Circle. In October 1914, bombs exploded at St. Patrick's Cathedral and the priest's house at St. Alphonsus Church. There were also attacks on the Bronx County Courthouse and the Tombs, a Manhattan jail. The newly inaugurated New York City bomb squad sent undercover detectives to infiltrate the group. The plant coordinated a trap for an attempted bombing at St. Patrick's in March 1915 that involved fifty disguised officers and caught Frank Abarno and Carmine Carbone. The anarchists and police differ in their accounts of initial meetings, including Abarno and Carbone accusing the police of entrapment, since the undercover agent supplied the bomb materials and laboratory. Their trial revolved around La Salute è in voi and the defendants' right to read any books of any kind, including bomb-making handbooks. They ultimately received sentences for six to twelve years. The case rekindled fear of easily accessible bomb-making instructions and sensationalism around anarchism.

=== 1916 ===
One Chicago-based Galleanist, chef Nestor Dondoglio, known by the alias Jean Crones, laced soup with arsenic in an attempt to poison some 100 guests, all figures in industry, business, finance, or law, at a banquet in 1916 to honor Archbishop Mundelein. J.B. Murphy, a doctor among the guests, furnished a hastily prepared emetic that induced vomiting. None of the guests died, though many suffered greatly. Police discovered many vials of poison when they searched Dondoglio's rooms, but never apprehended him. Dondoglio left a series of taunts for the police, then fled to the East Coast. He survived in abject poverty, hidden in the homes of other Galleanists, until his death in 1932.

On December 6, 1916, the Galleanist Alfonso Fagotti was arrested for stabbing a policeman during a riot in Boston's North Square. On December 17, Galleanists exploded a bomb at the Salutation Street station of the Boston harbor police. Fagotti was convicted, imprisoned, and later deported to Italy.

Some historians have also suspected the Galleanists of perpetrating the Preparedness Day bombing in San Francisco on July 22, 1916. No known Galleanists were among those indicted for the attack, but the time bomb's design and construction – a cast steel pipe packed with explosives, a timing mechanism, and metal slugs designed to act as shrapnel and increase casualties – was typical of later Galleanist bombing campaigns, the work of Mario Buda in particular. Additionally, in an ominous apparent reference to the earlier mass poisoning by the Galleanist Nestor Dondoglio, San Francisco police recovered two unsigned letters urging the head waiter at the St. Francis Hotel to poison soup served to Police Commissioner James Woods, one of the organizers of the Preparedness Day march.

=== Mexico ===
About 60 Galleanisti left for Mexico following the April 1917 American entry into World War I and Galleani's advice to avoid draft registration. Their motives for emigrating varied from draft evasion to fighting the then-ongoing Mexican Revolution to preparing for an expected revolutionary moment in Italy. Morale quickly waned as they created new identities but struggled to find work, communicate through language barriers, contribute to the Mexican Revolution, and accept that the Italian revolution would not be forthcoming. Growing increasingly disillusioned, the group split by August, with most traveling north for work and some traveling south for Latin America.

=== 1917–1918 ===
Mario Buda is thought to have constructed the large black powder bomb with an acid "delay" detonator that exploded on November 24, 1917, at a Milwaukee police station. Patrolmen had taken it there after its discovery in a church basement. The blast killed nine policemen and a female civilian, one of the worst incidents of terrorist violence in the United States up to that time. The bomb appeared to have been directed at Reverend August Giuliana, who had recently led a street revival meeting opposed by local anarchists.

In late 1917 and early 1918, bombings occurred in New York City, San Francisco, Washington, D.C., Boston, and Milwaukee that were later attributed to Galleanists, but no criminal prosecutions followed. In February 1918, U.S. authorities raided the offices of Cronaca Sovversiva, suppressed publication, and arrested its editors. Although a staff member hid the subscription list, officials gained more than 3,000 names and addresses of subscribers from an issue already prepared for mailing.

On January 17, 1918, a 19-year-old Galleanist, Gabriella Segata Antolini, was arrested for transporting a satchel filled with dynamite, which she had received from Carlo Valdinoci. When questioned, Antolini gave a false name and refused to cooperate with the police; she was imprisoned for fourteen months before being released. While in prison, Antolini met the noted anarchist Emma Goldman, with whom she became friends.

On December 30, 1918, the Philadelphia homes of the President of the Chamber of Commerce, the Acting Superintendent of Police, William B. Mills, and Judge Robert von Moschzisker were heavily damaged by explosive bombs filled with metal slugs, an act later attributed to the Galleanist group. A woman standing across the street from Superintendent Mills' home was struck above the eye by a metal slug. At each site leaflets were scattered denouncing "the priests, the exploiters, the judges and police, and the soldiers" whose time was coming to an end.

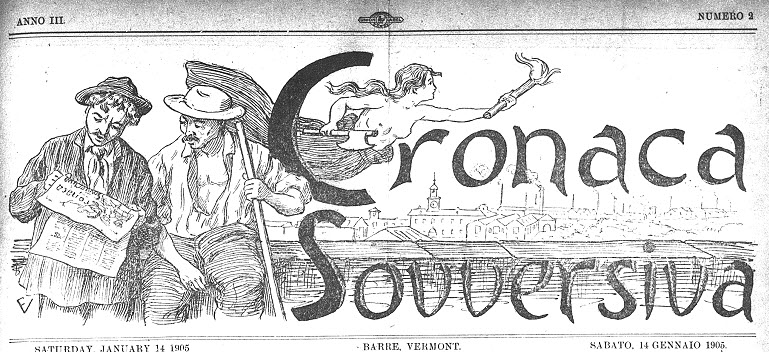
Masthead of the Cronaca Sovversiva Italian-language American anarchist newspaper, in 1905

In response to the violence and social unrest, in October 1918, Congress passed the Immigration Act of 1918, also known as the Anarchist Exclusion Act, a law that expanded the list of activities that defined someone as an anarchist and justified deportation. In turn, Galleani and his followers distributed a flyer in February 1919 that said: "Deportation will not stop the storm from reaching these shores. The storm is within and very soon will leap and crash and annihilate you in blood and fire... We will dynamite you!" A series of bombings of prominent businessmen and officials followed, including a bomb at the home of Judge von Moschzisker, who in 1908 had sentenced four Italian anarchists to long prison terms.

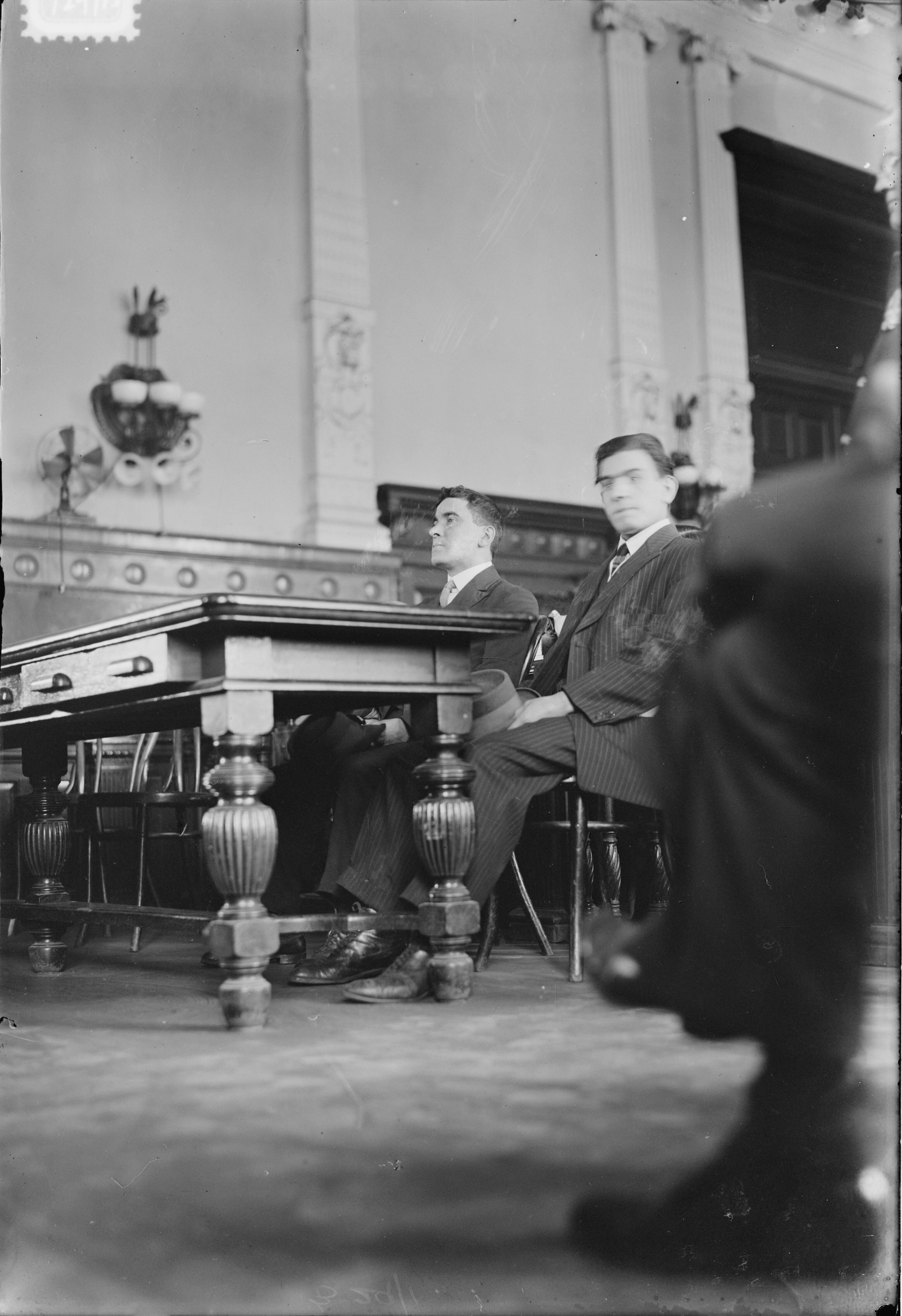
Abarno and Carbone of the "Bresci Circle" in court

=== 1919 ===
On February 27, 1919, Galleani spoke to an anarchist gathering in Taunton, Massachusetts. The next night four Galleanists who had attended the rally attempted to place a bomb at the American Woolen Co. mill in nearby Franklin, whose workers were on strike. The bomb exploded prematurely, killing all four of the men. In late April 1919, approximately 36 dynamite package bombs, all with identical packaging and addressed to a cross-section of politicians, justice officials, and businessmen, including John D. Rockefeller, were sent through the mail. An early lead to the identity of the bombers was revealed when one package bomb was found addressed to a Bureau of Investigation (BOI) field agent, Rayme Weston Finch. Finch had been tracking several Galleanists, including Carlo Valdinoci, and the agent's successes, such as leading the raid on Cronacca Sovversiva and his arrest of Raffaele Schiavina and Andrea Ciafolo, were well known to Galleanist militants. The Galleanists intended their bombs to be delivered on May Day, the international day of communist, anarchist, and socialist revolutionary solidarity. Only a few of the packages were delivered. Because the plotters had neglected to add sufficient postage, one of the packages was discovered, and its distinctive markings enabled the interception of most of the rest. No one was killed by the mail bombs that were delivered, but a black housekeeper, Ethel Williams, had her hands blown off when she opened a package sent to the home of Senator Thomas W. Hardwick, a sponsor of the Immigration Act of 1918.

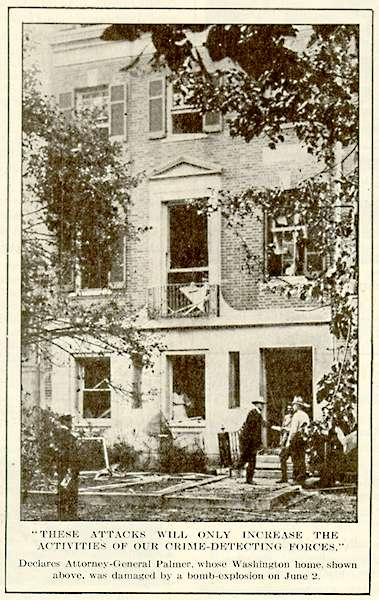
Damage from the bomb intended for Palmer

In June 1919, the Galleanists managed to explode eight large bombs nearly simultaneously in several different U.S. cities. Targets included the homes of judges, businessmen, a mayor, an immigration inspector, and a church. The new bombs used up to twenty-five pounds of dynamite packed with metal slugs to act as shrapnel, all contained in a cast steel pipe. Among the intended victims were politicians who had endorsed anti-sedition laws and deportation, or judges such as Charles C. Nott, who had sentenced anarchists to long prison terms. The homes of Mayor Harry L. Davis of Cleveland, Judge W.H.S. Thompson, Massachusetts State Representative Leland Powers, and Attorney General A. Mitchell Palmer, already a previous target of a Galleanist mail bomb, were attacked. None of the officials was killed, but the explosions killed William Boehner, a 70-year-old night watchman, who had stopped to investigate the package left on Judge Nott's doorstep, as well as one of the most wanted Galleanists – Carlo Valdinoci, a former editor of Cronaca Sovversiva, and a close associate of Galleani, who blew himself up as he laid a package bomb at the door of Attorney General Palmer's home.

Though not injured, Palmer and his family were shaken by the blast and their house was largely destroyed. The blast hurled several neighbors from their beds. Either Valdinoci tripped over his bomb or it went off prematurely as he was placing it on Palmer's porch. The police collected his remains over a two-block area. All of the bombs were accompanied by a flyer that read:

War, Class war, and you were the first to wage it under the cover of the powerful institutions you call order, in the darkness of your laws. There will have to be bloodshed; we will not dodge; there will have to be murder: we will kill, because it is necessary; there will have to be destruction; we will destroy to rid the world of your tyrannical institutions.

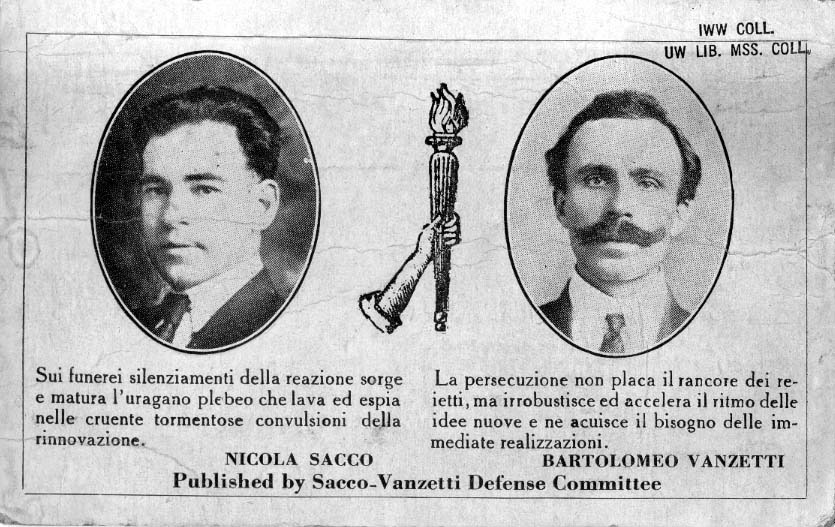
An Italian-language postcard produced by the Nicola Sacco and Bartolomeo Vanzetti Defense Committee, in 1927. Two Italian immigrant anarchists whose trial and eventual execution became an international cause célèbre.

Police eventually traced a flyer accompanying the bombs to the print shop where Andrea Salsedo, a typesetter, and Roberto Elia, a compositor, were arrested. Salsedo was questioned intensively (some say tortured) by federal agents. After providing some information, he was said to have become increasingly distraught. He died after jumping or being pushed by his compatriot Elia out of the window in the 14th-story room where he was being held. Although Salsedo had admitted that he was an anarchist and had printed the flyer, no other arrests for the bombings followed. The police lacked evidence and other Galleanists refused to talk. Elia was deported; according to his lawyer, he turned down an offer to remain in the United States if he would deny his connection to the Galleanists, asserting that his refusal to talk "is my only title of honor".

After Valdinoci's death, Coacci and Recchi appeared to have taken more prominent roles in the group; both were bombmakers. Recchi lost his left hand to a premature explosion, but kept making bombs. Postal workers and police also found bombs before they detonated or failed, including many of the 36 mail bombs in 1919.

With the public and the press clamoring for action, US Attorney General Palmer and other government officials began a series of investigations. They used warrantless wiretaps, reviews of subscription records to radical publications, and other measures to investigate thousands of anarchists, communists, and other radicals. With evidence in hand and after agreement with the Immigration Department, the Justice Department arrested thousands in a series of coordinated police actions known as the "Palmer Raids" and deported several hundred of them under the Anarchist Exclusion Act.

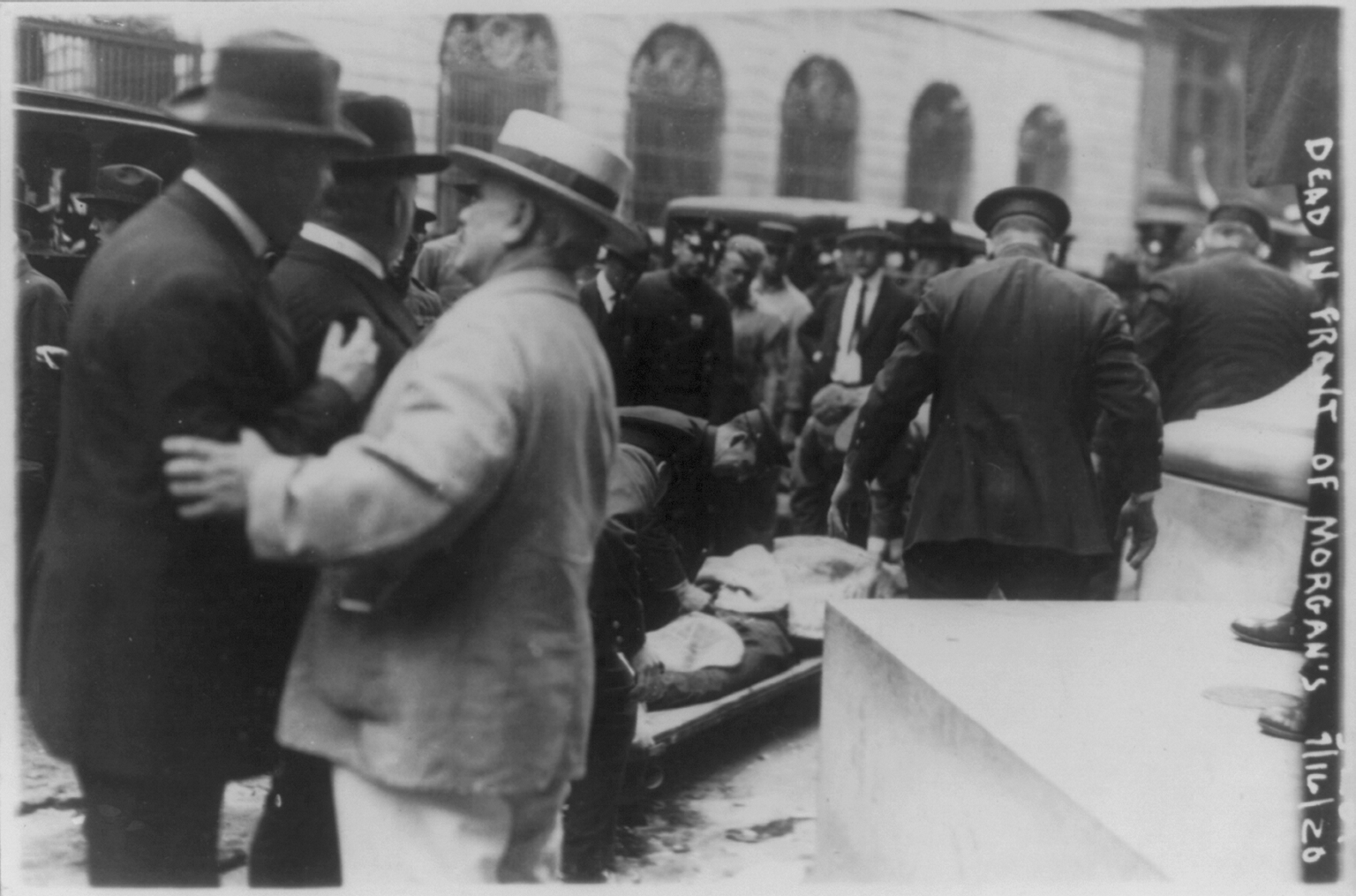
Aftermath of the 1920 Wall Street bombing

=== Wall Street bombing ===
Following Galleani's deportation and the indictment of Sacco and Vanzetti for murder, more bombings occurred in the U.S. Followers of Galleani, especially Buda, were suspected in the Wall Street bombing of 1920, which killed 38 people and severely wounded 143. Historians believe Buda to be the bomber, as revenge for the indictment of Sacco and Vanzetti, his friends. Buda possibly had experience with dynamite from work in Michigan. The Wall Street explosion was timed for noon, a busy time of day. An extortionist leaflet found nearby demanded the release of political prisoners.

=== Later activities ===
In 1927, more bombings were attributed to Galleanists, especially as several court and prison officials were targeted, including Webster Thayer, the trial judge in the Sacco-Vanzetti case. and their executioner, Robert Elliott. In 1932, Thayer was a target again; the front of his house was destroyed by a package bomb, and his wife and housekeeper were injured, but he was unscathed. Thayer lived in the Boston University Club until his death, guarded by a private bodyguard and police.

After being deported to Italy, Coacci and Recchi quickly departed for Argentina. There Coacci joined forces with the Argentine anarchist Severino Di Giovanni, another advocate of revolutionary violence. Di Giovanni would be executed for his crimes and Coacci deported from Argentina. After World War II, Coacci returned and lived there for the rest of his life. Buda returned to Italy shortly after the Wall Street bombing, and lived there until his death in 1963.

== See also ==
- Propaganda of the deed
- First Red Scare
- Illegalism
- Sacco and Vanzetti
- Palmer Raids
