= Sacco and Vanzetti: The Anarchist Background =

1991 history book by Paul Avrich

- First edition
- Author: Paul Avrich
- Subject: American history, anarchism
- Published: 1996 (Princeton University Press)
- Pages: 280
- ISBN: 9780691026046

Sacco and Vanzetti: The Anarchist Background is a 1991 history book by Paul Avrich about Sacco and Vanzetti with a special emphasis on anarchist sources.
