= Cronaca Sovversiva =

Italian-language anarchist newspaper based in the United States (1903–1920)

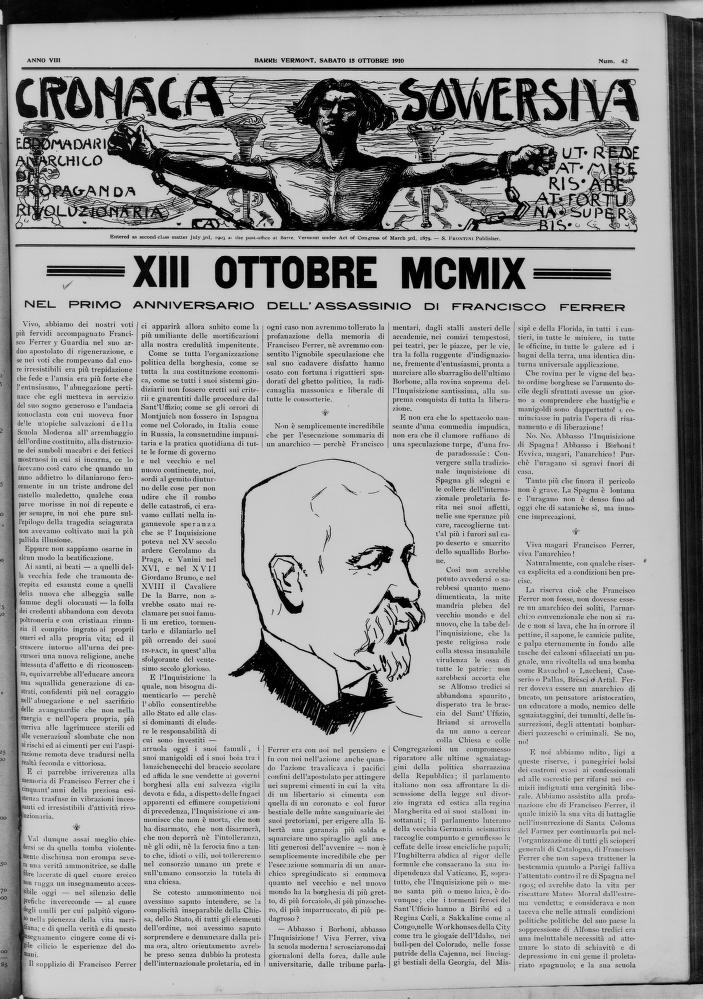
Front page of the October 13, 1909 issue of Cronaca Sovversiva.

Cronaca Sovversiva (English: Subversive Chronicle) was an Italian-language, United States–based anarchist newspaper associated with Luigi Galleani from 1903 to 1920. It is one of the country's most significant anarchist periodicals.

== History ==
Prior to founding Cronaca Sovversiva, Luigi Galleani became involved in anarcho-communist activism beginning in the 1880s and showed a predilection for speaking and writing convincingly on the topic. After escaping an Italian prison sentence, he traveled through to Paterson, New Jersey, in 1901. After being wounded during the 1902 Paterson silk strike and charged with incitement to riot, he first escaped to Canada before settling in Barre, Vermont, under an assumed name among Italian quarriers. There he began publishing the Italian-language anarchist newspaper Cronaca Sovversiva in 1903.

The newspaper was banned from Italy in October 1915, and from the United States Mail in June 1917. He continued to print the newspaper and distribute it cross-country via Railway Express and a network of supporters who delivered it locally.

== Bibliography ==
- McCormick, Charles H. (2005). Hopeless Cases: The Hunt for the Red Scare Terrorist Bombers. Lanham, Maryland: University Press of America. ISBN 978-0-7618-3132-7. OCLC 60358652.
