= Matthew Brady (lawyer) =

American lawyer

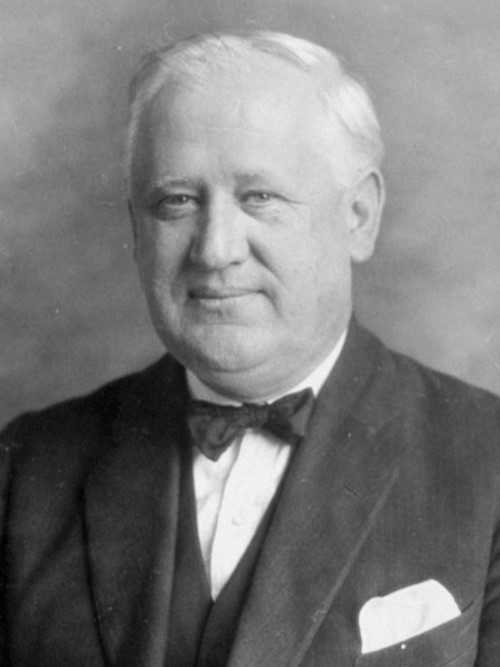
- Brady in 1925

20th District Attorney of San Francisco
- In office January 8, 1920 – January 8, 1944
- Preceded by: Charles Fickert
- Succeeded by: Pat Brown

Personal details
- Born: April 1, 1876 San Francisco, California, U.S.
- Died: August 5, 1952 (aged 76) San Francisco, California, U.S.
- Resting place: Holy Cross Cemetery (Colma, California)
- Party: Democratic
- Spouse: Irene Brady (m. 1946)
- Education: Hasting's School of Law
- Profession: Lawyer

Matthew A. Brady (April 1, 1876 – August 5, 1952) was an American lawyer and politician who served as district attorney of San Francisco from 1920 to 1944. He previously served on the San Francisco Civil Service Commission and as a police judge.

== Biography ==
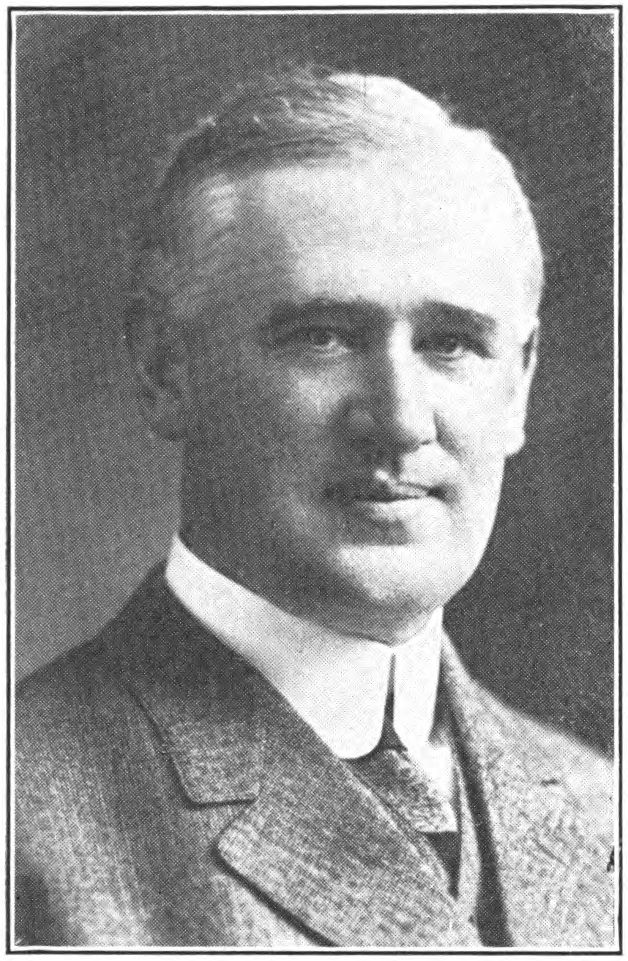
Brady as a police judge, 1915

Brady defeated previous district attorney Charles Fickert, who was responsible for the conviction of Tom Mooney and Warren Billings in the Preparedness Day bombing. By 1926, he was convinced that Mooney and Billings were unjustly convicted. In a letter to Governor Friend W. Richardson, Brady wrote "If these matters that have developed during the trials could be called to the attention of a court that had jurisdiction to grant a new trial, undoubtedly a new trial would be granted. Furthermore, if a new trial were granted, there would be no possibility of convicting Mooney or Billings." In 1935, he empaneled a grand jury and hired private investigator Edwin Atherton to report on police corruption in the San Francisco Police Department.

Brady presided over numerous high-profile cases in the 1920s and 1930s, including the three Fatty Arbuckle murder trials, and the arrest and roundup of Communists. His conduct in the Arbuckle trials has been harshly condemned by later commentators. Driven by intense political ambition, aiming for the governorship, he pressured witnesses to give false testimony, suppressed evidence of Arbuckle’s innocence, and relied on a primary accuser, Maude Delmont, whom he knew to be an unreliable extortionist and never actually called to testify.

In 1936, Brady was D.A. during the infamous sterilization plot charged by Ann Cooper Hewitt, 21-year-old heiress, and daughter of Peter Cooper Hewitt, against her mother, Marion Jeanne Andrews, accused of sterilizing her daughter, Ann, to thwart an inheritance dependent on the young woman having children, in a climate of California Eugenics law, and aided by Dr. Tilton E Tillman and Samuel G. Boyd.

He was defeated for reelection by Pat Brown in 1943, which was the second time the two had competed for the office.
