= 1906 California gubernatorial election =

- November 6, 1906
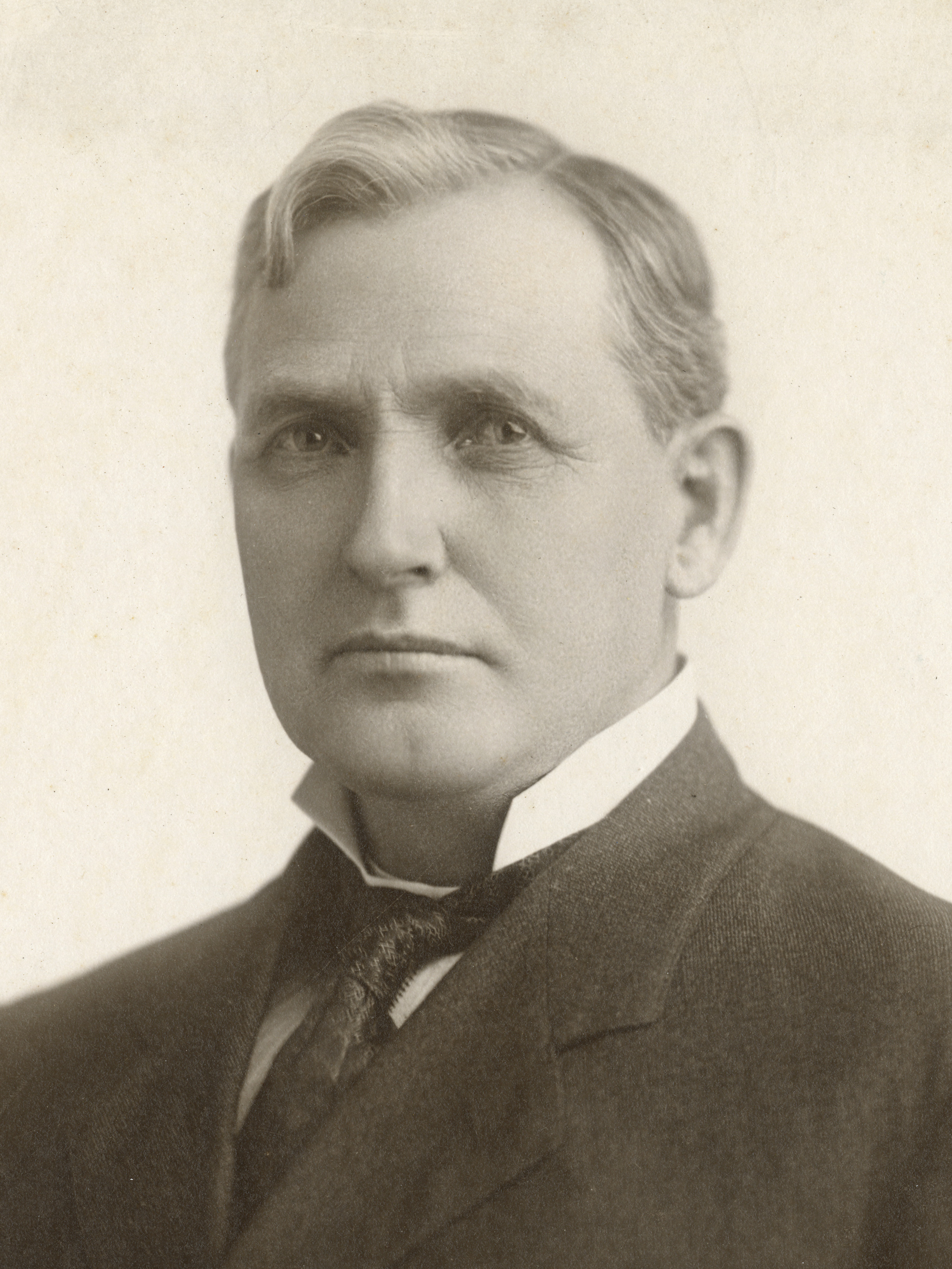

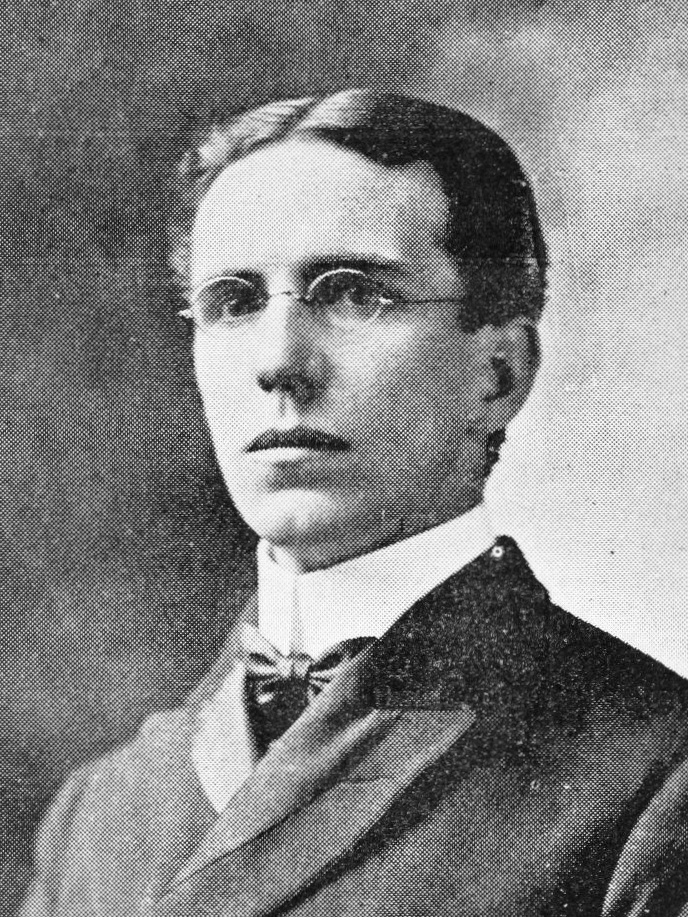

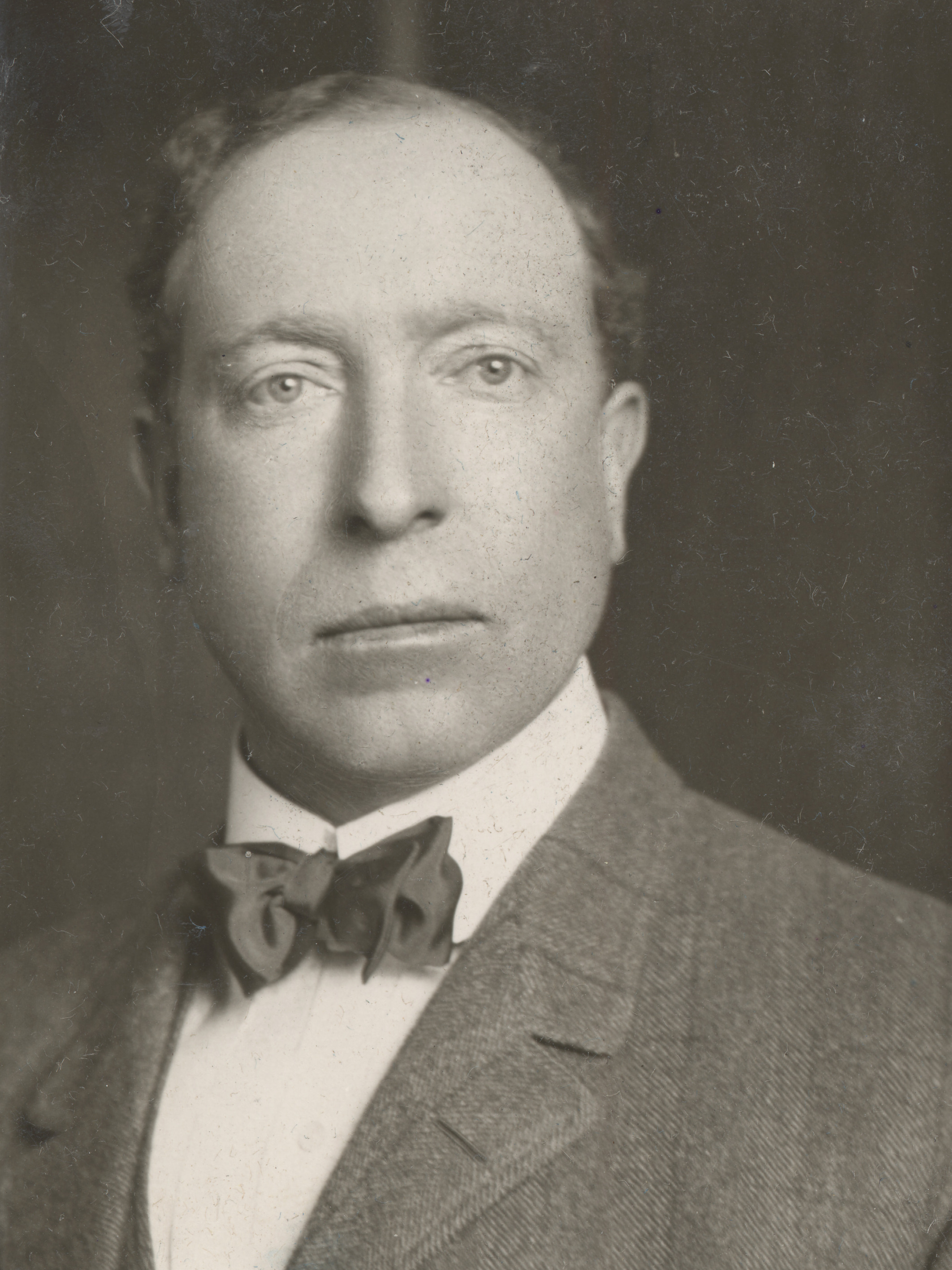

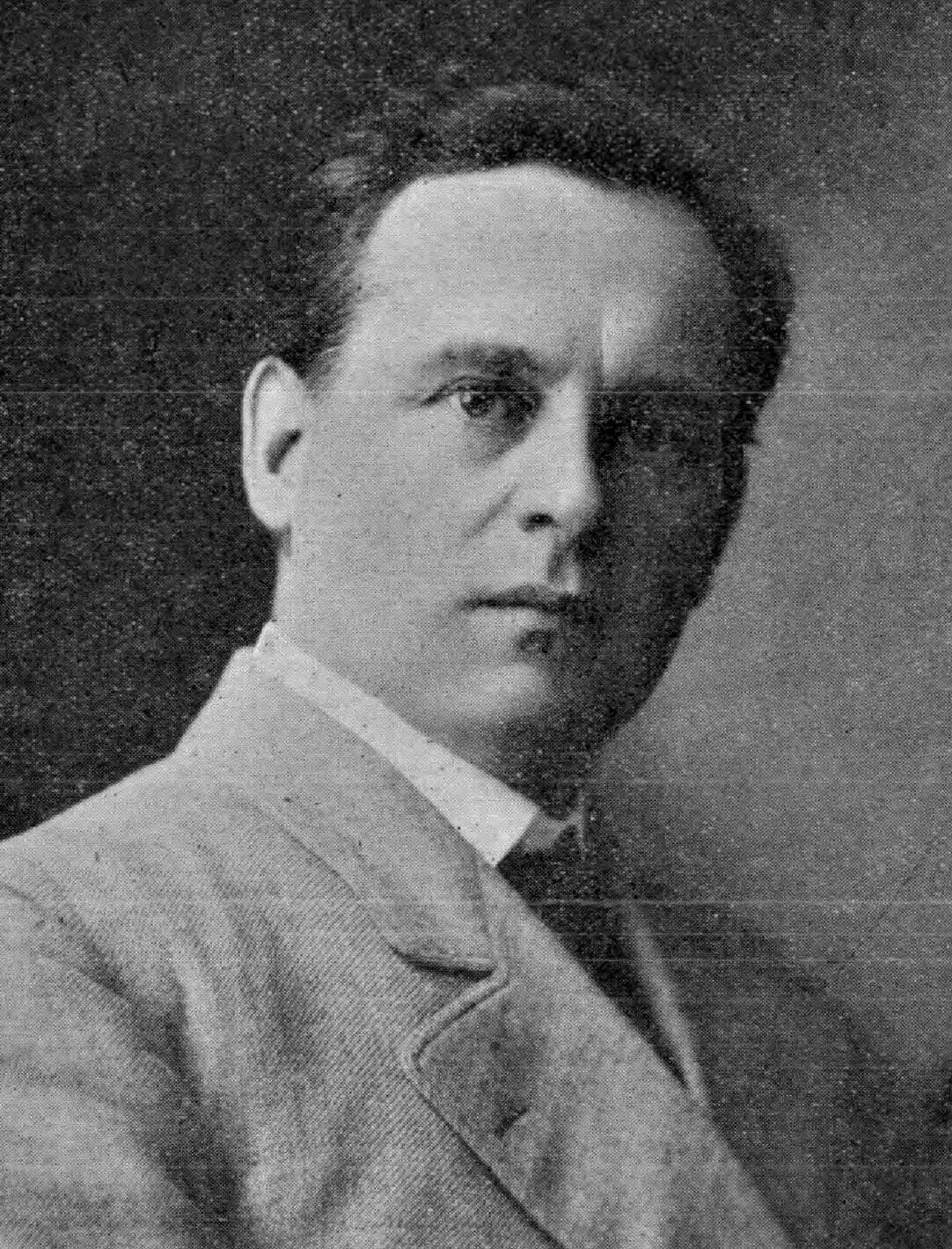
Nominee	James Gillett	Theodore Arlington Bell
Party	Republican	Democratic
Popular vote	125,887	117,645
Percentage	40.35%	37.71%
Nominee	William Langdon	Austin Lewis
Party	Independence	Socialist
Popular vote	45,008	16,036
Percentage	14.43%	5.14%
- County results Gillett: 30–40% 40–50% 50–60% 70–80% Bell: 30–40% 40–50% 50–60% 60–70% 70–80% Langdon: 40–50%
Governor before election
George Pardee
Republican
Elected Governor
James Gillett
Republican

The 1906 California gubernatorial election was held on November 6, 1906. James Gillett won the 1906 election and became the governor of California. This was the first election in which more votes were cast in Los Angeles County than in San Francisco, possibly as a result of the earthquake seven months earlier in San Francisco. (Note: Los Angeles County would ultimately overtake San Francisco in population during the decade of the 1900s, so this was likely to occur at some point around 1910 anyway.)

== Republican nomination ==
A photograph of Republican nominee for Governor James Gillett and other party leaders at the home of Major Frank McLaughlin, published in The San Francisco Call, September 10, 1906. The photograph, with Gillett's hand on the shoulder of San Francisco political boss Abe Ruef, came to be known as "The Shame of California." Left to right: Frederick W. Henshaw, Rudolph Herold, James Wilfred McKinley, George Hatton, James Gillett, Abe Ruef, Frank McLaughlin, Walter F. Parker, Warren R. Porter, Frank Henry Kerrigan, Joseph R. Knowland.

At the time of the election, the governor of California was George Pardee. In his term, he became a strong proponent of conservation, and provided assistance to the residents of San Francisco when the city experienced a plague from 1900 to 1904, and an earthquake in 1906. This, along with his efficient use of the state's bureaucracy, made him a popular figure. Despite this, Pardee's chances for renomination were slim for several reasons. As with most incumbent governors of the era, there was not enough patronage for all of the groups that had supported him four years earlier, and as a result he could not rely on their support. Many in the Republican Party, as well as the lobbyists for the Southern Pacific Railroad company, also condemned Pardee for his opposition to the company at a time when it was influential in state politics. There were further theories that Republican voters were angry at his focus on issues in Northern California, supposedly neglecting Southern Californians. An alliance between Southern Pacific boss William F. Herrin and San Francisco Republican and Union Labor Party boss Abe Ruef ensured Pardee lost the nomination to James Gillett at the Republican convention in Santa Cruz.

== Democratic nomination ==
The 1902 California gubernatorial election was a close race that saw Democratic candidate Franklin Knight Lane lose the popular vote by only several thousand votes; an impressive feat given the Republican Party's dominance in state politics. Despite this, Lane did not run for the party's nomination in 1906, instead becoming a member of the Interstate Commerce Commission. Candidates considering runs at the beginning of the race were Theodore A. Bell, Meredith P. Snyder, and James Phelan, the former mayor of San Francisco. Bell initially had wanted to run for his former seat in California's 2nd congressional district, instead of for governor. At the Democratic convention in Sacramento the names presented for governor were Phelan, Bell, Thomas O. Toland, and Daniel Cole, among others. Bell would eventually be nominated by the Democrats on September 12, 1906. At the convention the party adopted several wide-ranging policies including support for William Jennings Bryan, public ownership of utilities, support for antitrust legislation, maintaining the Chinese Exclusion Act, support for an 8-hour work day and women's suffrage.

== Third party campaigns ==
The Independence Party began in 1906, largely led by William Randolph Hearst and his supporters. The party held its first state convention in Oakland on September 6, 1906. It was there that it nominated San Francisco District Attorney William Langdon for governor. The party's platform was similar to the Democratic platform, in that they called for the direct election of senators, increased irrigation for farmers, maintaining the Chinese Exclusion Act, food safety laws, and public ownership of utilities.

The Socialist Party was active in California and held its convention in Oakland. It was there that the party nominated Austin Lewis for governor, and F.J. Wheat of Los Angeles for lieutenant governor. Lewis was a lecturer, writer and attorney who had law offices in both San Francisco and Oakland. (Note: He would become known for his work trying to prove the innocence of Tom Mooney and Warren K. Billings in the 1916 Preparedness Day Bombing.) He was a critic of both Gillett and Langdon, going so far as to say that "If you vote for Gillett your ballot counts one for the Southern Pacific railroad machine; if you vote for Hearst's puppet candidate you vote for nothing."

Carl Browne, a former leader in the Workingmen's Party of California and Coxey's Army, attempted to form a political coalition between the Populist and Prohibition Parties with himself as their candidate for governor. When this did not work, he pledged his support to Langdon.

== General election campaign ==
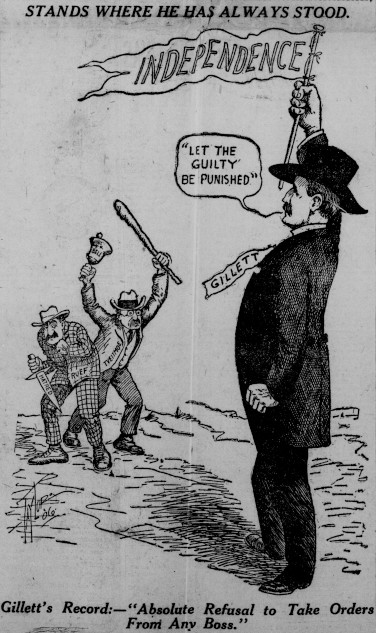
Political cartoon stating that James Gillett is independent of both Southern Pacific lobbyist Abe Ruef and labor leader Olaf Tveitmoe

By October 1906, the candidates had secured the nominations of their parties and started campaigning to voters across the state. Early on Bell would engage in mudslinging, especially against Langdon, whose campaign many at the time saw as a splinter effort of the Democratic Party. On the campaign trail, Bell would criticize Gillett and Langdon. Bell stated that Langdon's campaign was "simply an adjunct of the campaign of James Gillett", and implied that Gillett was a pawn of the Southern Pacific Railroad due to his acceptance of rail passes and lack of action on bills that would hurt the company. Bell also criticized William Randolph Hearst for his efforts to get himself elected Governor of New York and his creation of the Independence League, as many at the time, including Bell, thought this third party would take away votes from the Democrats. On October 10, a prominent Republican banker, W.L. Porterfield, crossed party lines and endorsed Bell, going so far as to promise a subscription of one million dollars towards a new railroad that would connect San Pedro to an Eastern railroad. This showcased the dissatisfaction within the California Republican Party about the Southern Pacific's influence over it.

Governor Pardee endorsed James Gillett on September 28, 1906, allaying fears in the state's Republican Party that Pardee might refuse to endorse Gillett or run a third-party campaign. Gillett held a large campaign rally in Sacramento on October 5. Thousands rallied to support him as he and other Republican leaders gathered to speak about their platform and Gillett's record on issues such as labor. Gillett continued to travel around the state after his major rally, giving talks in Marysville, Grass Valley and Stockton to the working class people of California. In the weeks before the election multiple newspapers across the state were already calling the election for Gillett. Later in the campaign, Gillett was endorsed by President Theodore Roosevelt, who stated in his endorsement, "In my opinion, the Republicans of California are fortunate in the nomination of Mr. Gillett...That if elected, his administration will be a credit to the State I have no doubt." On November 5, the San Francisco Call called the election for Gillett once again, along with other newspapers throughout the state.

== General election results ==
California gubernatorial election, 1906
Party	Candidate	Votes	%	±%
Republican	James Gillett	125,887	40.35%	−7.71%
Democratic	Theodore Arlington Bell	117,645	37.71%	−9.51%
Independence	William Langdon	45,008	14.43%	+14.43%
Socialist	Austin Lewis	16,036	5.14%	+1.99%
Prohibition	James H. Blanchard	7,355	2.36%	+0.83%
	Scattering	44	0.01%	
Majority		8,242	2.64%	
Total votes		311,975	100.00%	
Republican hold		Swing	+1.80%	

=== Results by county ===
County	James N. Gillett Republican		Theodore A. Bell Democratic		William H. Langdon Independence		Austin Lewis Socialist		James H. Blanchard Prohibition		Scattering Write-in		Margin		Total votes cast
County	#	%	#	%	#	%	#	%	#	%	#	%	#	%	Total votes cast
Alameda	11,029	39.66%	6,561	23.59%	7,735	27.82%	1,922	6.91%	561	2.02%	0	0.00%	3,294 (Note: Margin over Langdon)	11.84%	27,808
Alpine	52	76.47%	14	20.59%	2	2.94%	0	0.00%	0	0.00%	0	0.00%	38	55.88%	68
Amador	889	38.35%	1,181	50.95%	211	9.10%	22	0.95%	15	0.65%	0	0.00%	-292	-12.60%	2,318
Butte	2,057	37.91%	2,753	50.74%	289	5.33%	246	4.53%	80	1.47%	1	0.02%	-696	-12.83%	5,426
Calaveras	1,159	44.66%	922	35.53%	402	15.49%	97	3.74%	12	0.46%	3	0.12%	237	9.13%	2,595
Colusa	375	20.76%	1,303	72.15%	64	3.54%	46	2.55%	18	1.00%	0	0.00%	-928	-51.38%	1,806
Contra Costa	2,158	41.70%	1,693	32.71%	1,001	19.34%	286	5.53%	35	0.68%	2	0.04%	465	8.99%	5,175
Del Norte	383	49.36%	302	38.92%	37	4.77%	48	6.19%	6	0.77%	0	0.00%	81	10.44%	776
El Dorado	831	36.18%	1,245	54.20%	99	4.31%	103	4.48%	19	0.83%	0	0.00%	-414	-18.02%	2,297
Fresno	4,082	41.55%	4,642	47.25%	376	3.83%	441	4.49%	281	2.86%	2	0.02%	-560	-5.70%	9,824
Glenn	375	25.92%	992	68.56%	59	4.08%	8	0.55%	13	0.90%	0	0.00%	-617	-42.64%	1,447
Humboldt	3,633	56.30%	2,420	37.50%	94	1.46%	242	3.75%	64	0.99%	0	0.00%	1,213	18.80%	6,453
Inyo	284	30.67%	190	20.52%	387	41.79%	39	4.21%	26	2.81%	0	0.00%	-103	-11.12%	926
Kern	1,484	34.78%	1,878	44.01%	502	11.76%	368	8.62%	35	0.82%	0	0.00%	-394	-9.23%	4,267
Kings	1,056	46.89%	967	42.94%	94	4.17%	86	3.82%	49	2.18%	0	0.00%	89	3.95%	2,252
Lake	492	34.12%	743	51.53%	121	8.39%	65	4.51%	21	1.46%	0	0.00%	-251	-17.41%	1,442
Lassen	391	40.90%	484	50.63%	52	5.44%	26	2.72%	3	0.31%	0	0.00%	-93	-9.73%	956
Los Angeles	20,936	43.86%	12,937	27.10%	8,360	17.51%	3,047	6.38%	2,452	5.14%	5	0.01%	7,999	16.76%	47,737
Madera	626	38.01%	781	47.42%	155	9.41%	60	3.64%	25	1.52%	0	0.00%	-155	-9.41%	1,647
Marin	1,760	46.17%	1,247	32.71%	705	18.49%	84	2.20%	16	0.42%	0	0.00%	513	13.46%	3,812
Mariposa	322	32.23%	454	45.45%	179	17.92%	33	3.30%	11	1.10%	0	0.00%	-132	-13.21%	999
Mendocino	2,114	45.24%	2,028	43.40%	307	6.57%	185	3.96%	38	0.81%	1	0.02%	86	1.84%	4,673
Merced	792	34.71%	1,116	48.90%	261	11.44%	79	3.46%	34	1.49%	0	0.00%	-324	-14.20%	2,282
Modoc	486	40.91%	658	55.39%	22	1.85%	10	0.84%	9	0.76%	3	0.25%	-172	-14.48%	1,188
Mono	193	47.65%	169	41.73%	26	6.42%	17	4.20%	0	0.00%	0	0.00%	24	5.93%	405
Monterey	1,755	40.43%	1,560	35.94%	768	17.69%	97	2.23%	161	3.71%	0	0.00%	195	4.49%	4,341
Napa	1,303	32.06%	2,480	61.02%	140	3.44%	77	1.89%	63	1.55%	1	0.02%	-1,177	-28.96%	4,064
Nevada	1,239	34.12%	1,983	54.61%	255	7.02%	104	2.86%	50	1.38%	0	0.00%	-744	-20.49%	3,631
Orange	2,566	47.38%	1,629	30.08%	544	10.04%	318	5.87%	359	6.63%	0	0.00%	937	17.30%	5,416
Placer	1,255	38.87%	1,729	53.55%	125	3.87%	50	1.55%	68	2.11%	2	0.06%	-474	-14.68%	3,229
Plumas	473	44.37%	493	46.25%	73	6.85%	17	1.59%	9	0.84%	1	0.09%	-20	-1.88%	1,066
Riverside	2,093	48.74%	1,156	26.92%	393	9.15%	377	8.78%	273	6.36%	2	0.05%	937	21.82%	4,294
Sacramento	3,345	30.54%	7,074	64.58%	147	1.34%	328	2.99%	59	0.54%	1	0.01%	-3,729	-34.04%	10,954
San Benito	582	38.80%	635	42.33%	200	13.33%	33	2.20%	50	3.33%	0	0.00%	-53	-3.53%	1,500
San Bernardino	3,165	45.34%	2,080	29.80%	936	13.41%	420	6.02%	379	5.43%	0	0.00%	1,085	15.54%	6,980
San Diego	3,621	46.42%	2,524 (Note: Includes 55 votes from the Union Labor ticket)	32.36%	504	6.46%	974	12.49%	174	2.23%	3	0.04%	1,097	14.06%	7,800
San Francisco	12,903	34.56%	11,650	31.20%	10,523	28.19%	2,103	5.63%	156	0.42%	0	0.00%	1,253	3.36%	37,335
San Joaquin	3,160	42.33%	3,474	46.53%	512	6.86%	204	2.73%	116	1.55%	0	0.00%	-314	-4.21%	7,466
San Luis Obispo	1,574	39.32%	1,683	42.04%	392	9.79%	251	6.27%	101	2.52%	2	0.05%	-109	-2.72%	4,003
San Mateo	1,690	50.57%	863	25.82%	679	20.32%	91	2.72%	18	0.54%	1	0.03%	827	24.75%	3,342
Santa Barbara	1,794	41.49%	1,323	30.60%	920	21.28%	214	4.95%	69	1.60%	4	0.09%	471	10.89%	4,324
Santa Clara	5,714	45.98%	3,805	30.62%	1,978	15.92%	490	3.94%	437	3.52%	4	0.03%	1,909	15.36%	12,428
Santa Cruz	1,696	37.17%	1,760	38.57%	635	13.92%	261	5.72%	209	4.58%	2	0.04%	-64	-1.40%	4,563
Shasta	1,425	39.05%	1,468	40.23%	308	8.44%	372	10.19%	76	2.08%	0	0.00%	-43	-1.18%	3,649
Sierra	459	39.95%	592	51.52%	58	5.05%	38	3.31%	2	0.17%	0	0.00%	-133	-11.58%	1,149
Siskiyou	1,406	40.59%	1,718	49.60%	216	6.24%	108	3.12%	16	0.46%	0	0.00%	-312	-9.01%	3,464
Solano	2,061	36.63%	2,918	51.86%	369	6.56%	213	3.79%	66	1.17%	0	0.00%	-857	-15.23%	5,627
Sonoma	3,687	41.07%	4,346	48.41%	632	7.04%	200	2.23%	112	1.25%	0	0.00%	-659	-7.34%	8,977
Stanislaus	1,197	39.12%	1,350	44.12%	253	8.27%	62	2.03%	197	6.44%	1	0.03%	-153	-5.00%	3,060
Sutter	679	43.06%	807	51.17%	40	2.54%	35	2.22%	15	0.95%	1	0.06%	-128	-8.12%	1,577
Tehama	877	35.36%	1,281	51.65%	117	4.72%	163	6.57%	42	1.69%	0	0.00%	-404	-16.29%	2,480
Trinity	517	47.09%	402	36.61%	100	9.11%	77	7.01%	2	0.18%	0	0.00%	115	10.47%	1,098
Tulare	1,513	30.45%	2,654	53.41%	325	6.54%	377	7.59%	99	1.99%	1	0.02%	-1,141	-22.96%	4,969
Tuolumne	732	32.16%	780	34.27%	616	27.07%	104	4.57%	43	1.89%	1	0.04%	-48	-2.11%	2,276
Ventura	1,449	47.14%	875	28.46%	549	17.86%	152	4.94%	49	1.59%	0	0.00%	574	18.67%	3,074
Yolo	1,305	39.45%	1,782	53.87%	59	1.78%	109	3.30%	53	1.60%	0	0.00%	-477	-14.42%	3,308
Yuba	693	35.50%	1,091	55.89%	102	5.23%	57	2.92%	9	0.46%	0	0.00%	-398	-20.39%	1,952
Total	125,887	40.35%	117,645	37.71%	45,008	14.43%	16,036	5.14%	7,355	2.36%	44	0.01%	8,242	2.64%	311,975

==== Counties that flipped from Democratic to Republican ====
- Kings
- Mendocino
- Monterey
- San Francisco
- Trinity

==== Counties that flipped from Republican to Democratic ====
- Amador
- Butte
- Lassen
- Napa
- Nevada
- Placer
- Plumas
- Sierra
- Sonoma
- Sutter
- Yuba

==== Counties that flipped from Republican to Independence ====
- Inyo
