= Austin Lewis (socialist) =

American socialist author, lawyer, and politician (1865–1944)

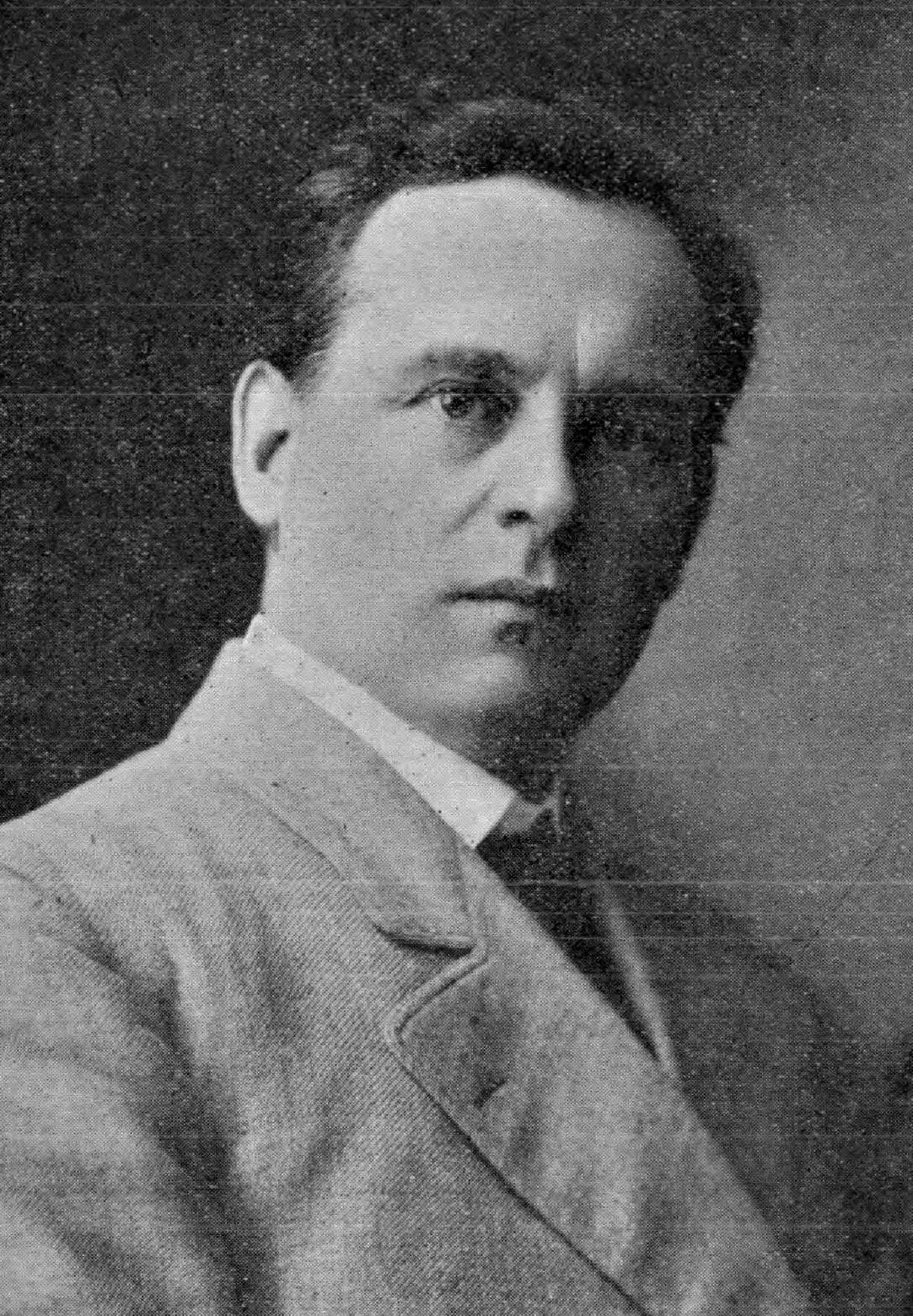
Austin Lewis

Austin M. Lewis (April 7, 1865 – June 26, 1944) was an English-born socialist author, translator, labor lawyer, and politician. After emigrating to Northern California in 1890, he became active in socialist causes. He created the first English translations of works by Friedrich Engels. Among his own books, the best known was The Militant Proletariat (1911). He ran on the Socialist Party ticket for California governor in 1906, and for the U.S. House of Representatives in 1910. As a lawyer, he sought pardons for Thomas Mooney and Warren K. Billings, and defended members of the IWW. He helped found the Northern California affiliate of the American Civil Liberties Union (ACLU).

== Biography ==
Austin Lewis was born into a Jewish family in Garston, Lancashire, England in 1865. His father was a schoolmaster. Austin attended the University of London where he obtained a bachelor's degree and law degree. As a student, he was influenced by the writings of English socialist William Morris.

In 1890, Lewis emigrated to California and settled in the Bay Area. His first job was teaching Classics at the Tamalpais Military Academy in San Rafael, where he remained until 1898. That year he passed the California Bar Examination. From 1900 to 1906, he contributed occasional articles to the San Francisco Examiner and other newspapers, mostly on science and research topics.

By 1906, Lewis was living in East Oakland and was active in the newly formed Socialist Party of America (SPA). He had earned name recognition throughout the state from his writing and lecturing. In the 1906 California gubernatorial election, he ran as the Socialist candidate and garnered 5.1% of the vote. He ran again on the Socialist ticket in the 1910 U.S. House elections—he was vying to represent California's 4th congressional district—and finished in third place with 6.5%.

At the start of the 20th century, Lewis was a prolific writer. He authored books such as The Church and Socialism (1906), The Rise of the American Proletarian (1907), and The Militant Proletariat (1911). He also created the first English translations of works by Friedrich Engels and Karl Kautsky. Historian Allen Ruff said of The Militant Proletariat that Lewis:

strove to produce a sound, rigorous Marxian analysis of contemporary conditions in order to bolster the left's argument for industrial unionism. Released in December 1911, The Militant Proletariat went further than any other book of the period to elucidate the reasons for the rise and the rational necessity for that new unionism capable of transcending the narrow confines of conservative, outmoded craft unions.

Lewis's support for industrial unionism put him in the left-wing faction of the SPA. In May 1911 he joined with like-minded San Francisco socialists William McDevitt, Nathan Greist, and Cloudseley Johns to launch a weekly newspaper called Revolt: The Voice of the Militant Worker. Lewis was one of the paper's editors and a frequent article writer who articulated a revolutionary left viewpoint, which was increasingly in conflict with SPA's direction. Revolt ceased publication in May 1912 due to lack of funds. When Bill Haywood was ousted from SPA in 1913 for advocating a militant "direct action" approach by labor, Lewis sided with Haywood and resigned from SPA as well.

During these years, Lewis was a regular contributor of magazine articles. His work was often printed in Charles H. Kerr's publication, International Socialist Review. From 1913 to 1916, Lewis wrote for New Review magazine and sat on its Advisory Council. He served as editor of Class Struggle magazine (1917–19) when it took a pro-Bolshevik position in the wake of the Russian Revolution.

In his capacity as a lawyer, Lewis defended trade unionists, labor organizations, and fought government injunctions. In one of his high-profile cases, he defended IWW leaders Richard Ford and Herman Suhr in the Wheatland Hop Riot trial. For many years, Lewis was the lawyer for Thomas Mooney and Warren K. Billings, and worked to exonerate the two men from wrongful conviction in the 1916 Preparedness Day bombing.

In 1926, Lewis formed a Northern California affiliate of the American Civil Liberties Union. The new affiliate did not last, but Lewis tried again in 1934 and was able to establish it on a permanent basis.

== Death ==
Austin Lewis died at his home in Oakland on June 26, 1944. He was 79. He was survived by his wife Ethel C. Lewis, who had been active in the women's suffrage movement, and their four children.

== Works ==
=== Books ===
- The Church and Socialism. Workers' world series.no. 1. Oakland: The World Press. 1906.
- The Rise of the American Proletarian. International library of science. Chicago: Charles H. Kerr & Co. 1907. LCCN 07014260.
- The Militant Proletariat. Chicago: Charles H. Kerr & Co. 1911. OCLC 2037325.
- Proletarian and Petit-Bourgeois. Chicago: Charles H. Kerr & Co. 1912.

=== Selected articles ===
- "The Church and the Proletarian". International Socialist Review. Vol. 3, no. 8. February 1903. pp. 465–472.
- "The Economic Interpretation of History and the Practical Socialist Movement". International Socialist Review. Vol. 7, no. 10. April 1907. pp. 608–622.
- "Socialism and Education". International Socialist Review. Vol. 9, no. 5. November 1908. pp. 373–379.
- "War in Socialist Party" (PDF). Revolt. January 13, 1912. p. 1.
- "A Positive Platform". International Socialist Review. Vol. 12, no. 10. April 1912. pp. 664–65.
- "Syndicalism and Mass Action" (PDF). New Review. Vol. I, no. 17. June 1913. pp. 568–579.
- "Organization of the Unskilled (Part 1)" (PDF). New Review. Vol. I, no. 22. November 1913. pp. 873–882.
- "Organization of the Unskilled (Part 2)" (PDF). New Review. Vol. I, no. 23. December 1913. pp. 956–963.
- "Movements of Migratory Unskilled Labor in California". New Review. Vol. II, no. 8. August 1914. pp. 458–465.
- "Solidarity and Unemployment". International Socialist Review. Vol. 15, no. 11. May 1915. pp. 652–655.
- "Solidarity—Merely a Word?" (PDF). New Review. Vol. III, no. 10. July 1915. pp. 125–129.
- "The A. F. of L. Convention" (PDF). New Review. Vol. IV, no. 1. January 1916. pp. 5–7.
- "The Way of the Law with the Worker" (PDF). New Review. Vol. IV, no. 3. March 1916. pp. 72–74.
- "War and Public Opinion". The Class Struggle. Vol. 1, no. 2. July–August 1917. pp. 9–16.
- "The New Labor Movement of the West". The Class Struggle. Vol. 1, no. 3. September–October 1917. pp. 1–10.

=== Translations ===
- Feuerbach: The Roots of the Socialist Philosophy (1903) by Friedrich Engels. LCCN 2025-294969. First English translation of Ludwig Feuerbach und der Ausgang der klassischen deutschen Philosophie (Ludwig Feuerbach and the End of Classical German Philosophy).
- Landmarks of Scientific Socialism (1907) by Friedrich Engels. OCLC 2025381. First complete English translation of Anti-Duhring. A section of the book, titled Socialism: Utopian and Scientific, had been translated by Edward Aveling in 1892.
- The High Cost of Living: Changes in Gold-Production and the Rise in Prices (1914) by Karl Kautsky. LCCN 13-26141.
