= Wickersham Commission =

American governmental committee

National Commission on Law Observance and Enforcement

History
- Established by: Herbert Hoover on 20 May 1929

Membership
- Chairperson: George W. Wickersham
- Other committee members: Newton D. Baker, Roscoe Pound, Ada Comstock, Frank J. Loesch, William S. Kenyon, Paul J. McCormick, William I. Grubb, Kenneth Mackintosh, Henry W. Anderson, Monte M. Lemann

Jurisdiction
- Purpose: To conduct a comprehensive, objective study of the U.S. criminal justice system, evaluate the enforcement of Prohibition, and investigate police corruption and lawlessness.

Summary
- Published a 14-volume report in 1931 revealing widespread systemic corruption, recommending police professionalization, exposing the abusive "third degree" interrogation tactics, and concluding that the enforcement of Prohibition was largely ineffective.

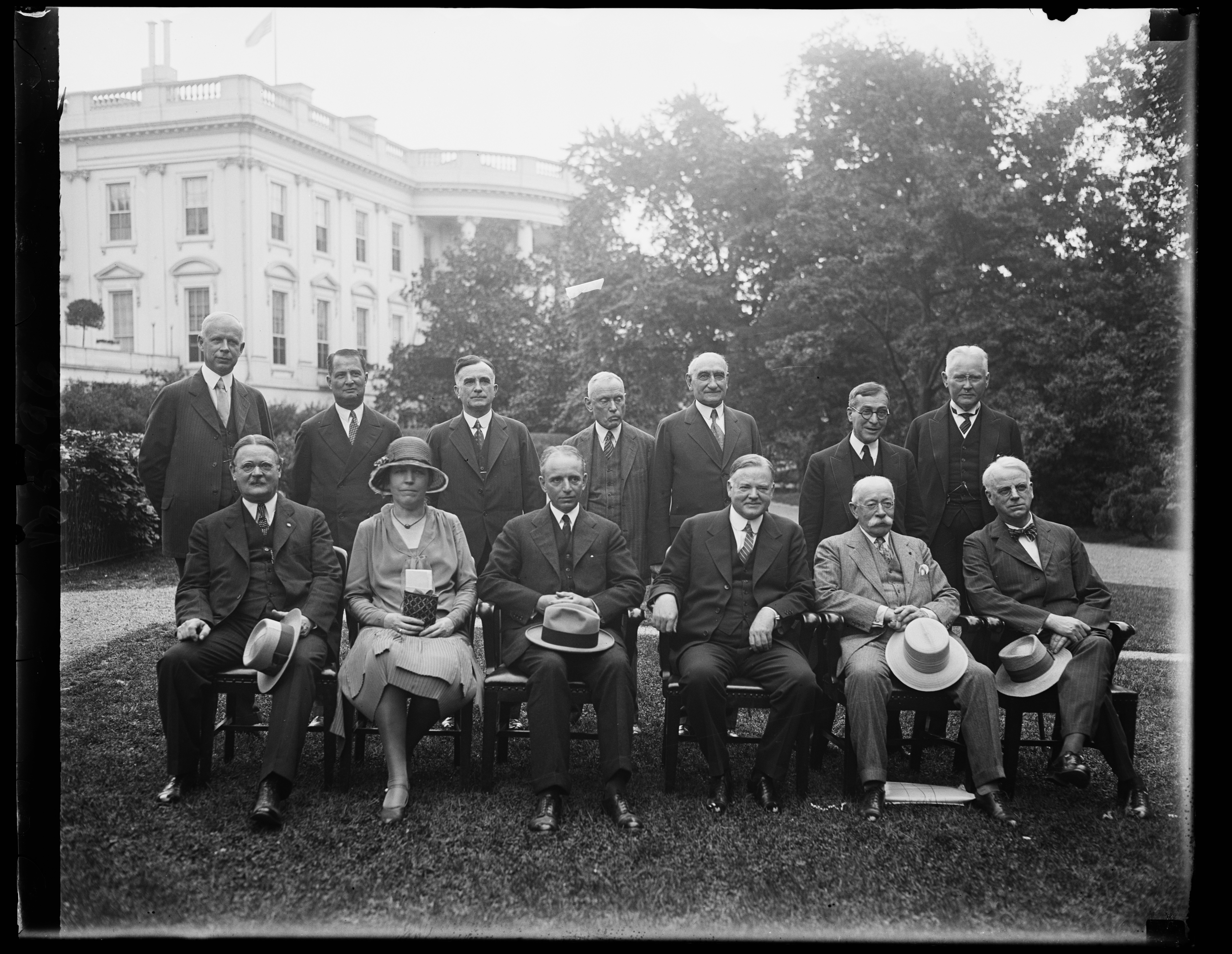
President Herbert Hoover's newly created United States law enforcement and observance commission (circa. 1920)

The National Commission on Law Observance and Enforcement (also known unofficially as the Wickersham Commission) was a committee established by the U.S. president, Herbert Hoover, on May 20, 1929. Former attorney general George W. Wickersham (1858–1936) chaired the 11-member group, which was charged with investigating the causes and costs of crime, Prohibition enforcement, policing, courts and antiquated criminal procedures, and prisons, parole and probation practices, among other topics in order to improve the American criminal justice system.

During the 1928 presidential campaign Herbert Hoover supported the Eighteenth Amendment to the United States Constitution (which had introduced nationwide alcohol prohibition) but he recognized that evasion of the law was widespread and that prohibition had fueled the growth of organized crime.

== Membership ==
Commission members included Henry W. Anderson, Newton D. Baker, Ada Comstock, William Irwin Grubb, William S. Kenyon, Monte M. Lemann, Frank J. Loesch, Kenneth Mackintosh, Paul John McCormick, and Dean Roscoe Pound of the Harvard Law School. Pioneering American criminologist August Vollmer wrote portions of the report.

From 1929 to 1930, Alger Hiss worked in legal research for the general counsel of the "Wickersham Committee" (as William L. Marbury, Jr. described it in a 1935 letter, in which he sought the support of U.S. Senator George L. P. Radcliffe for the appointment of Alger Hiss to the U.S. Solicitor General's office).

== Findings ==
The Commission focused its investigations almost entirely on the widespread violations of the national alcohol prohibition to study and recommend changes to the Eighteenth Amendment and to observe police practices in the states. They observed police interrogation tactics and reported that "the inflicting of pain, physical or mental, to extract confessions or statements... is widespread throughout the country." They released a second report in 1931 that supported Prohibition but found contempt among average Americans and unworkable enforcement across the states, corruption in police ranks, local politics and problems in every community that attempted to enforce prohibition laws.

August Vollmer was the primary author of the commission's final report, commonly known as the Wickersham Report, which was released on January 7, 1931. It documented the widespread evasion of Prohibition and its negative effects on American society and recommended much more aggressive and extensive law enforcement to enforce compliance with anti-alcohol laws. The report castigated the police for their "general failure... to detect and arrest criminals guilty of the many murders, spectacular bank, payroll and other holdups and sensational robberies with guns." Monte M. Lemann was the only commission member who refused to sign the report, issuing a separate opinion, where he concluded that there was "no alternative but repeal of the [Eighteenth] Amendment."

== Criticism ==
Franklin P. Adams, a columnist for the New York World, summarized his opinion of the commission's report with this poem:

Prohibition is an awful flop.
We like it.
It can't stop what it's meant to stop.
We like it.
It's left a trail of graft and slime
It don't prohibit worth a dime
It's filled our land with vice and crime,
Nevertheless, we're for it.

In the November 1931 issue of the New Masses, graphic artist Jacob Burck published the cartoon "I-I B-b-eg Your Pardon..." depicting a mortified Wickersham, holding his Wickersham report, while he looks on as a capitalist violates liberty.

== See also ==
- Bureau of Prohibition
- Preparedness Day Bombing
- Thomas Mooney
- Warren K Billings
- Edwin Atherton
- Emma A. Winslow

== Commission Reports Historical Bibliography ==
- "Enforcement of the Prohibition Laws: Official Records of the National Commission on Law Observance and Enforcement Vol. I". 71st Cong., 3d sess. Senate. Doc. ;307. Washington, D.C.: U.S. Government Printing Office. 1931. hdl:2027/mdp.35112104689981.
- "Enforcement of the Prohibition Laws: Official Records of the National Commission on Law Observance and Enforcement Vol. II". 71st Cong., 3d sess. Senate. Doc. ;307. Washington, D.C.: U.S. Government Printing Office. 1931. hdl:2027/mdp.35112104689999.
- "Enforcement of the Prohibition Laws: Official Records of the National Commission on Law Observance and Enforcement Vol. III". 71st Cong., 3d sess. Senate. Doc. ;307. Washington, D.C.: U.S. Government Printing Office. 1931. hdl:2027/mdp.35112104687001.
- "Enforcement of the Prohibition Laws: Official Records of the National Commission on Law Observance and Enforcement Vol. IV". 71st Cong., 3d sess. Senate. Doc. ;307. Washington, D.C.: U.S. Government Printing Office. 1931. hdl:2027/mdp.35112104687019.
- "Enforcement of the Prohibition Laws: Official Records of the National Commission on Law Observance and Enforcement Vol. V". 71st Cong., 3d sess. Senate. Doc. ;307. Washington, D.C.: U.S. Government Printing Office. 1931. hdl:2027/mdp.35112104687027.
- United States Wickersham Commission (1968). Complete Reports: Including the Mooney-Billings Report. Montclair, N.J.: Patterson Smith. LCCN 68055277. OCLC 451611.

== Sources ==
- John Vernon, "The Wickersham Commission and William Monroe Trotter" in Negro History Bulletin, 1999 (January–March)
- Marc L. Miller and Ronald F. Wright, Criminal Procedures, Cases, Statutes, and Executive Materials, Second Ed. 2003
- Department of Justice Library: "Report on the Enforcement of the Prohibition Laws of the United States: National Commission on Law Observance and Enforcement"
- "Records of the Wickersham Commission" (PDF). Lexis Nexis. University Publications of America. 1965.
- Boyer, Paul S. The Enduring Vision: A History of the American People. Boston: Houghton Mifflin, 2006. Print.
- Hoover, Herbert C. (May 28, 1929). "Remarks at the First Meeting of the National Commission on Law Observance and Enforcement - May 28, 1929". Internet Archive. Washington, D.C.: National Archives and Records Service. pp. 159–161.
- Hoover, Herbert C. (October 1, 1929). "Statement on the Appointment of John McNab To Study and Formulate Plans for the Improvement of Prohibition Law Enforcement - October 1, 1929". Internet Archive. Washington, D.C.: National Archives and Records Service. pp. 309–310.
- Hoover, Herbert C. (June 27, 1930). "Statement on the National Commission on Law Observance and Enforcement - June 27, 1930". Internet Archive. Washington, D.C.: National Archives and Records Service. pp. 267–268.
- Hoover, Herbert C. (January 20, 1931). "Message to the Congress Transmitting Report of the National Commission on Law Observance and Enforcement - January 20, 1931". HathiTrust. Washington, D.C.: National Archives and Records Service. pp. 27–31.
