= Cooper Hewitt =

Cooper Hewitt may refer to:

- Peter Cooper Hewitt (1861–1921), American electrical engineer, inventor of the mercury-vapor discharge lamp
- Cooper Hewitt, Smithsonian Design Museum, a museum of the Smithsonian Institution dedicated to design
