= Charles Fickert =

American lawyer, politician, and football player and coach

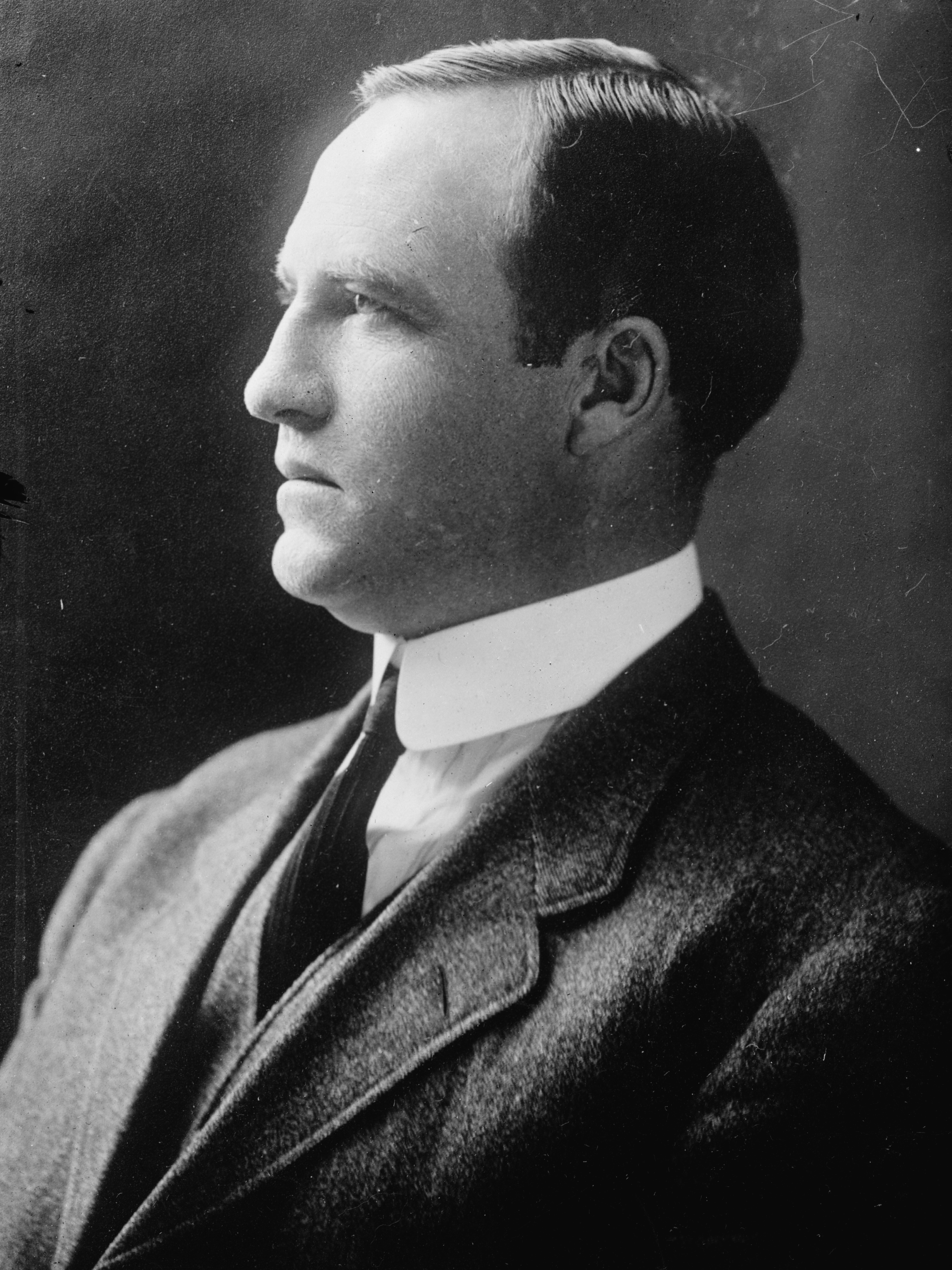
- Fickert c. 1911

19th District Attorney of San Francisco
- In office January 8, 1910 – January 8, 1920
- Preceded by: William H. Langdon
- Succeeded by: Matthew Brady

Personal details
- Born: February 23, 1873 Kern County, California, U.S.
- Died: October 19, 1937 (aged 64) San Francisco, California, U.S.
- Party: Republican; Union Labor
- Spouse: Ethel Wallace (m. 1905; div. 1935)
- Children: 3
- Education: Stanford University
- Coaching career

Playing career
- 1894–1898: Stanford
- Position: Guard

Coaching career (HC unless noted)
- 1901: Stanford

Head coaching record
- Overall: 3–2–2
- Bowls: 0–1

Charles Marron Fickert (February 23, 1873 – October 19, 1937) was an American lawyer, politician, and college football player and coach. He served as district attorney of San Francisco from 1909 to 1920, best known for prosecuting Thomas Mooney and Warren Billings for the Preparedness Day bombing of 1916.

== College and football career ==
Born in Kern County, California, Fickert entered Stanford University in 1894, where he studied law and played guard on the university's football team. In 1901, Fickert was the first Stanford alumnus to serve as head football coach at his alma mater. He led Stanford to a 3–2–2 record in 1901 and an appearance in the first ever college football bowl game, the 1902 Rose Bowl, where his team lost, 49–0, to the Michigan Wolverines.

=== Head coaching record ===
Year	Team	Overall	Conference	Standing	Bowl/playoffs
Stanford (Independent) (1901)
1901	Stanford	3–2–2			L Rose
Stanford:		3–2–2			
Total:		3–2–2			

== Political career ==
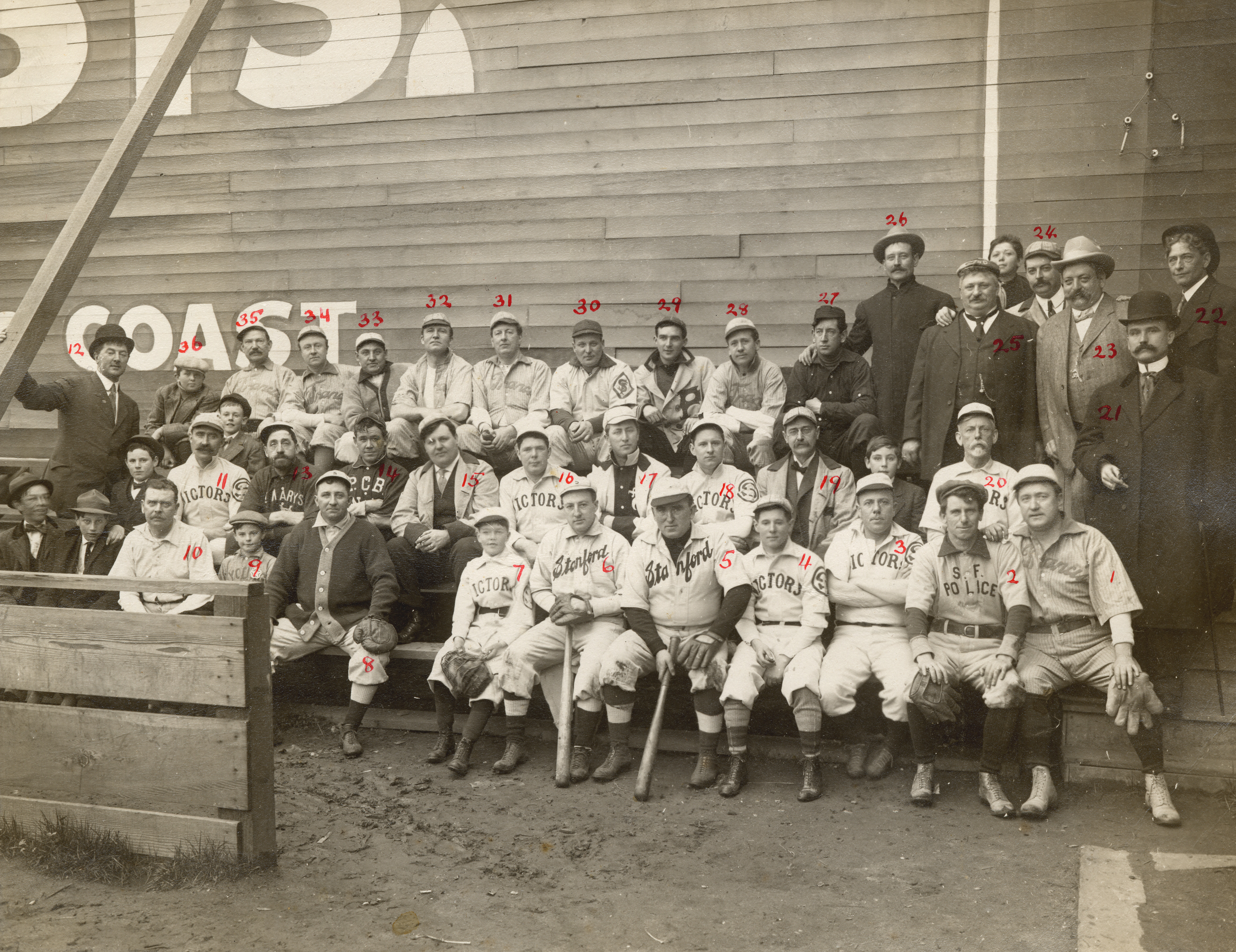
Fickert (back row, #32) as part of a baseball team made up of San Francisco police officers, judges and politicians c. 1915

Admitted to the California Bar in 1895 while in Los Angeles, Fickert arrived in San Francisco and joined the law offices of Edward Robeson Taylor, who later replaced Mayor Eugene E. Schmitz after he was indicted during the graft trials.

Fickert's first public office was assistant United States Attorney, serving for two years. He then ran successfully for district attorney in 1909 on a Republican-Union Labor ticket, defeating special prosecutor for the DA's office Francis J. Heney. Fickert was regularly reelected until 1920, when he was defeated by Matthew Brady. In 1918, Fickert ran for the Republican nomination for Governor of California, but was defeated by incumbent William Stephens.

Fickert drew national attention and scandal in 1916 for his prosecution of labor leaders Thomas Mooney and Warren K. Billings following the Preparedness Day bombing. Witnesses claimed Fickert coached them to perjure themselves in subsequent hearings in order to defend the original convictions.

A 1919 grand jury exonerated Fickert from charges made by John B. Densmore, investigator from Washington, Director General of Employment, in the framing of Mooney and Billings and for his having conspired with Pete McDonough in the freeing of wealthy defendants. President Theodore Roosevelt declared, "anyone assailing Fickert for prosecuting anarchists should be deprived of citizenship".

Fickert continued his battles with his fists, first against Heney at the Olympic Club, then against socialist trade unionist Selig Schulberg at the Hall of Justice, and later against editor Fremont Older at the Palace Hotel.

== Later life and death ==
Fickert's wife, Ethel Wallace Fickert, was granted a divorce from him in 1935, citing excessive drinking and gambling. She was awarded the Fickert home at 1060 Green Street in San Francisco, as well as a $4,000 settlement. Fickert died of pneumonia at Franklin Hospital on October 19, 1937.

== Sources ==
- "Charles Fickert; Convicted Mooney; Prosecutor of San Francisco Preparedness Day Bombing Case Dies of Pneumonia". The New York Times. October 21, 1937. p. 23.
- "C. M. Fickert, Prosecutor of Mooney, Dies". San Francisco Chronicle. October 20, 1937. p. 1 col. 4.
- "Death Takes C. M. Fickert". San Francisco Chronicle. October 20, 1937. p. 13 col. 1.
- "Charles Marron Fickert Weds Miss Ethel Wallace". The San Francisco Call. March 2, 1905. p. 16 col. 4.
