= Ludwig Feuerbach and the End of Classical German Philosophy =

1888 book by Friedrich Engels

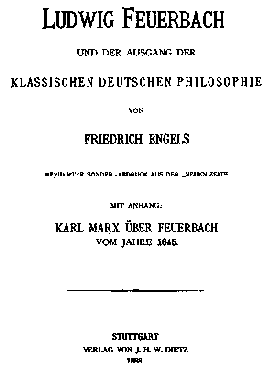
Title page

Ludwig Feuerbach and the End of Classical German Philosophy (German: Ludwig Feuerbach und der Ausgang der klassischen deutschen Philosophie) is a short book by Friedrich Engels. It was first serialized in a socialist journal in 1886, and then published in book form in 1888. In this work, Engels explains how the philosophical contributions of Georg Wilhelm Friedrich Hegel and Ludwig Feuerbach led to Karl Marx and him developing the theory of dialectical materialism.

== Background ==
According to Engels, the immediate impetus for the book was a request in 1885 (two years after Marx's death) by the editors of the German socialist journal Die Neue Zeit. They asked him to review a new book on Ludwig Feuerbach by Danish philosopher Carl Starcke. Engels welcomed the assignment as a chance to write an analysis of the philosophy of Hegel and Feuerbach. The resulting document, which was essentially an extended essay, was published in issues 4 and 5 of Die Neue Zeit in 1886.

In an 1888 foreword to the first book edition, Engels stated that the seed for Ludwig Feuerbach was planted over 40 years earlier when he and Marx were collaborating on "a criticism of post-Hegelian philosophy" (this work was unpublished in their lifetime; it finally appeared in 1932 as The German Ideology). Since Marx had died without their returning to Feuerbach's role as a link between Hegel's philosophy and their own dialectical materialism, Engels decided to provide "a short, coherent account of our relation to the Hegelian philosophy... [and] how we separated from it". Of the three major philosophical works that Engels is known for—Anti-Dühring, Dialectics of Nature, and Ludwig Feuerbach—only the last was written after Marx's death.

== Synopsis ==
The book is divided into four parts. They were not given titles by Engels, but one English translation supplied the following titles to encapsulate each part's contents:

1. From Hegel to Feuerbach
2. Idealism and Materialism
3. Feuerbach's Philosophy of Religion and Ethics
4. Dialectical Materialism

In a key passage in Part 1 (which is dedicated to Hegel), Engels describes the revolutionary character of Hegel's dialectical philosophy of constant movement and upward development:

[A]ll successive historical systems are only transitory stages in the endless course of development of human society from the lower to the higher. Each stage is necessary, and therefore justified for the time and conditions to which it owes its origin. But in the face of new, higher conditions which gradually develop in its own womb, it loses vitality and justification. It must give way to a higher stage which will also in its turn decay and perish.

Engels recalls how the "Young Hegelians" (a group to which he and Marx briefly belonged) were caught in a contradiction brought on by Hegel's system of thought: "While materialism conceives nature as the sole reality, nature in the Hegelian system represents merely the 'alienation' of the absolute idea, so to say, a degradation of the idea. At all events, thinking and its thought-product, the idea, is here the primary, nature the derivative, which only exists at all by the condescension of the idea." Engels then tells of the salutary effect of Feuerbach's 1841 book, The Essence of Christianity:

With one blow, it pulverized the contradiction, in that without circumlocutions it placed materialism on the throne again. Nature exists independently of all philosophy. It is the foundation upon which we human beings, ourselves products of nature, have grown up. Nothing exists outside nature and man, and the higher beings our religious fantasies have created are only the fantastic reflection of our own essence. The spell was broken; the "system" was exploded and cast aside, and the contradiction, shown to exist only in our imagination, was dissolved. One must himself have experienced the liberating effect of this book to get an idea of it. Enthusiasm was general; we all became at once Feuerbachians.

Engels begins Part 2 by introducing "the paramount question of the whole of philosophy", namely, which is primary, spirit or nature? He says the answers which philosophers gave to that question "split them into two great camps. Those who asserted the primacy of spirit to nature...comprised the camp of idealism. The others, who regarded nature as primary, belong to the various schools of materialism." He lauds Feuerbach for answering the question in a materialistic way, but adds that Feuerbach's materialism was limited: it was "predominantly mechanical" (which Engels attributes to the level of scientific knowledge at the time Feuerbach was writing), and it did not comprehend the universe as a process, "as matter undergoing uninterrupted historical development".

In Part 3, Engels argues that Feuerbach allowed elements of idealism to creep into his materialistic outlook, especially "in the philosophy of religion and ethics." Feuerbach's assertion that "the periods of humanity are distinguished only by religious changes" is attacked by Engels as false: "Great historical turning-points have been accompanied by religious changes only so far as the three world religions which have existed up to the present – Buddhism, Christianity, and Islam – are concerned." Engels finds Feuerbach's analysis of the evolution of morality to pale in comparison to Hegel's, and that Feuerbach's understanding of man and nature remained abstract and ahistorical.

In Part 4, Engels recounts how the Marxist worldview was formulated. He writes that Marx started with Hegel's "revolutionary side", i.e., the dialectical method. But for Marx, dialectics was no longer "the self-movement of the concept going on from eternity, no one knows where, but at all events independently of any thinking human brain." Instead, borrowing from Feuerbach's materialism, Marx regarded human thoughts:

as images of real things instead of regarding real things as images of this or that stage of the absolute concept. Thus dialectics reduced itself to the science of the general laws of motion, both of the external world and of human thought — two sets of laws which are identical in substance, but differ in their expression in so far as the human mind can apply them consciously, while in nature and also up to now for the most part in human history, these laws assert themselves unconsciously.

Engels emphasizes that as long as people are prevented from consciously controlling the social world, it will resemble the natural world "in that its laws will operate beyond the will of human beings." He then points to three breakthroughs in 19th century science—the discovery of the cell, the transformation of energy, and Darwin's evolution by natural selection—and how they necessitated a new synthesis of philosophy and natural science: "a comprehensive view of the interconnection in nature by means of the facts provided by empirical science itself...in order to arrive at a 'system of nature' sufficient for our time." He concludes with a brief sketch of the Marxist theory of history.

== Publication history ==
After Ludwig Feuerbach und der Ausgang der klassischen deutschen Philosophie was printed in 1886 in Die Neue Zeit, the Stuttgart publishing house of Johann Heinrich Wilhelm Dietz put out a separate book edition in 1888. The combined length of Engels' four-part essay was only 50 pages. The book added a foreword in which Engels explained the origins of the work. He revised some of the text that had appeared in Die Neue Zeit. He also included as an appendix a set of philosophical notes he discovered among Marx's papers. The notes were from 1845 when he and Marx were writing about the influence of Feuerbach. Engels edited the notes into eleven Theses on Feuerbach. The final thesis—"Philosophers have only interpreted the world in various ways; the point however is to change it"—was engraved on Marx's tomb. The 1888 edition, with its revised text and "Theses on Feuerbach" appendix, became the basis for subsequent reprints and translations of Ludwig Feuerbach.

The first Russian translation, by Georgi Plekhanov, was published in 1892 in Geneva by the Emancipation of Labour group in their Library of Modern Socialism series.

The first English translation, done by Austin Lewis, was published by Charles H. Kerr & Co. in 1903. The title was rendered as Feuerbach: The Roots of the Socialist Philosophy. In 1937, C. P. Dutt edited a new English translation for International Publishers under the title, Ludwig Feuerbach and the Outcome of Classical German Philosophy. The 1946 Progress Publishers translation, titled Ludwig Feuerbach and the End of Classical German Philosophy, is the version posted on the Marxists Internet Archive.

== Critical reaction ==
In his philosophical work, Materialism and Empirio-Criticism (1909), Lenin praised the "consistent materialism" that Engels articulated in Ludwig Feuerbach.

In a 1974 journal article, Henry Pachter challenged Engels' assumption in Ludwig Feuerbach as to what constitutes progress and development. After noting that we do not call it "improvement" when there's an increase in disease, crime, or pollution, Pachter wrote:

Marxism assumes that any new conditions, even those yet developing in the old society's "womb" (both Marx and Engels loved this biological metaphor), are necessarily "higher", and that certainly the result of the ensuing conflict leads to a "higher" form. There is one apparent difficulty with such a system. How do we know what is "up"? Are we not simply confusing "late" with "high", and "last" with "best"? To speak of "progress" we must assume a striving for some goal and an end of development that is somehow prescribed in its beginning.
