= Emma A. Winslow =

American home economist

- Born: March 12, 1887; Rutland County, Vermont
- Died: April 9, 1943; Mount Vernon, New York
- Occupation(s): Home economist, researcher, government official

Emma Annie Winslow (March 12, 1887 – April 9, 1943) was an American home economist and researcher. She made statistical studies of welfare topics including nutrition, household budgets, unemployment, and crime, working with various agencies including the United States Department of Agriculture, Wickersham Commission and the United States Children's Bureau.

== Early life and education ==
Winslow was born in Rutland County, Vermont, the daughter of James Dana Winslow and Kate Elizabeth Willard Winslow. She earned a one-year certificate in Household Economics in 1906 from Simmons College. She earned a bachelor's degree from Teachers' College, Columbia University in 1914, and a master's degree in 1916. She completed doctoral studies at the University of London in 1923, with a dissertation titled Budget Studies and the Measurement of Living Costs and Standards.

== Career ==
Winslow wrote a pamphlet, Your Household Budget in Graphic Form: The New Method of Analyzing and Controlling Household Expenditures (1914), while she was teaching home economics at Columbia University. She gave a series of lectures on home economics in Vermont in 1916. While she was working for the New York Charity Organization Society she wrote Budget Planning and Social Casework (1919) Food Values: How Food Meets Body Needs (1921), and Food Values and Body Needs Shown Graphically (1924), the last two being bulletins of the United States Department of Agriculture.

Winslow also co-wrote Purchasing Power of the Consumer: A Statistical Index (1925) with William E. Berridge and Richard E. Flynn. She worked with the Wickersham Commission when she wrote Crime Increases and Decreases in Massachusetts, 1885-1929: Report of a Study (1930), and contributed to the two-volume Report on the Causes of Crime (1931), published by the National Commission on Law Observance and Enforcement.

Winslow was director of social statistics at the United States Children's Bureau when she testified at a Senate hearing on unemployment relief in 1933, and wrote Trends in Different Types of Public and Private Relief in Urban Areas (1937), a report of the United States Department of Labor. At the time of her death in 1943, she was director of the division of records and reporting at United Service Organizations (USO).

== Personal life ==
Winslow died in 1943, aged 56 years, on a train near Mount Vernon, New York. Her grave is in Pittsford, Vermont.
