= Ann Cooper Hewitt =

American heiress and historical figure

External image
- Ann Cooper Hewitt

Ann Cooper Hewitt
- Born: 31 July 1914
- Died: February 11, 1956 (aged 41)

Ann Cooper Hewitt (1914–1956) was a wealthy American heiress who was sterilized against her will in California in 1935. Her case was critical in turning the tide against the growing eugenics movement in the United States prior to World War II.

== Early life ==
Ann was the child of Peter Cooper Hewitt and Marion (a.k.a. Maryon) Jeanne Andrews.

Peter Cooper Hewitt died in 1921. His will left two-thirds of his estate to Ann and one-third to her mother, Marion; however, if Ann died without an heir, her portion of her father's estate would revert to her mother.

== Forced sterilization ==
In 1935, just before Ann's 21st birthday (when she would have attained legal majority), she was hospitalized for appendicitis. Ann's mother told the surgeons at the private hospital where Ann was receiving care that Ann was "feeble minded" and paid them to sterilize her while performing her appendectomy.

After realizing what her physicians and her mother had done, both criminal and civil lawsuits were filed in San Francisco court. Ann Lindsay was a personal nurse for Ann Hewitt. The criminal case was ultimately unsuccessful, since at the time, involuntary sterilization of the "feeble minded" was legal in California. The state Supreme Court declined to reopen the case. In the end, "a lengthy, exhausting trial resulted in the charges being dropped against the doctors and her mother. Ann settled the civil suit for $150,000."

== Legacy ==
The Ann Cooper Hewitt case, which involved court-ordered sterilization, did not directly lead to any specific legislative changes, but increased public awareness and scrutiny of sterilization practices. This novel use of U.S. sterilization laws energized the growing public debate about the ethics of eugenics and potential unintended consequences of laws allowing involuntary sterilization.
