= William Kenyon =

William Kenyon may refer to:

- William C. Kenyon (1898–1953), American football, basketball, and baseball coach at the University of Maine
- William S. Kenyon (Iowa politician) (1869–1933), U.S. Senator from Iowa from 1911 to 1922
- William S. Kenyon (New York politician) (1820–1896), U.S. Representative from New York

== See also ==
- William Kenyon-Slaney (1847–1908), British sportsman, soldier, and politician
