= Peter Cooper Hewitt =

American electrical engineer and inventor

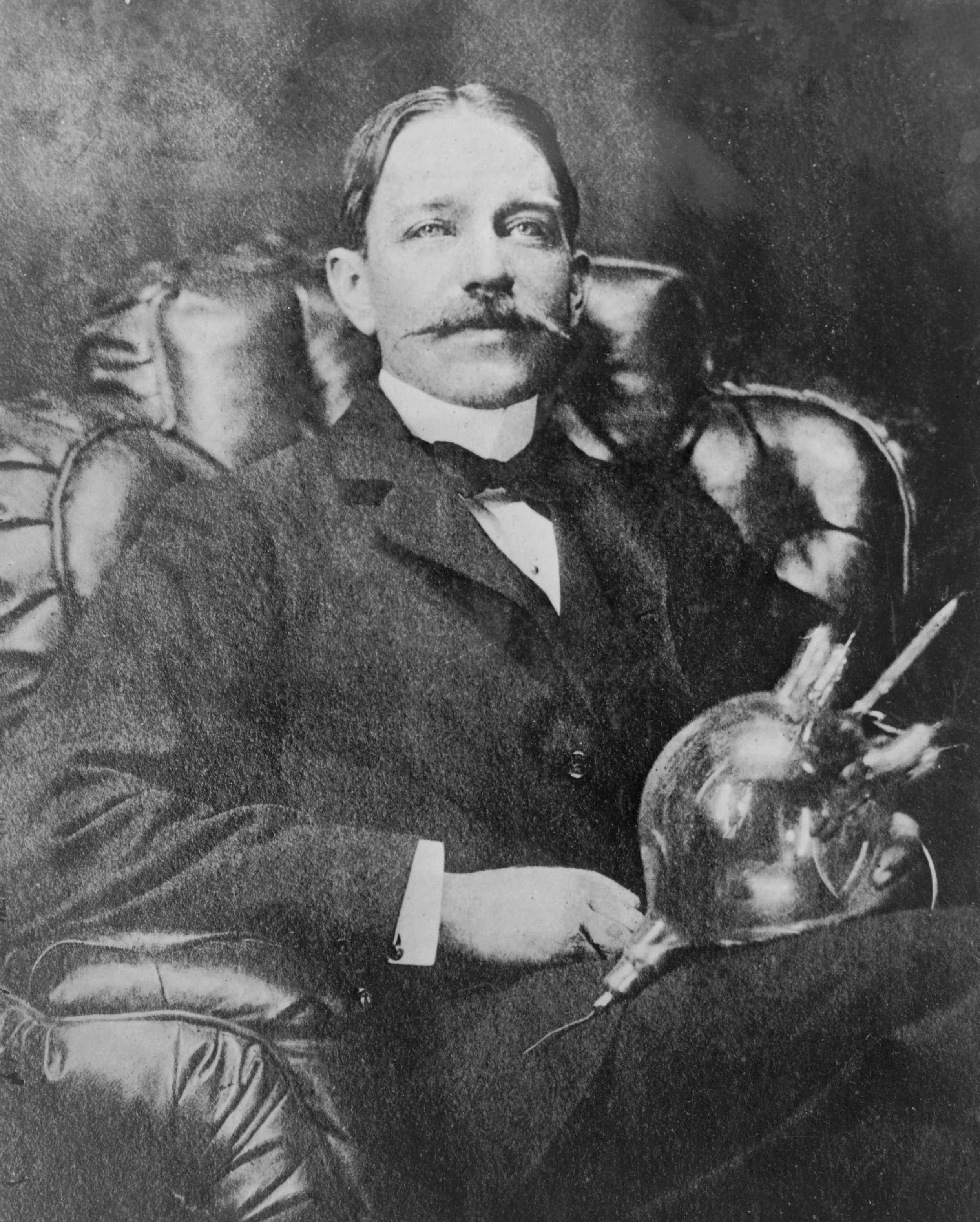
- Peter Cooper Hewitt holding his mercury vapor rectifier
- Born: May 5, 1861; New York City, U.S.
- Died: August 25, 1921 (aged 60); Paris, France
- Burial place: Green-Wood Cemetery, Brooklyn, New York
- Education: Stevens Institute of Technology; Columbia University
- Known for: Arc discharge lamp, mercury-arc valve
- Awards: Elliott Cresson Medal (1910)

Peter Cooper Hewitt (May 5, 1861 – August 25, 1921) was an American electrical engineer and inventor, who invented the first mercury-vapor lamp in 1901. Hewitt was issued U.S. patent 682,692 on September 17, 1901. In 1903, Hewitt created an improved version that possessed higher color qualities which eventually found widespread industrial use.

== Early life ==
Hewitt was born in New York City, the son of New York City Mayor Abram Hewitt and the grandson of industrialist Peter Cooper. He was educated at the Stevens Institute of Technology and the Columbia University School of Mines.

== Career ==
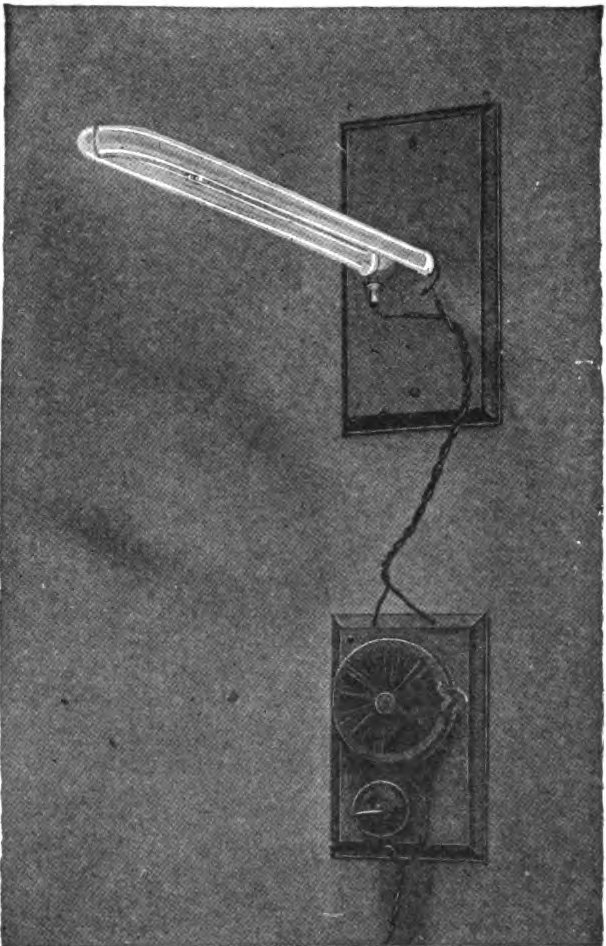
Cooper Hewitt's mercury vapor lamp, the forerunner of the fluorescent lamp

In 1901, Hewitt invented and patented a mercury-vapor lamp that was the forerunner of the fluorescent lamp. A gas-discharge lamp, Hewitt's invention used mercury vapor produced by passing current through liquid mercury. His first lamps had to be started by tilting the tube to make contact between the two electrodes and the liquid mercury; later he developed the inductive electrical ballast to start the tube. The efficiency was much higher than that of incandescent lamps, but the emitted light was of a bluish-green unpleasant color, which limited its practical use to specific professional areas, like photography, where the color was not an issue at a time where films were black and white. For space lighting use, the lamp was frequently augmented by a standard incandescent lamp. The two together provided a more acceptable color while retaining some efficiency advantages.

In 1902, Hewitt developed the mercury arc rectifier, the first rectifier that could convert alternating current power to direct current without mechanical means. It was widely used in electric railways, industry, electroplating, and high-voltage direct current (HVDC) power transmission. Although it was largely replaced by power semiconductor devices in the 1970s and 1980s, it is still used in some high power applications.

In 1903, Columbia University awarded Hewitt the degree of Honorary Doctorate of Science in recognition of his work.

In 1907, he developed and tested an early hydrofoil. In 1916, Hewitt joined Elmer Sperry to develop the Hewitt-Sperry Automatic Airplane, one of the first successful precursors of the cruise missile.

== Personal life ==
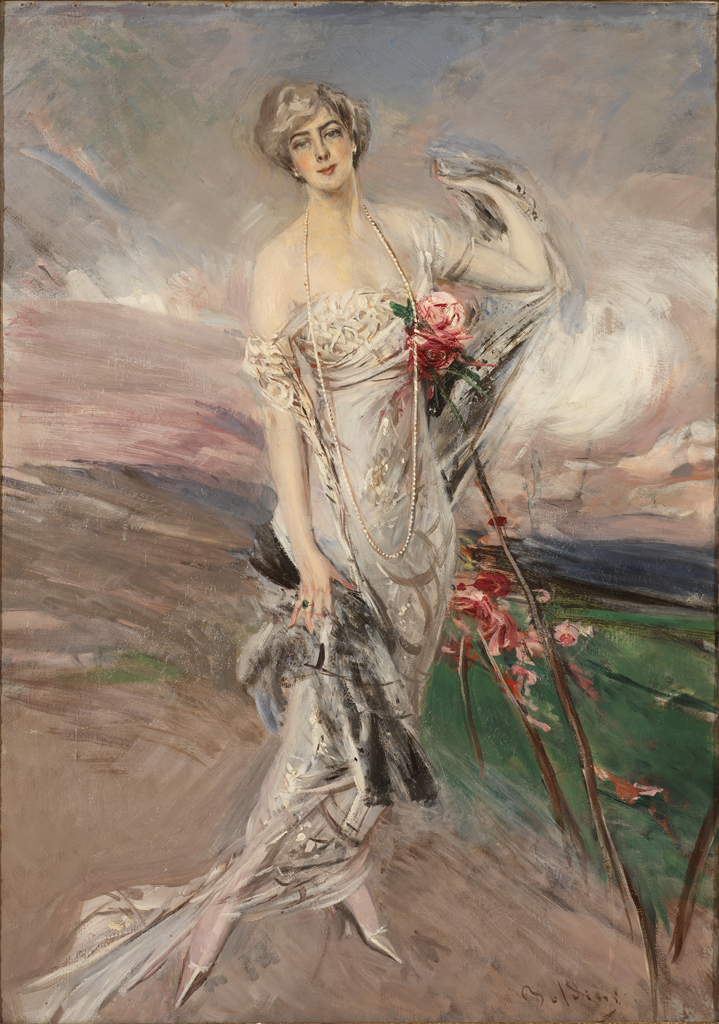
Portrait of Mrs. Peter Cooper Hewitt (1911-13), by Giovanni Boldini.

Hewitt's first wife was Lucy Bond Work. Work was the daughter of Franklin H. Work (1819–1911), a well-known stockbroker and protégé of Cornelius Vanderbilt, and his wife, Ellen Wood (1831–1877), who was the sister of Frances Ellen Work. Thus he was an uncle of Maurice Roche, 4th Baron Fermoy, the maternal grandfather of Diana, Princess of Wales. Cooper Hewitt and his first wife had no children and divorced in December 1918.

While married to Work, Hewitt had an extramarital relationship with Marion (aka Maryon) Jeanne Andrews that resulted in the birth of Ann Cooper Hewitt (July 28, 1914-1956). Hewitt later married Andrews in 1918, right after his divorce to Work, and formally adopted Ann.

External image
- Ann Cooper Hewitt

Prior to Hewitt, Andrews was married in 1902 to Dr. Peder Sather Bruguiere (brother of American photographer Francis Bruguière, brother-in-law of heiress Margaret Post Van Alen and grandson of banker Peder Sather) and in 1907 to wealthy New York broker Alexander Turner Stewart Denning.

After Hewitt, Andrews married in 1922 to Baron Robert Frederic Emile Regis D'Erlanger and in 1926 to George William Childs McCarter (grandson of American author Hannah Mary Bouvier Peterson, great-grandson of Judge John Bouvier and nephew-in-law of American publisher George William Childs).

=== Ann Cooper Hewitt ===
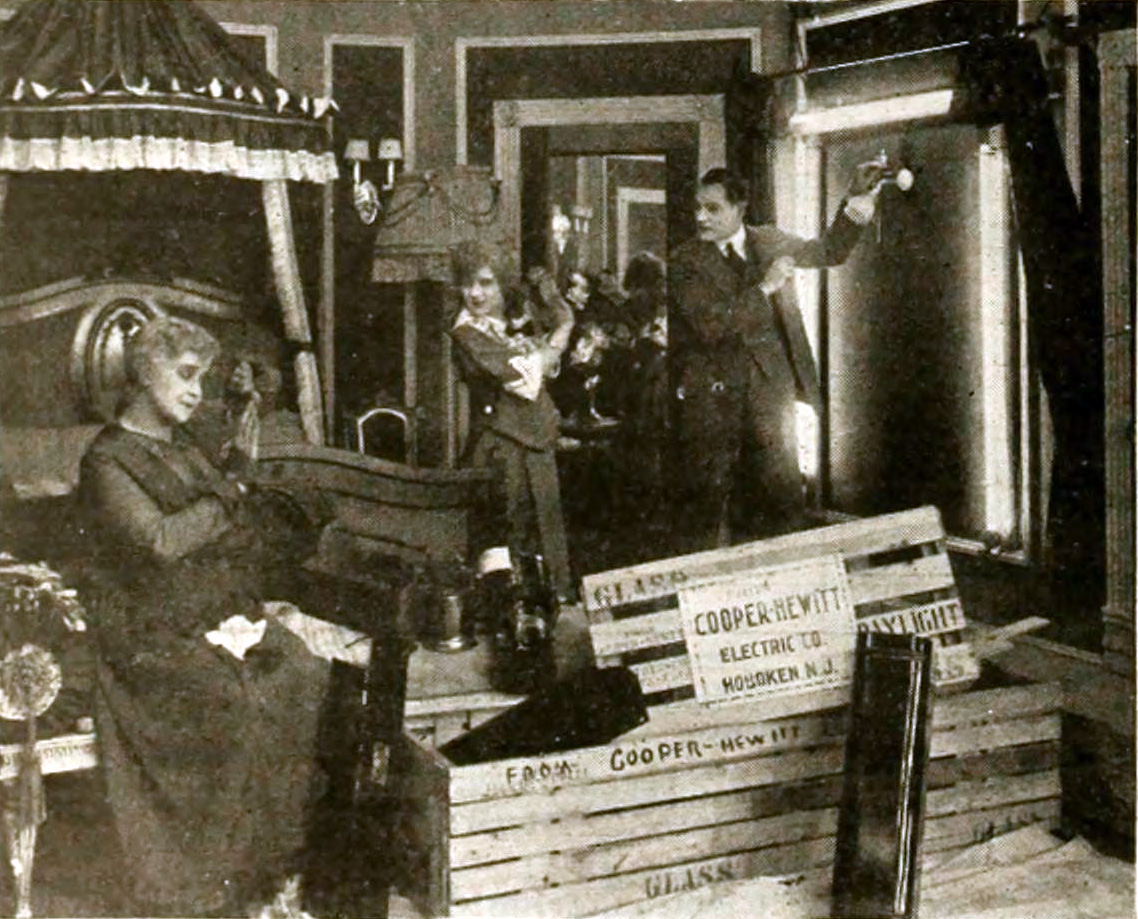
Cooper Hewitt lights used in film production (1916).

Peter Cooper Hewitt died in 1921. His will left two-thirds of his estate to Ann and one-third to her mother Marion; but Ann's portion would revert to her mother if Ann (Gay Bradstreet) died childless.

In 1935, just before Ann's 21st birthday when she would have attained legal majority, she was hospitalized for appendicitis. Ann's mother told the surgeons that Ann was "feebleminded" and paid them to sterilize her while performing her appendectomy. (Note: Attributed to multiple sources.) Ann retaliated by suing her mother in San Francisco court and telling the press about Maryon's gambling and alcohol addictions. The mother-daughter dispute riveted the public; and the unconventional use of sterilization, which occurred in private practice (not a public asylum), forced a public debate of eugenics.
