= Warren Billings =

American labor leader and political activist

Warren K. Billings
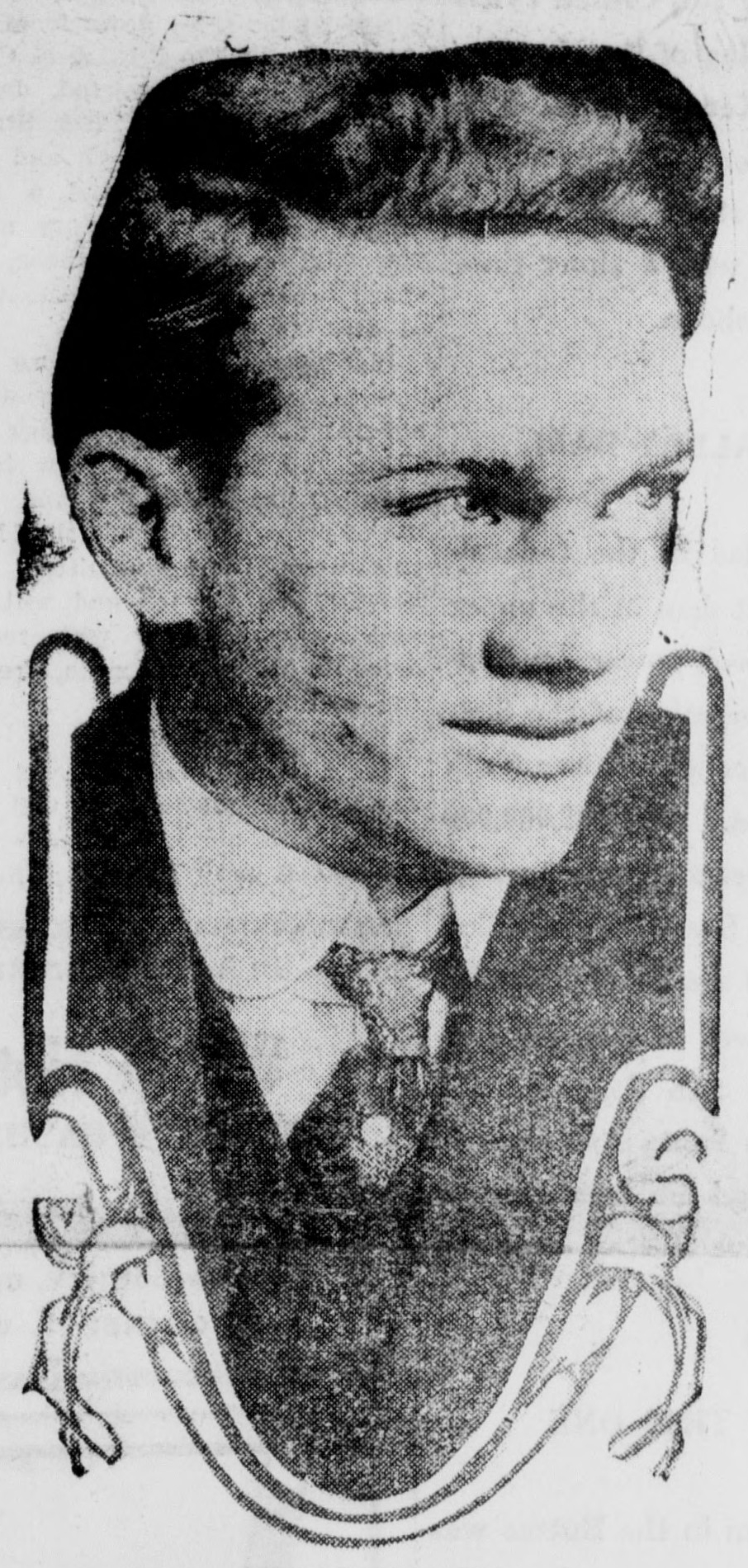
- Billings in 1916
- Born: July 4, 1893; Middletown, New York
- Died: September 4, 1972 (aged 79); Redwood City, California
- Occupations: Labor leader; Political activist; Watchmaker
- Known for: 1916 Preparedness Day bombing
- Spouse: Josephine Rudolph
- Parent: William Billings
- Status: Released in 1939, pardoned in 1961
- Conviction: Second degree murder
- Penalty: Life imprisonment

Details
- Date apprehended: July 26, 1916
- Imprisoned at: Folsom State Prison

Warren Knox Billings (July 4, 1893 – September 4, 1972) was a labor leader and political activist, who was convicted with Thomas Mooney of the San Francisco Preparedness Day Bombing of 1916. It is believed that the two were wrongly convicted of a crime they did not commit. Billings served 23 years in prison before being released in 1939 and finally being pardoned in 1961 by governor Edmund G. Brown.

== Biography ==
=== Early life ===
Billings was born in Middletown, New York on July 4, 1893. His mother was of German ancestry and his father, William Billings, was born in Massachusetts. William Billings died in 1895, he left his wife and nine children without financial backing. Warren Billings moved in with his older sister whose husband would make Warren work until exhaustion, Warren would protest against the unfair treatment. After graduating in 1908 from public school, he went off and worked at a variety of jobs. In 1911 he was convicted and given a suspended sentence for possession of burglar's tools.

=== Suspected dynamiter ===
In March 1913, Billings went to an employment agency for work. He was told there was an opening for a shoe liner at a shoe company that was on strike. He replied that he was no strikebreaker. This is when he was approached by a man outside the employment office who showed him a red card of the Industrial Workers of the World (IWW). He was invited to be a spy for IWW and accepted. He would work in the factory to figure out how many shoes they were making. In this organization he met Thomas Mooney, who became his trusted advisor.

Billings was convicted and imprisoned for one year on a charge of possession of dynamite for the Pacific Gas & Electric strike in 1913. He was found with 60 sticks of dynamite, but testified that he was just ordered to bring a suitcase to a location but had no idea what was in it.

His association with Mooney, who was a well known socialist and militant, strengthened the prosecution's connection between Billings and the Preparedness Day bombing, which took place on July 22, 1916, in San Francisco. The bomb exploded at Steuart and Market Street, killing ten and wounding forty. In the days leading up to the bombing, detective Swanson offered reward money to Billings in exchange for evidence that would convict Thomas Mooney, but Billings then let Mooney know about the plots against him. The bombing took place during the height of anarchist violence in the United States by the Galleanist anarcho-communist movement of Luigi Galleani.

=== Trial ===
Billings was arrested along with Thomas Mooney and his wife Rena and a driver named Israel Weinberg. The trials of both Warren and Mooney were being followed extensively and it is alleged that the witnesses were coached by detective Swanson and by the prosecutors, D.A. Charles Fickert and deputy D.A. Eddie Cunha. Billings and Mooney were convicted, Billings of second degree murder and Mooney of first degree murder. Billings was sentenced to life in prison and Mooney was sentenced to death. Shortly after, the socialist party tried to expel Mooney and Billings. There was worldwide outrage and US President Woodrow Wilson got involved and asked California Governor William Stephens to step in and reduce their sentence to life imprisonment, or at least stay the impending execution. Later, in 1926 a Committee for Pardon was organized for him.

=== In prison ===
In 1918, Mooney's sentence was changed to life imprisonment. Billings was active in prison as an assistant foreman in the prison shoe factory. He studied law and Latin. His studies in law would allow him to assist lawyers after his release. He also was in constant contact with a woman named Josephine Rudolph. He later married her in 1940. Mooney was let out of prison first and was pardoned. There were tensions between Mooney and Billings over money for Billings's pardon committee.

=== Release and later years ===
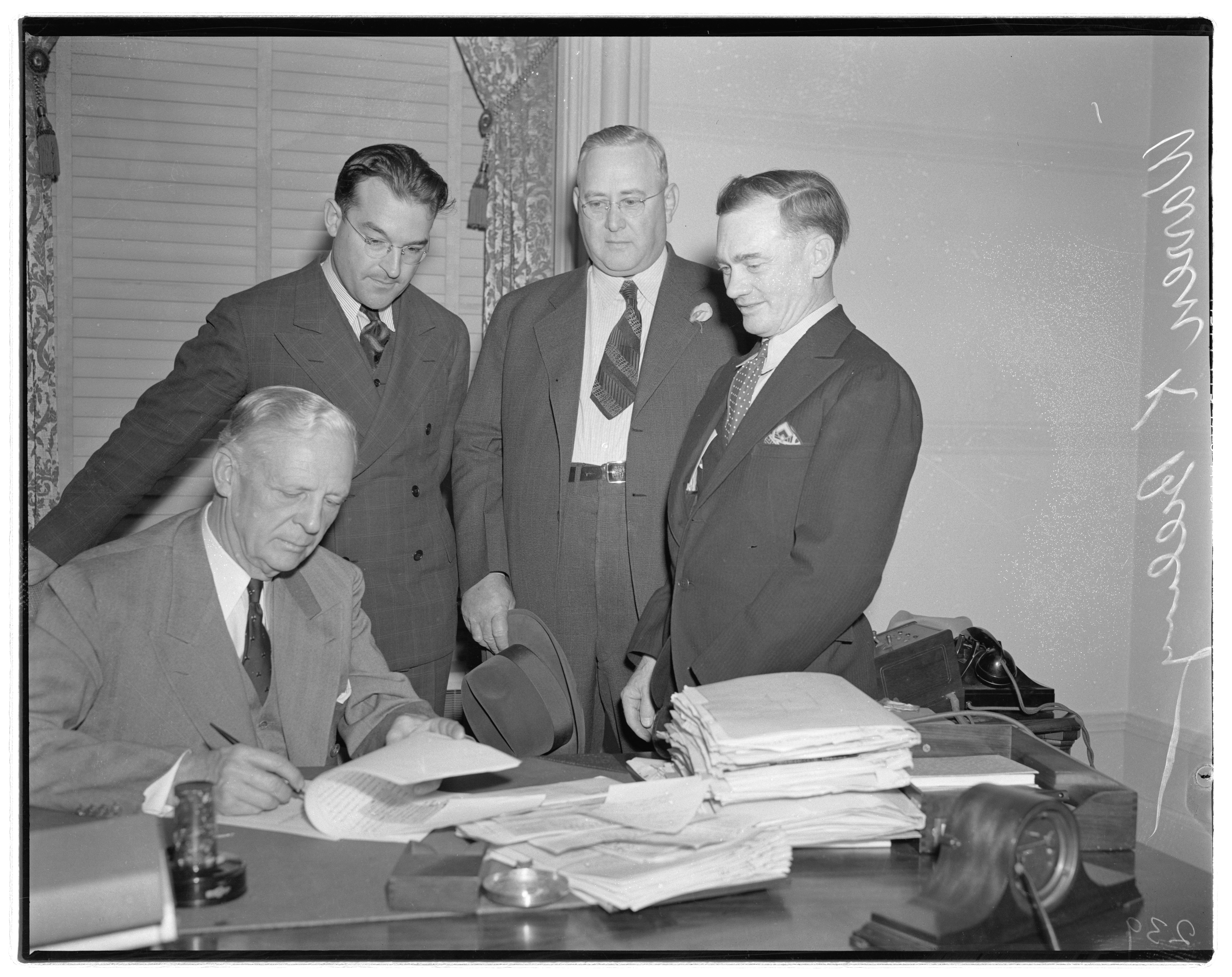
Governor Olson signs Billings's prison release, October 1939

Mooney was released earlier than Billings, but in 1939 the Supreme Court, voted to free Billings without a pardon. He had served twenty three years, two months and twenty days in prison. He went on to become chairman of Northern California Citizens Committee to Free Earl Browder in 1941. He was the chairman of the Vern Smith Defense Committee from 1947 to 1949. In 1955 he was a delegate at the AFL-CIO convention. Finally, in 1961 Governor Edmund G. Brown pardoned him. He also owned a watch repair shop and died in Redwood City California on September 4, 1972.

== See also ==
- Arthur E. Briggs, Los Angeles City Council member, 1939–41, supported Mooney pardon which led to Billings's pardon
- California courts of appeal
- Charles Fickert
- Communists in the United States Labor Movement (1919–37)
- Dreyfus affair
- Fremont Older
- Labor spying in the United States
- Labor unions in the United States
- Union violence in the United States
- Wickersham Commission
