= Thomas Mooney =

American political activist and labor leader (1882–1942)

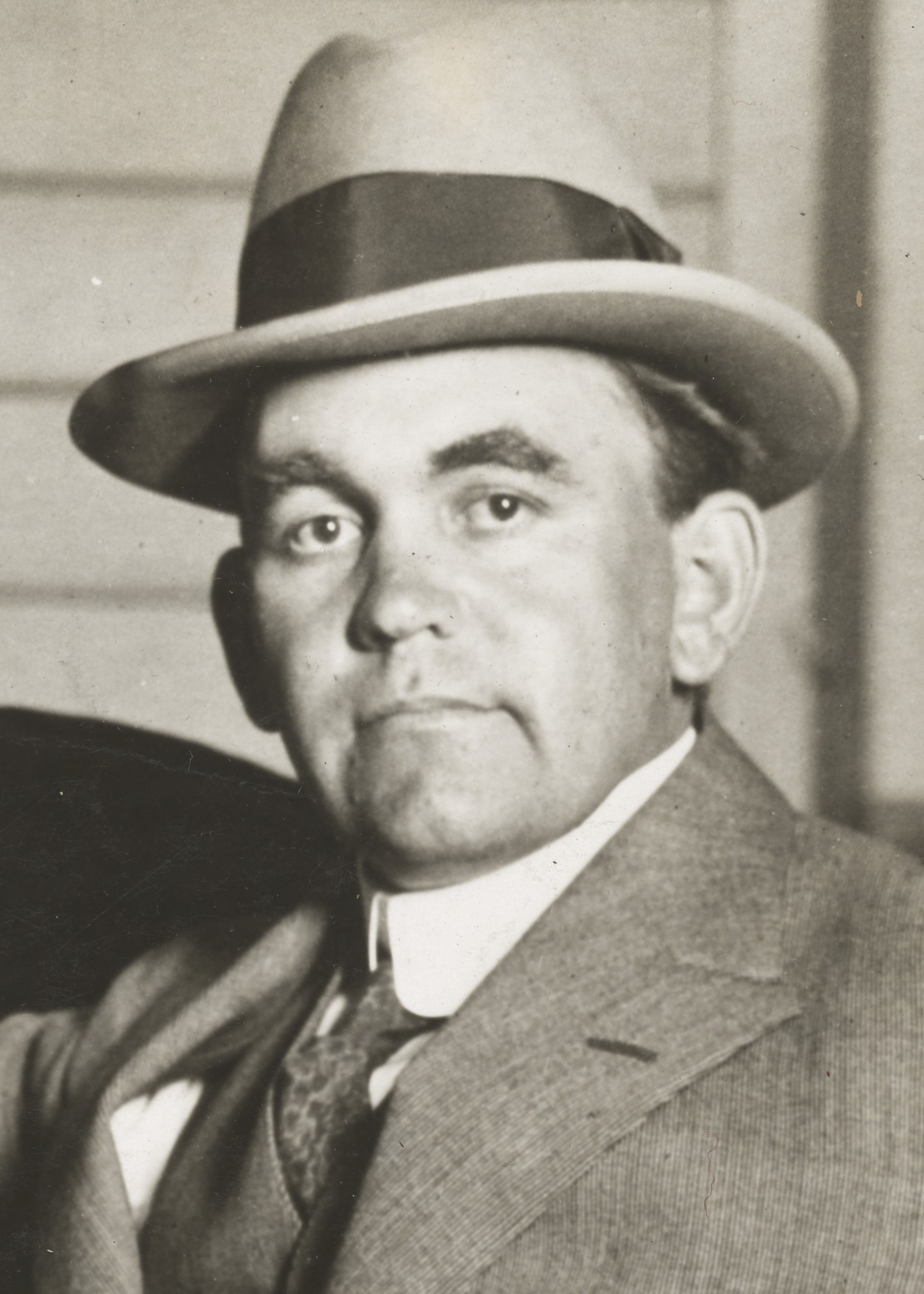
- Mooney in 1916
- Born: Thomas Joseph Mooney; December 8, 1882; Chicago, Illinois, US
- Died: March 6, 1942 (aged 59); San Francisco, California, US
- Resting place: Cypress Lawn Memorial Park; Colma, California; 37.6735°N 122.45519°W
- Occupations: Labor Leader; Militant; Social Reformer; Socialist Activist
- Known for: Wrongful conviction for 1916 Preparedness Day bombing
- Spouse: Rena Hermann
- Status: Pardoned in 1939
- Conviction: First degree murder
- Penalty: Death, commuted to life imprisonment
- Accomplices: Rena Hermann; Israel Weinberg; Edward Nolan; Warren K. Billings

Details
- Date apprehended: July 26, 1916
- Imprisoned at: San Quentin State Prison

Thomas Joseph Mooney (December 8, 1882 – March 6, 1942) was an American political activist and labor leader, who was convicted with Warren K. Billings of the San Francisco Preparedness Day Bombing of 1916. It quickly became apparent that Mooney and Billings had been convicted based on falsified evidence and perjured testimony; and the Mooney case and campaigns to free him became an international cause célèbre for two decades, with a substantial number of publications demonstrating the falsity of the conviction. These publications and the facts of the case are surveyed in Richard H. Frost, The Mooney Case (Stanford University Press, 1968). Mooney served 22 years in prison before being pardoned in 1939.

== Early life ==
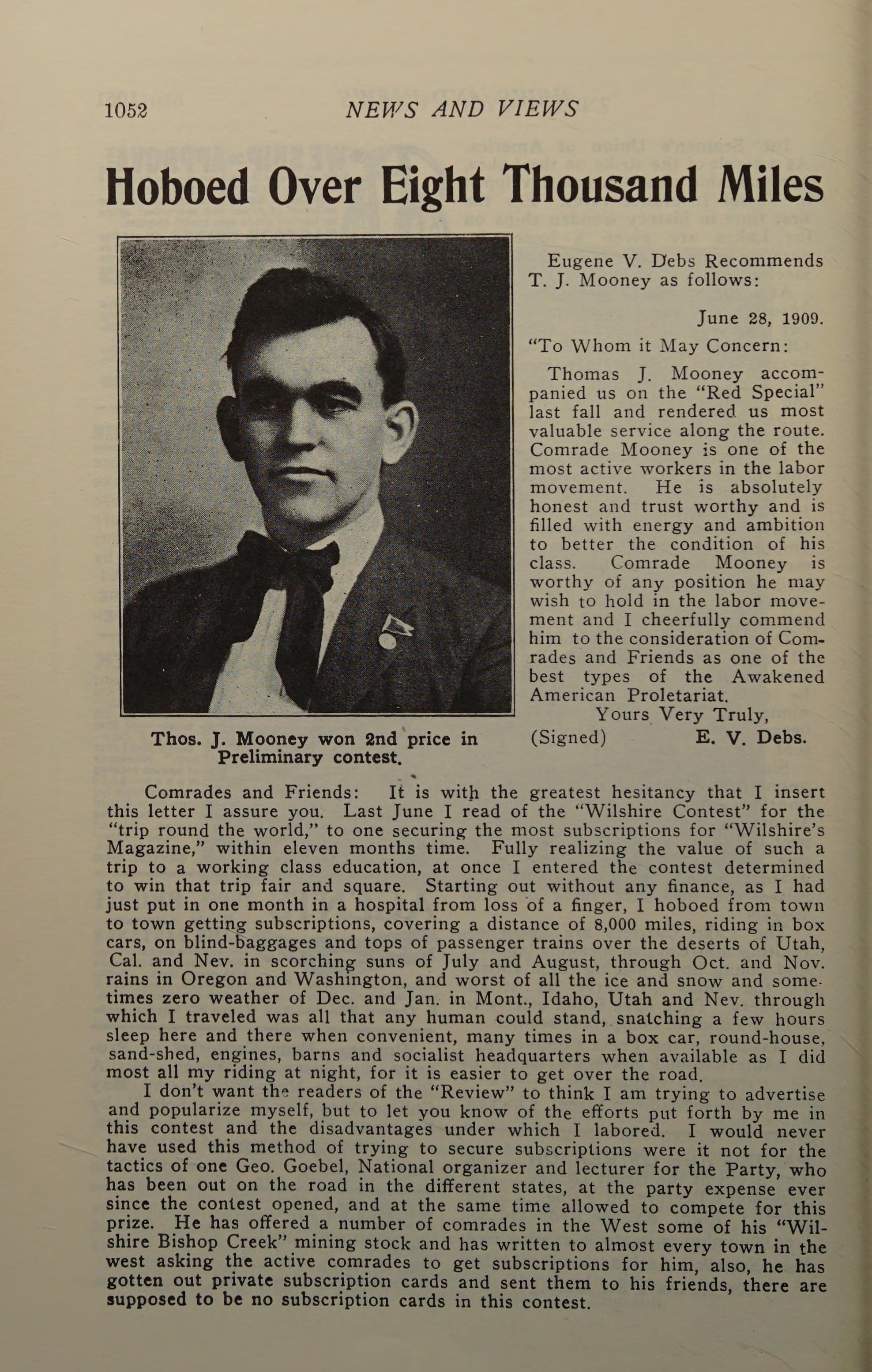
A page from the International Socialist Review's May 1910 issue, lauding Mooney for his work in the 1908 election

The son of Irish immigrants, Mooney was born in Chicago, Illinois on December 8, 1882. His father, Bernard, had been a coal miner and a militant organizer for the Knights of Labor in struggles so intense that after one fight he was left for dead. Bernard Mooney died of "miner's con" (silicosis) at the age of 36, when Tom, the eldest of three surviving children, was ten years old. Tom's sister Anna told neighbors that the family had originated in Holyoke, Massachusetts, not Chicago.

Thomas held many jobs as an industrial worker before developing a career as a labor leader and socialist activist. As a young man, Mooney toured Europe, where he learned about socialism. After arriving in California, he met his wife Rena, and found a place in the Socialist Party of America and the presidential campaign of Eugene V. Debs. Mooney also became a member of the militant industrial union the Industrial Workers of the World. In 1910, Mooney won a trip to the Second International Conference in Copenhagen by selling a huge number of subscriptions to the socialist Wilshire Magazine. On his way home, he visited the British Trades Union Congress in Sheffield, England.

== Preparedness Day Bombing ==
Ten deaths and forty injuries resulted from the explosion in the midst of the Preparedness Day parade. The bombing took place at the height of anarchist violence in the United States, especially the Galleanist anarcho-communist movement of Luigi Galleani.

== Trial ==
Mooney and Billings were convicted in separate trials. Mooney was sentenced to be hanged and Billings to life imprisonment. Rena Mooney and Weinberg were acquitted.

== In prison ==
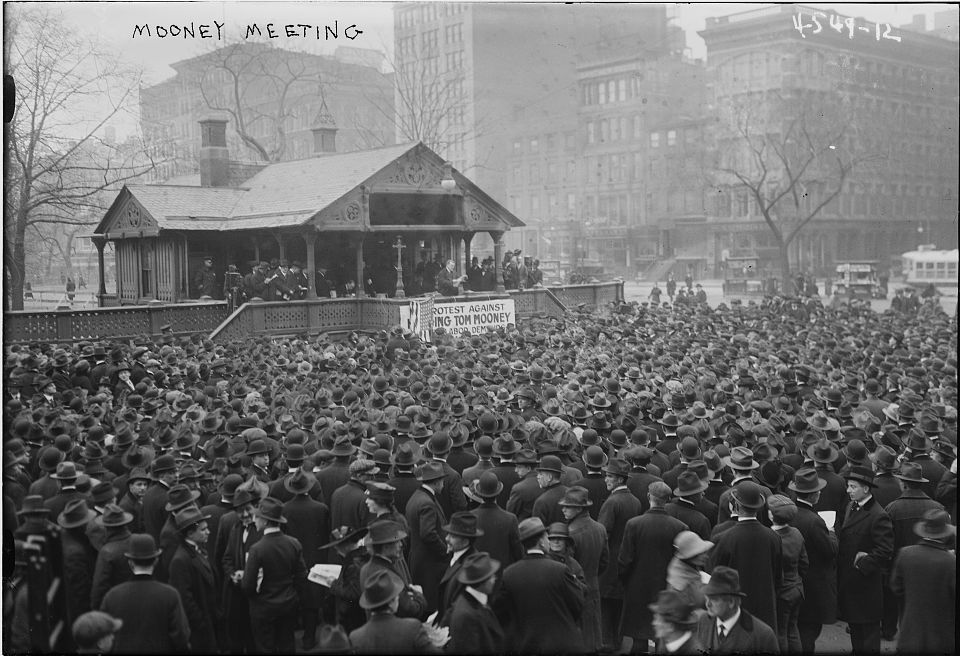
Thomas Mooney protest in Manhattan in Union Square on March 9, 1918

In 1918, Mooney's sentence was changed to life imprisonment by Governor William Stephens. Mooney quickly became one of the most famous political prisoners in America. A worldwide campaign to free Tom Mooney followed. During that time his wife Rena, Bulletin editor Fremont Older, anarchists Alexander Berkman and Emma Goldman, Lucy Robins Lang, heiress Aline Barnsdall, Hollywood celebrities, international politicians, and many other well-known people campaigned for his release. Caroline Decker, a labor activist who later became active in California agricultural unionism, first went to California as part of a "Free Tom Mooney" delegation. While imprisoned, Mooney corresponded with fellow union leader Ned Cobb of the Alabama Sharecroppers' Union.

During his time at San Quentin, Mooney was a highly dependable orderly in the prison hospital. Dorothea Lange went to the prison to photograph him, and one of the photographs she took was used in a poster published by the Tom Mooney Defense Committee.

In 1931, New York City Mayor Jimmy Walker made a solidarity visit to Tom's sister Anna's house in San Francisco's Mission District.

== Release and later years ==
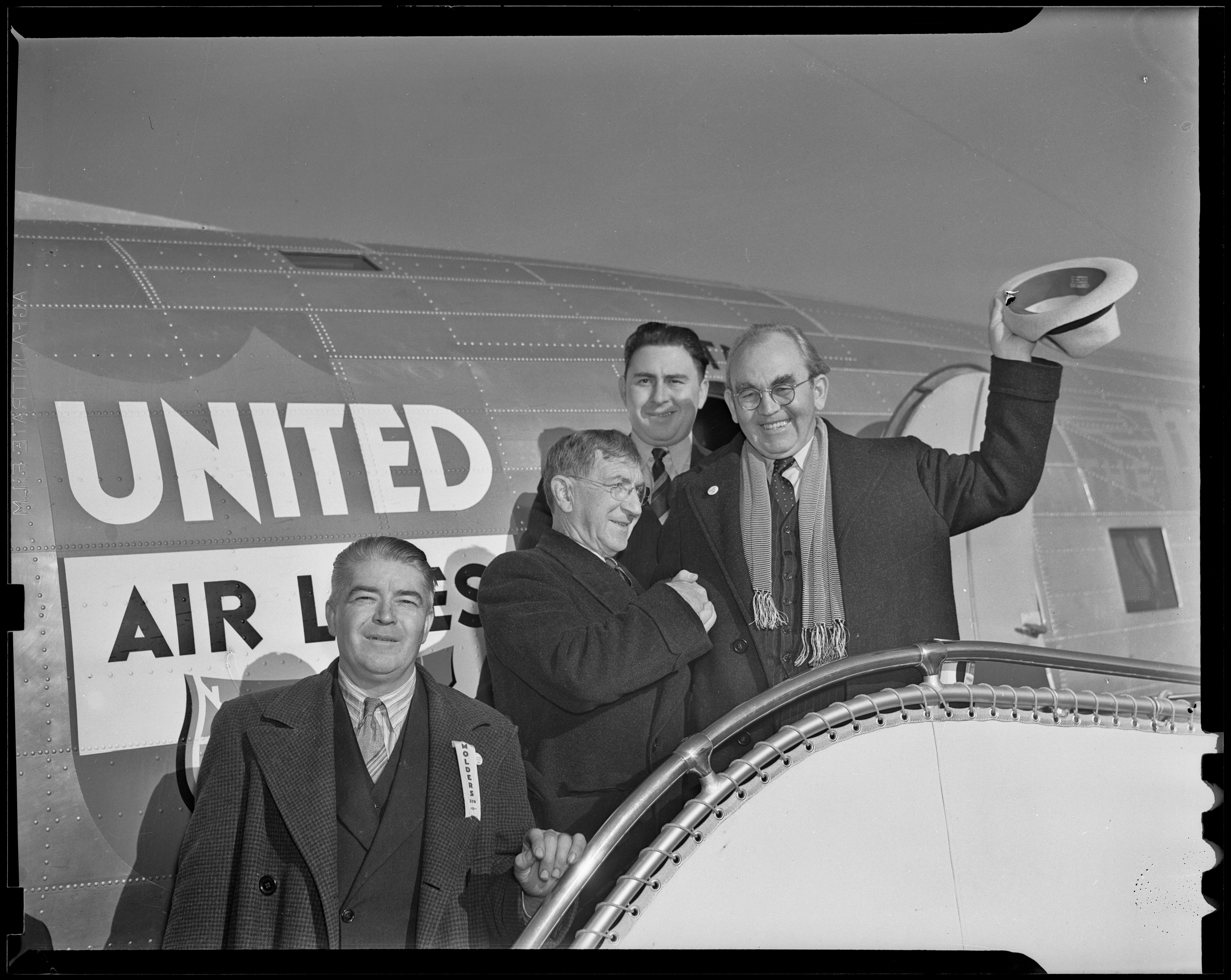
Mooney disembarking from a plane shortly after being pardoned, 1939

Mooney filed a writ of habeas corpus which was heard by the United States Supreme Court in 1937. Even though he presented evidence that his conviction was obtained through the use of perjured testimony and that the prosecution had suppressed favorable evidence, his writ was denied because he had not first filed a writ in state court. Nevertheless, his case is important because it helped establish that a conviction based upon false evidence violates due process. Mooney was pardoned in 1939 by liberal Democratic governor Culbert Olson.

He was old from years in prison, sick with ulcers and jaundice. He had not worn his martyrdom well; he broke with modest Billings, who was convicted with him but somehow was never regarded as a martyr; he was estranged from his wife; his former colleagues in the labor movement often found him to be selfish and conceited.

Mooney then campaigned for Billings's release although the two men had become estranged. He traveled around the country making speeches. He drew a full house at Madison Square Garden in New York City. Billings was released in 1939 and pardoned in 1961.

== Death and legacy ==
After attempting a lecture tour, Mooney collapsed from illness. The California Federation of Labor turned down a resolution to pay his bills, as his politics were deemed too radical. While dying in a San Francisco hospital, Mooney, at 59, had only a few visitors, and only a few letters from friends. From his bed he helped advance a campaign to free Communist Earl Browder as Chairman of the "Citizens' Committee to Free Earl Browder."

Mooney died at Saint Luke's Hospital in San Francisco on March 6, 1942. A large funeral celebration was held at the San Francisco Civic Auditorium. He is interred at Cypress Lawn Memorial Park in Colma, California.

== See also ==
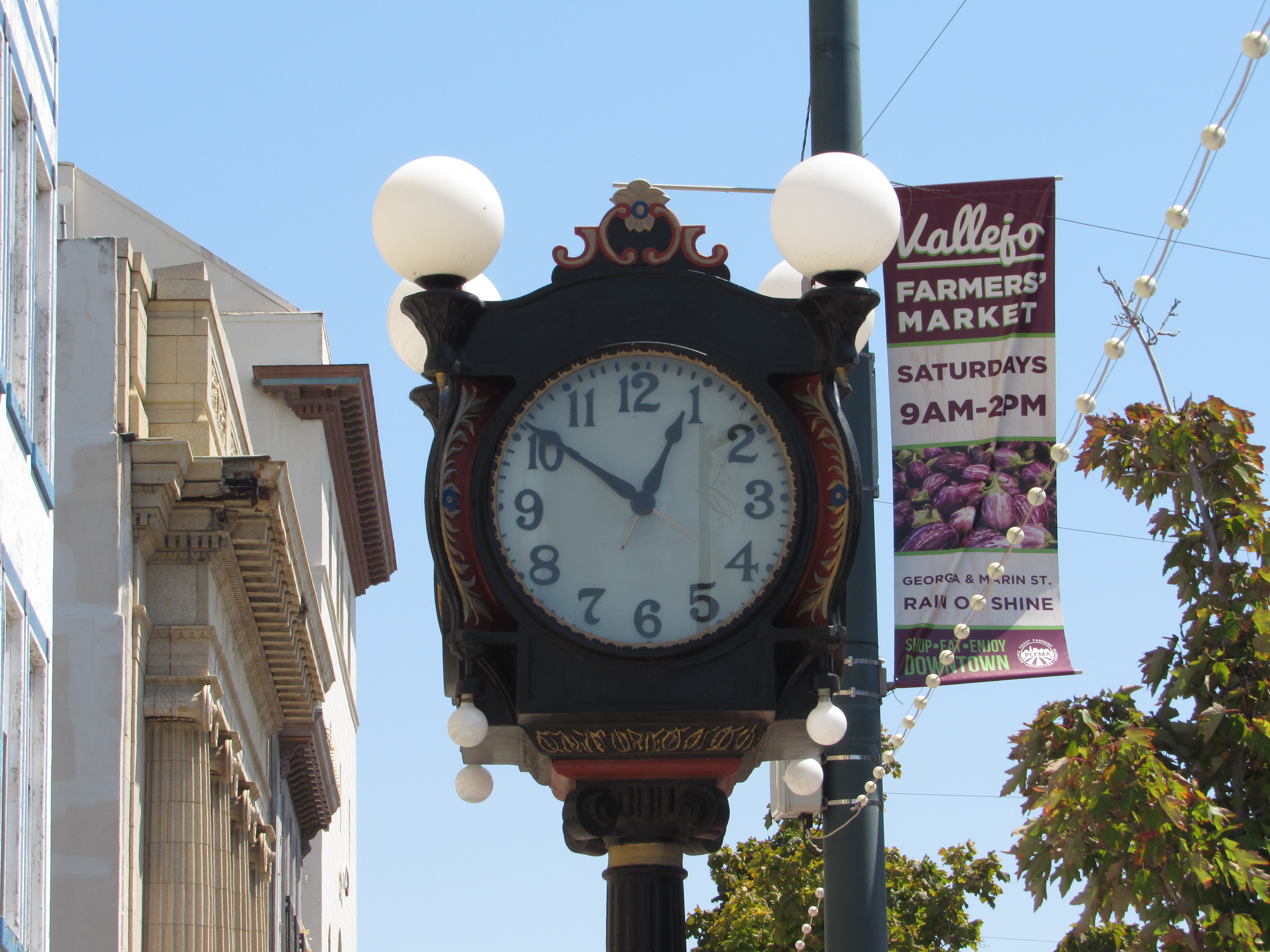
The Alibi Clock in Vallejo is City Landmark #5. It once sat at Market Street in San Francisco, and is considered the clock in the photograph that exonerated Mooney.

- Arthur E. Briggs, Los Angeles City Council member, 1939–41, supported Mooney pardon
- California courts of appeal
- Charles Fickert
- Communists in the United States Labor Movement (1919–37)
- Labor spying in the United States
- Labor unions in the United States
- List of wrongful convictions in the United States
- Sacco and Vanzetti
- Union violence in the United States
- Wickersham Commission
