= Preparedness Day bombing =

1916 bombing of a Preparedness Movement parade in San Francisco, California

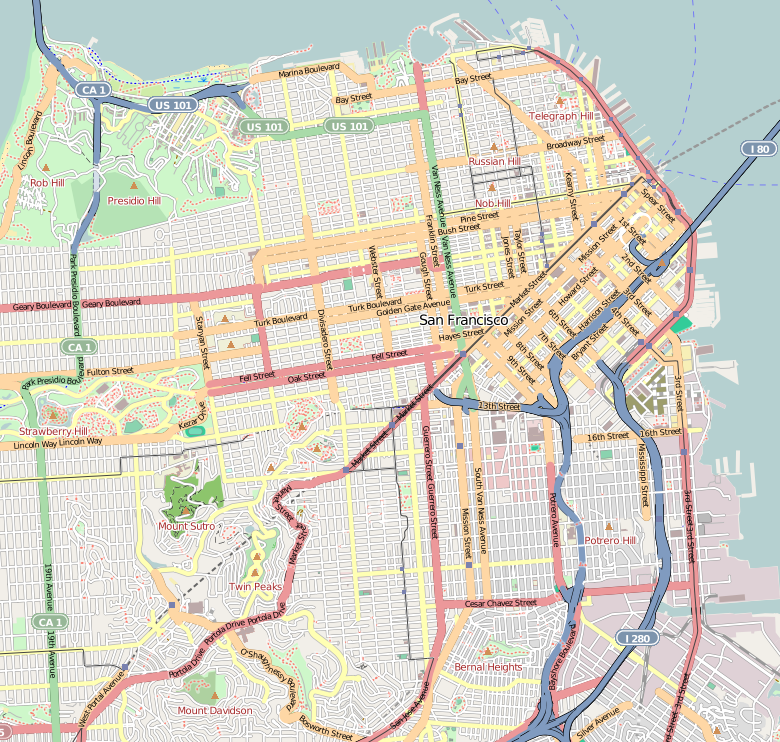
- Location: 37.794167°N 122.394444°W; Embarcadero, San Francisco, California, U.S.
- Date: July 22, 1916; 2:06 p.m. (UTC−08:00)
- Target: Preparedness Day Parade
- Attack type: Bombing
- Weapon: Time bomb
- Deaths: 10
- Injuries: 40
- Perpetrator: Undetermined
- Motive: Opposition to World War I
- Accused: Warren Billings; Rena Hermann; Thomas Mooney; Ed Nolan; Israel Weinberg
- Verdict: Death, commuted to life imprisonment (later pardoned)
- Convicted: Warren Billings; Thomas Mooney; (both later pardoned)

The Preparedness Day bombing was a bombing in San Francisco, California, United States, on July 22, 1916, of a parade organised by local supporters of the Preparedness Movement which advocated American entry into World War I. During the parade a suitcase bomb was detonated, killing 10 and wounding 40 in the worst terrorist attack in San Francisco's history.

Two labor leaders, Thomas Mooney and Warren Billings, were convicted in separate trials. Mooney was sentenced to death, later commuted to life in prison, and Billings received a life sentence. Later investigations found the convictions to have been based on false testimony, and the men were released in 1939 and eventually pardoned. The identity of the bombers has never been determined.

== Prelude ==
By mid-1916, after viewing the carnage in Europe, the United States saw itself poised on the edge of participation in World War I. Isolationism remained strong in San Francisco, not only among radicals such as the Industrial Workers of the World ("the Wobblies"), but also among mainstream labor leaders. At the same time, with the rise of Bolshevism and labor unrest, San Francisco's business community was nervous. The Chamber of Commerce organized a Law and Order Committee, despite the diminishing influence and political clout of local trade unions. The Preparedness Day Parade was organized by the Chamber of Commerce and the anti-union conservative business establishment.

== Parade ==
The huge Preparedness Day Parade of Saturday, July 22, 1916, was a target of radicals. An unsigned anti-war pamphlet issued throughout the city in mid-July read in part, "We are going to use a little direct action on the 22nd to show that militarism can't be forced on us and our children without a violent protest." Labor leader Thomas Mooney had been tipped off to threats that preceded the parade and pushed resolutions through his union, the Molders; the San Francisco Central Labor Council; and the Building Trades Council warning that provocateurs might attempt to blacken the labor movement by causing a disturbance at the parade.

The parade was the largest ever held in the city. The 3.5 hour procession had 51,329 marchers, including 2,134 organizations and 52 bands. Ironically, perhaps, the starting signals were "the crash of a bomb and the shriek of a siren." Military, civic, judicial, state, and municipal divisions were followed by newspaper, telephone, telegraph and streetcar unions. Many of the following divisions came from other cities of the San Francisco Bay Area.

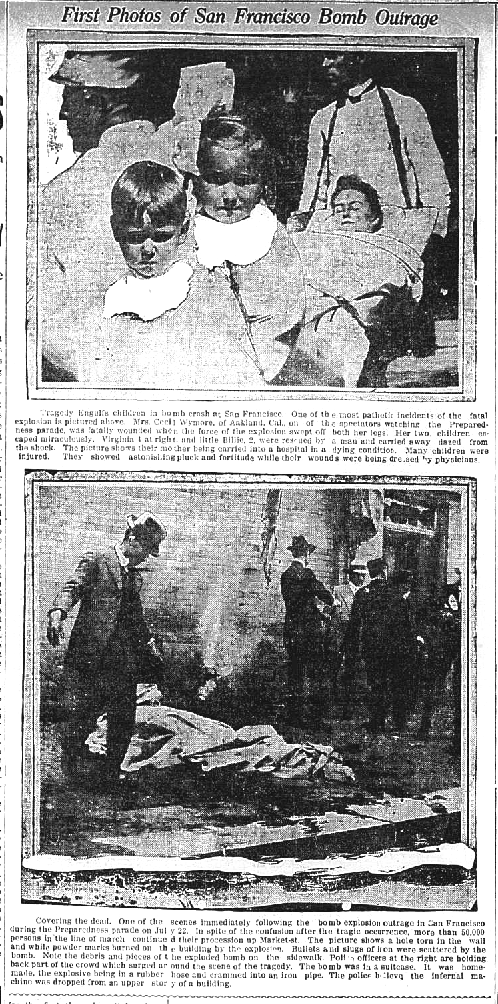
Newspaper photos of the living victims (top) and the dead (bottom)

At 2:06 p.m., about half an hour into the parade, a time bomb in the form of a cast steel pipe filled with explosives detonated on the west side of Steuart Street, just south of Market Street, about 450 feet from the Ferry Building. Before capping the steel pipe containing the explosive (believed by police to have been either TNT or dynamite), the bomb-maker had filled the pipe with metal slugs designed to act as shrapnel, greatly increasing the bomb's lethality. Ten bystanders were killed and forty wounded, including a young girl who had her legs blown off. The bombing was the worst terrorist act in San Francisco history.

Witnesses differed on where the bomb was located. Some witnesses stated that they saw a man leaving a suitcase against the corner of a building at Market and Steuart streets that contained the bomb, while others, such as Dr. Mora Moss, testified he saw the bomb being hurled or dropped from the roof of a nearby building, rather than being left at the scene.

== Trials and convictions ==
Led by San Francisco District Attorney Charles Fickert, authorities initially focused their attention on several well-known radicals and anarchists in the city, among them Alexander Berkman, who was well known to the government for his radical politics and prior conviction as an attempted assassin. He had only recently relocated to San Francisco after being implicated in yet another bombing conspiracy, the Lexington Avenue bombing in New York City, which resulted in the deaths of several anarchists and at least one innocent bystander. While in San Francisco, Berkman had begun his own anarchist journal, which he named The Blast. After the Preparedness Day bombing, Berkman abruptly abandoned The Blast and returned to New York, rejoining Emma Goldman to work on the Mother Earth Bulletin. Fickert attempted to have Berkman extradited back to San Francisco on conspiracy charges related to the bombing, but was unsuccessful.

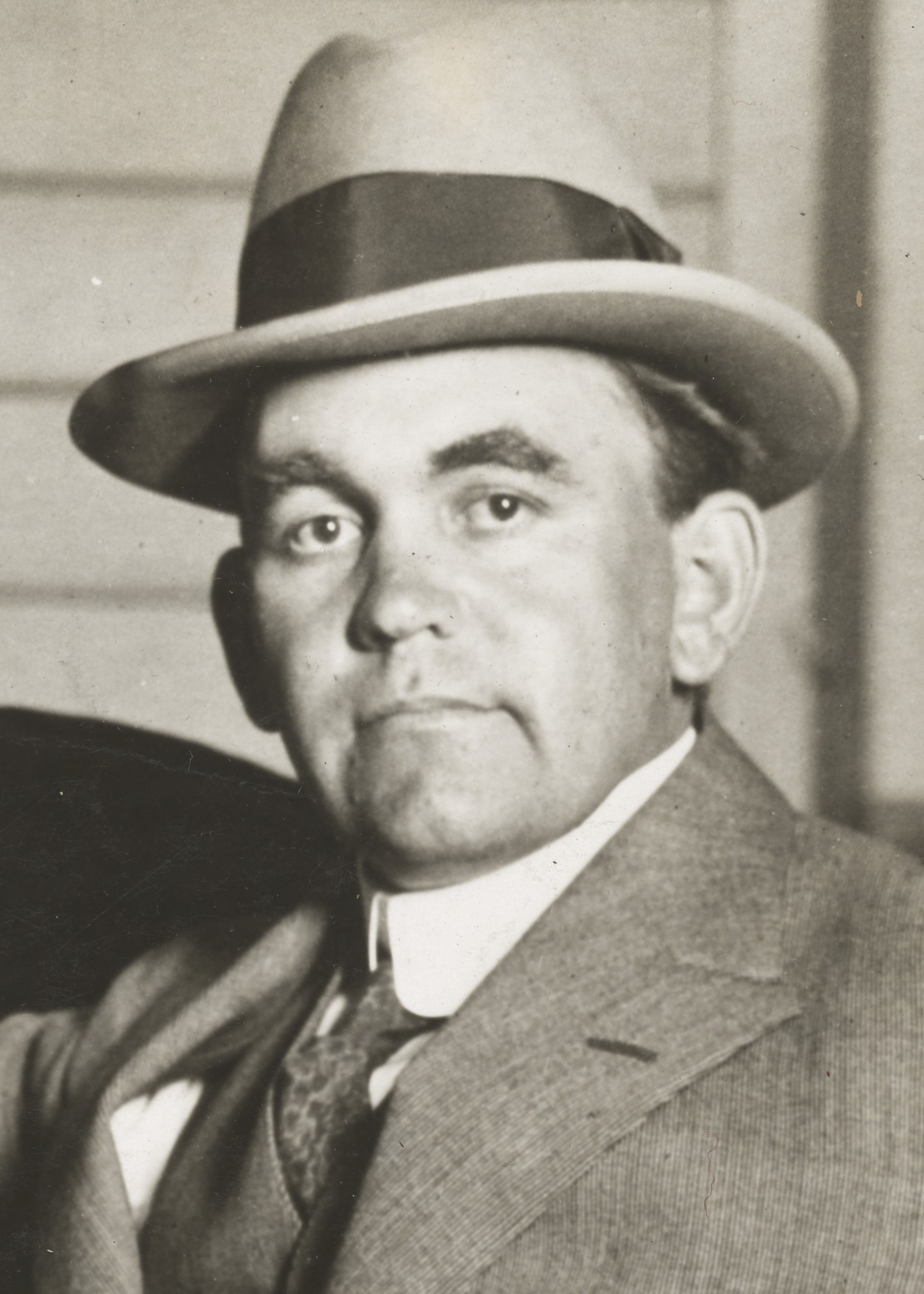
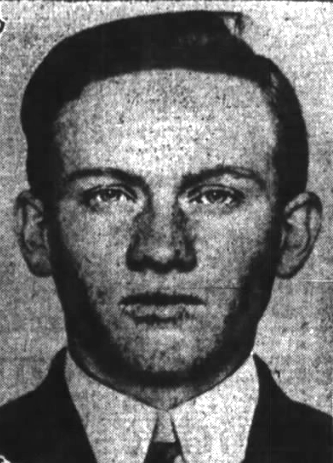
Mooney (left) in July 1916 and Billings (right) c. 1916

Two known radical labor leaders – Thomas Mooney (ca. 1882–1942) and his assistant, Warren K. Billings (1893–1972) – were eventually arrested. Billings, convicted previously for carrying dynamite on a passenger train, had a reputation for enjoying terrorist actions; and Mooney, a militant socialist, had been arrested but never convicted for conspiring to dynamite power lines during the 1913 Pacific Gas and Electric Company strike. Mooney and his wife had also previously been arrested for unsuccessfully attempting to stop streetcar operations during a planned streetcar motorman strike, and he was known for being on the "radical" side of labor activists.

The conservative leaders of local unions and editors of labor trade papers disliked Mooney intensely, believing him to be a "dangerous troublemaker" whose methods "never produced anything but trouble." Mooney and especially Billings both had prior knowledge of how to use dynamite. Billings was also familiar with clockwork timing mechanisms, and became a watch repairman after his release from prison.

Police held Mooney incommunicado and without counsel for six days, during which time they attempted to interrogate him. Mooney declined to speak, invoking his right to counsel some 41 times. At the grand jury proceedings, the suspects were still without counsel and were not permitted to shave or clean up before appearing before the grand jury. The defendants refused to testify in protest of having been denied counsel. After the grand jury returned an indictment, Mooney and his wife Rena, Warren Billings, Israel Weinberg, and Ed Nolan were charged with murder.

Fickert alleged that Mooney had planted the suitcase at the bomb scene, which contained a dynamite bomb with a clock as a timing mechanism. Fickert and the police discounted the testimony of witnesses whose descriptions did not fit Mooney and Billings, or whose description of the bombing did not support the district attorney's theory that Mooney had planted the bomb. Mooney and Billings eventually retained a well-known San Francisco criminal attorney, Maxwell McNutt, as their defense counsel.

In a set of trials, Billings was tried first in September 1916, followed by Thomas Mooney in January 1917. Both were convicted and sentenced to death. Rena Mooney and Israel Weinberg were both acquitted. Ed Nolan was never brought to trial and was released two months after Thomas Mooney's conviction.

== Pardons ==
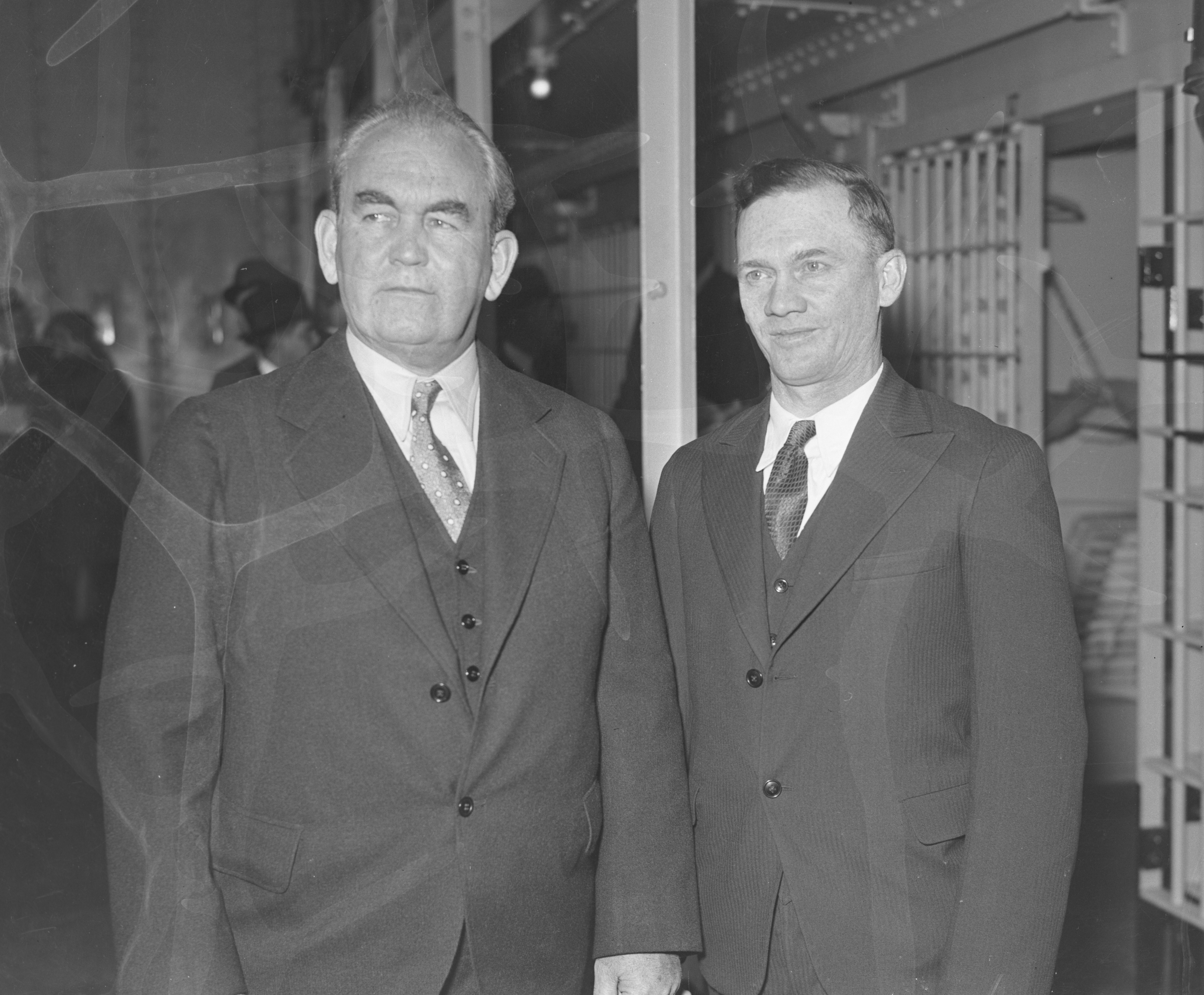
Mooney and Billings at the San Francisco Hall of Justice, 1935

Two years later, a Mediation Commission set up by President Woodrow Wilson found no clear evidence of Mooney's guilt, and his death sentence was commuted. Billings' sentence was also commuted to life imprisonment. The Mooney case and campaigns to free him became an international cause celebre for two decades, with a substantial literature of publications demonstrating the falsity of the conviction. Evidence of perjury and false testimony at the trial became overwhelming, but repeated efforts to reverse the convictions or pardon Mooney and Billings were consistently blocked for twenty years until the election of leftist California Governor Culbert Olson, who pardoned both men.

== Later investigations ==
Although the identity of the bomber (or bombers) has never been precisely determined, the bombing has been attributed by several historians to anarchists espousing direct action or propaganda of the deed. In addition to the language of the unsigned July warning leaflet, the Preparedness Day Parade had been organized by the Chamber of Commerce and the anti-union conservative business establishment to inspire patriotism and support for U.S. entry into the war, a development that could hardly fail to infuriate anarchists. Besides Mooney and Billings, several persons are thought to have been capable of carrying out such a violent attack, all of them anarchists and advocates of direct action. Others considered the bombing to be the act of an agent provocateur.

Postwar research has led some historians to suspect involvement at some level in the bombing conspiracy by the anarchist Alexander Berkman, given his knowledge of the Lexington Avenue bombing conspiracy, his enthusiasm for revolutionary violence while editor of The Blast, and his hasty departure from San Francisco immediately following the Preparedness Day bombing. However, whether he was involved in the conspiracy or not, Berkman was almost certainly not the person who constructed the actual bomb, since he was known to have little or no technical skills with explosives.

Another suspect group included the Galleanists, radical anarchist followers of Luigi Galleani, particularly the elusive Mario Buda. A bomb-maker of deadly repute, Buda fit at least one witness's physical description of the bomber, and the Galleanists were known to utilize time bombs consisting of cast steel or iron pipes packed with dynamite and metal slugs or other types of shrapnel to increase maiming and overall casualties. While the Galleanists conducted most of their bomb attacks on the East Coast, there was a large and restive Italian anarchist community in San Francisco at the time, and many of them subscribed to Galleani's journal, Cronaca Sovversiva (Subversive Chronicle), which openly called for direct action via propaganda of the deed while glorifying the assassination of "militarists" and "capitalists".

The Galleanists were known for their ruthlessness in choosing targets, had avidly participated in successful bomb attacks as far west as Milwaukee and Chicago, and in 1919 had unleashed a campaign of mail bombings to victims all over the country, including two booby-trap bombs sent to Fickert and his assistant Edward A. Cunha in San Francisco. Galleani himself wrote that police had not arrested "the right criminal", later telling investigators that he was "positively sure" with "mathematical certitude" that Mooney was not the bomber.

The Galleanists would go on to utilize bomb designs nearly identical to that of the Preparedness Day bomb in several subsequent attacks during 1918 and 1919, while Buda was the prime suspect in the later and very similar Wall Street bombing in 1920. Additionally, in an apparent oblique reference to an event in February 1916 in which a Galleanist operative in Chicago, Nestor Dondoglio, served poisoned soup to a host of political, religious, and business leaders, San Francisco police recovered two unsigned letters urging the headwaiter at the St. Francis Hotel to serve poisoned soup to Police Commissioner James Woods, one of the organizers of the Preparedness Day march, when Woods next came to dine there.

Yet another possible suspect is Celsten Eklund, a well-known San Francisco radical orator, unemployed laborer, and passionate anarchist who had been previously involved in a series of labor demonstrations and altercations with police, and who was believed to have strong ties to the Italian anarchist community. On March 6, 1927, Eklund and another man known only as "Ricca" were shot by police as they attempted to light the fuse of a large dynamite bomb in front of the Saints Peter and Paul Catholic Church in San Francisco. Ricca died at the scene and Eklund was seriously wounded. The church, which had been the target of four previous bombings in the space of one year, had been a magnet for anarchist anti-Catholic sentiment in the city. Eklund later died of his wounds without revealing anything to police save for the Italian last name of his fellow bomber.

== See also ==
American Union Against Militarism	League to Enforce Peace
Anarchism and Other Essays	Milwaukee Police Department bombing
Anarchism and violence	Palmer Raids
Espionage Act of 1917	Progressive Era
Federal Explosives Act of 1917	Selective Service Act of 1917
Fellowship of Reconciliation	The Liberator
Joseph and Michael Hofer	The Masses
