= Coudert =

Coudert may refer to:

- Coudert (surname)
- Coudert Brothers, a New York law firm

== See also ==
- Lurquin-Coudert, a French automobile
- Rapp-Coudert Committee, a New York State Legislature committee
