= Coudert (surname) =

Coudert is a French surname. Notable people with the surname include:

- Amalia Küssner Coudert (1863–1932), American miniaturist
- Frederic René Coudert Jr. (1898–1972), American politician
- Frederic René Coudert Sr. (1832–1903), American lawyer
- Gregoire Coudert (born 1999), French footballer
- Robin Coudert (born 1978), French musician
