= Frederic Coudert Jr. =

American politician (1898–1972)

Frederic René Coudert Jr.
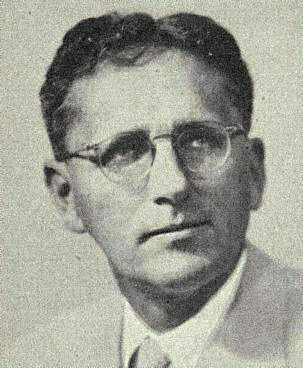

Member of the U.S. House of Representatives from New York's 17th district
- In office January 3, 1947 – January 3, 1959
- Preceded by: Joseph C. Baldwin
- Succeeded by: John Lindsay

Member of the New York State Senate from the 20th district
- In office 1945–1946
- Preceded by: Alexander A. Falk
- Succeeded by: MacNeil Mitchell

Member of the New York State Senate from the 17th district
- In office 1939–1944
- Preceded by: Leon A. Fischel
- Succeeded by: Robert S. Bainbridge

Personal details
- Born: May 7, 1898 New York City, US
- Died: May 21, 1972 (aged 74) New York City, US
- Party: Republican
- Spouses: Mary Callery (m. 1923; div. 1930); Paula Murray (m. 1931)
- Children: 3
- Parent: Frederic René Coudert II (father)
- Relatives: Frederic René Coudert Sr. (grandfather)
- Education: Columbia College; Columbia Law School
- Awards: Columbia University Medal for Distinguished Public Service; Legion of Honor (Chevalier) (France)

Military service
- Allegiance: United States
- Branch/service: United States Army
- Years of service: 1917–1919
- Rank: First Lieutenant
- Unit: 105th Infantry Regiment, 27th Division
- Battles/wars: World War I

Frederic René Coudert Jr. (May 7, 1898 – May 21, 1972) was a member of the United States House of Representatives from New York from 1947 to 1959, and a member of the New York State Senate from 1939 to 1946. Prior to serving in Congress, he was best known for his role with New York's Rapp-Coudert Committee, which attempted to identify the extent of communist influence in the state of New York's public education system. The committee's inquiries led to the dismissal of more than 40 instructors and staff members at the City College of New York, actions the committee's critics regarded as a political "witch-hunt."

== Background ==
Coudert was born in New York City on May 7, 1898, the son of Frederic René Coudert II (1871–1955) and Alice T. (Wilmerding) Coudert. He attended the Browning and Morristown Schools in New York City, then entered Harvard College in 1916, but when the US entered World War I, Coudert joined the Army. He served in France as a first lieutenant assigned to the 105th Infantry Regiment, a unit of the 27th Division. In 1918, he received his Bachelor of Arts degree from Columbia College as part of a program that awarded degrees to military members through a combination of academic study and military service. At Columbia, Frederic R. Coudert Jr. was a member of the Philolexian Society.

Coudert was discharged from the army in 1919 and began attending Columbia Law School. He received his LL.B. degree in 1922, was admitted to the bar in 1923, and commenced practice in New York City. He served as an assistant United States attorney for the Southern District of New York in 1924 and 1925.

== Politics ==
Coudert was a member of The New York Young Republican Club. He was an unsuccessful Republican candidate for New York County District Attorney in 1929. He was a delegate to the Republican state conventions every two years from 1930 to 1948, and the Republican National Conventions every four years from 1936 to 1948.

From 1939 to 1946, Coudert was a member of the New York State Senate, sitting in the 162nd, 163rd, 164th and 165th New York State Legislatures.

He was elected as a Republican to the 80th Congress, easily defeating a three-term liberal Republican in the primary. He was reelected to the 81st, 82nd, 83rd, 84th and 85th United States Congresses, holding office from January 3, 1947, to January 3, 1959. In his first term he gained a rare freshman appointment to the Appropriations Committee. In the 85th Congress (1957 to 1959), he became the ranking Republican on the Appropriations Subcommittee on Departments of State and Justice, the Judiciary and Related Agencies. Coudert voted in favor of the Civil Rights Act of 1957.

In 1954 and 1956 Coudert won reelection with fewer than 51% of the vote. Facing a rising young Republican liberal, John V. Lindsay, in 1958, he ceded the Republican nomination and retired from the House.

== Post-congressional career ==
He continued his practice of law in New York City, and was also a member of the State Commission on Governmental Operations of New York City from 1959 to 1961. Coudert was an outspoken conservative and endorsed William F. Buckley's 1965 Conservative campaign for the New York City mayoralty over liberal Republican Congressman John Lindsay.

== Retirement and death ==
He retired due to ill health, and died in New York City on May 21, 1972. He was buried at Memorial Cemetery in Cold Spring Harbor, New York.

== Awards ==
In 1941, Coudert received the Columbia University Medal for Distinguished Public Service. In addition, he was a recipient of the French Legion of Honor (Chevalier) to recognize his efforts on behalf of the French people, including serving as president of the federation of French Alliances In the United States.

== Family ==
In June 1923, Coudert married sculptor Mary Callery. The marriage ended in divorce in May 1931, and in October of that year he married Paula Murray. With his first wife, Coudert was the father of daughter Caroline. With his second, he was the father of son Frederic R. "Fritz" and daughter Paula.

Coudert was the grandson of prominent attorney Frederic René Coudert Sr. and great-grandson of Benjamin F. Tracy, who served as United States Secretary of the Navy from 1889 to 1893.

== See also ==
- Frederic René Coudert Sr.
- Rapp-Coudert Committee
- Lusk Committee

New York State Senate
Preceded by Leon A. Fischel	Member of the New York State Senate from the 17th district 1939–1944	Succeeded by Robert S. Bainbridge
Preceded by Alexander A. Falk	Member of the New York State Senate from the 20th district 1945–1946	Succeeded by MacNeil Mitchell
U.S. House of Representatives
Preceded by Joseph C. Baldwin	Member of the U.S. House of Representatives from New York's 17th congressional district 1947–1959	Succeeded by John V. Lindsay
