= McAlister Coleman =

American journalist, author, and political activist

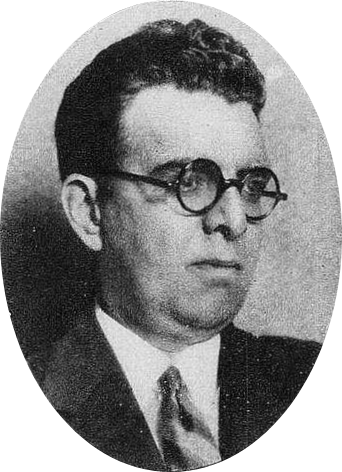
Coleman c. 1928

McAlister Coleman (July 3, 1888 – May 18, 1950) was an American journalist, author, and political activist on behalf of socialism and organized labor. Coleman gained public notice as a leading leftist critic of the Lusk Committee of the New York State Legislature in 1920. He was subsequently a frequent candidate for public office on the ticket of the Socialist Party of America. Coleman is today best remembered as an early biographer of Eugene V. Debs as well as the author of a 1943 work of social history, Men and Coal.

== Biography ==
=== Early years ===
McAlister Coleman was born July 3, 1888, in New York City. His father, John Caldwell Coleman, was a successful attorney and prominent figure in liberal New York Republican Party political circles.

Coleman enrolled at Columbia University in New York City where he was a member of the Philolexian Society. and graduated in 1909. After graduation, he worked as a journalist, first taking a position with the New York Sun. During the course of his work as a New York journalist, Coleman covered the New York garment workers strike of 1909–1910 as well as the catastrophic Triangle Shirtwaist Factory fire of 1912. These experiences had a radicalizing effect and not long after the Triangle fire he joined the Socialist Party of America (SPA) and — while still working for the Sun — Coleman began contributing articles to the SPA's New York daily newspaper, the New York Call.

Coleman left the Sun in 1913 and went to work in the field of advertising and public relations, first taking a position with the American Telephone and Telegraph Company, before leaving in 1914 to join the Frank Presbrey Advertising Agency. In 1916, Coleman left the Presbrey agency to take a new position as a copywriter for the Berrien Advertising Agency. He would remain at that position until 1922, interrupted only by a stint in the Army Engineers during World War I.

Coleman was twice married, marrying the former Elizabeth Bache Gould in April 1916, before remarrying Dr. Ruth Fox in 1931. He was the father of two children, a daughter and a son.

=== Political career ===
A tireless propagandist for the socialist cause, Coleman was the author of two Little Blue Books sponsored by the Socialist Party of America in 1931.

In 1920, Coleman entered the public eye as a prominent critic of the Lusk Committee of the New York state legislature — an investigative agency established in March 1919 which conducted a series of raids on the Russian Soviet Government Bureau (the de facto Soviet embassy), the Rand School of Social Science, and other radical institutions in New York City.

Coleman was the editor of a March 1920 report entitled The Truth About the Lusk Committee, which charged that the Lusk Committee and its Assistant Counsel and leading light Archibald E. Stevenson had accomplished little more than aiding the arrest and conviction of Big Jim Larkin and Benjamin Gitlow and two hapless Finnish language newspaper editors and spur on the widely condemned expulsion of five elected Socialist legislators from the New York State Assembly, all the while illegally overspending its legislative appropriation.

In 1920 Coleman was arrested in Meriden, Connecticut for conducting a series of socialist street meetings without a public permit. Convicted and levied a nominal $25 fine, Coleman appealed the case all the way to the Connecticut Supreme Court as a test of freedom of speech rights, ultimately seeing his conviction overturned with the finding that state and local ordinances giving public officials control over citizens' permission to speak were unconstitutional.

Coleman became assistant editor of The Illinois Miner in 1922, remaining with that publication until 1923. He also was a frequent contributor to a wide array of liberal and radical periodicals, including The New Republic, Labor Age, The Survey, and The Nation.

From the early 1920s onward, Coleman was active in the League for Industrial Democracy (LID) and the American Civil Liberties Union (ACLU). During the middle 1920s he was active in the Conference for Progressive Political Action (CPPA), a political organization bringing together socialist and non-socialist political figures with a view to starting a new labor party in the United States.

Coleman was particularly active as a reporter of the conditions and affairs of American coal miners throughout the 1920s, traveling the country as a corresponding journalist for the labor press and publicly lecturing to mine workers under the auspices of the United Mine Workers of America (UMWA). He traveled to West Virginia in 1925 to cover the bitter union organizing campaign there, suffering incarceration along with 200 others after being arrested at one non-union mine.

New York Socialist Senatorial candidate McAlister Coleman shared the podium with novelist Upton Sinclair and civil rights leader W. E. B. Du Bois on behalf of Norman Thomas for president in 1928.

Coleman was frequently a candidate for public office. In the fall of 1928 Coleman stood as the nominee of the Socialist Party for United States Senate in New York state. Coleman also ran as the Socialist nominee in the New York State Senate in 1930, for United States Congress from New York in both 1937 and 1938, and once again running for US Senate, this time from New Jersey, in 1940.

Coleman was a close political associate of six-time Socialist candidate for President of the United States Norman Thomas. Together with Thomas, Coleman sought move aside the so-called "Old Guard" of the party by working to develop an alternative Militant faction, youth-oriented and tending towards particularly radical political rhetoric. To this end, Coleman is credited by historian Jack Ross as the author of the first explicit document of the Militant faction's ideas, a 1931 pamphlet called A Militant Program for the Socialist Party of America: Socialism in Our Time.

=== Later years ===
In the late 1930s, Coleman moved to Newark, New Jersey and took a position working for the Congress of Industrial Organizations (CIO) as its publicity director.

Generally a publicist rather than a scholar or a historian, Coleman was the author of a broad array of pamphlets and magazine articles, but few longer works. One notable exception was his wartime magnum opus on coal miners and coal mining, Men and Coal, published by Farrar and Rinehart in the fall of 1943. Coleman provided a sympathetic portrait of the miners and their daily struggle to earn a living in the mining industry, while providing a mixed review of the personality and performance of mine workers' labor leader John L. Lewis, both criticizing him for instability and opportunism while acknowledging his achievements in organizing miners for higher wages and better working conditions.

=== Death and legacy ===
McAlister Coleman died on May 18, 1950, at his home in Manhattan. He was 62 years old at the time of his death.

Coleman was eulogized in the contemporary press as the "[Socialist] Party's public relations man," having worked tirelessly alongside SPA leader Norman Thomas writing pamphlets and letters to the press in an effort to advance the socialist cause.

== Bibliography ==
=== Books ===
- Coleman, McAlister, ed. (1920). The truth about the Lusk Committee : a report. New York: The Nation Press, for the Legislative Committee of the People's Freedom Union.
- "Herrin" Survey 53 (October 1, 1924), p. 56.
- "The Miners Turn to Giant Power," Annals of the American Academy of Political and Social Science, vol. 118, no. 1 (March 1925), pp. 60–62. In JSTOR
- Don't Tread on Me: A Study of Aggressive Legal Tactics for Labor. With Clement Wood and Arthur Garfield Hayes. New York: Vanguard Press, 1928. —Reissued as Legal Tactics for Labor's Rights.
- Pioneers of Freedom. New York: Vanguard Press, 1929.
- Eugene V. Debs: A Man Unafraid. New York: Greenberg, 1930.
- A Militant Program for the Socialist Party of America: Socialism in Our Time. With Theodore Shapiro and Robert Delson. New York: Program Committee, n.d. [1931].
- The Betrayal of the Workless. Girard, KS: Haldeman-Julius Publications, 1931.
- Pioneers of Socialism. Girard, KS: Haldeman-Julius Publications, 1931.
- Red Neck. With Stephen Rauchenbush. New York : Harrison Smith & Robert Haas, 1936. —Novel.
- Symbols of 1936, Roosevelt, Lemke, Thomas, Browder, Landon. New York: Thomas and Nelson Independent Committee, 1936.
- Men and Coal. New York: Farrar and Rinehart, 1943.

=== Essays and reporting ===
- Coleman, McAlister (April 4, 1925). "Porto Rico notes". New York, Etc. The New Yorker. Vol. 1, no. 7. p. 25.

== See also ==
- Powers Hapgood
