= American Jewish anti-Bolshevism during the Russian Revolution =

American Jewish anti-Bolshevism during the Russian Revolution describes the anti-communist views of certain American Jews after the February Revolution and October Revolution, a time that was also called the Red Scare. These views were mainly held by affluent American Jews. American Jewish leaders, such as Louis Marshall and Cyrus Adler, attempted to avoid contact with Bolsheviks and some actively engaged in anti-Bolshevik propaganda; many Jews took part in anti-Bolshevik organizations to help.

== Background ==
Bolshevism had a strong pull on poorer Jewish immigrants from Eastern Europe because they remembered antisemitism from their homelands and because they saw the Russian Revolution as a starting point of socialist democracy, which disturbed the wealthier, more established Jewish communities. These wealthier communities relied on official organizations in part to prevent the spread of radicalism to poorer Jewish communities and to check fears of Jewish Bolshevism.

== American Jewish anti-Bolshevik organizations during the first Red Scare ==
=== The Russian Information Bureau ===
The Russian Information Bureau was located in the Woolworth Building at 233 Broadway, Lower Manhattan, and it was an extension to the Russian Liberation Committee The Russian Information Bureau produced anti-Bolshevik propaganda in the United States immediately during the first years of the Red Scare; the Bureau was closely linked with the Russian Embassy in Washington and the American-Russian Chamber of Commerce. It was organized and directed by Arkady Joseph Sack, a Russian Jewish immigrant, and after November 1917, the Bureau included Louis Marshall, Jacob Schiff, Edwin Robert Anderson Seligman, Oscar S. Straus, and Stephen S. Wise as honorary advisers (other notable honorary advisers were: Theodore Roosevelt, Edward N. Hurley, Nicholas Murray Butler, Lawrence F. Abbot, Charles A Coffin, Darwin Kingsley, Samuel McRoberts, and Charles H. Sabin). Sack published the periodical, Struggling Russia, beginning March 22, 1919 through the Bureau, and the Bureau, additionally, published other anti-Bolshevik books, pamphlets, leaflets, and press releases by numerous authors including Sack. The Bureau supported Alexander Vasilyevich Kolchak and Anton Ivanovich Denikin, who were both high ranking Tsarist military officials in the White Movement during the Russian Civil War, and criticized the normalization of both political and economic relations between the United States Government and Bolshevik Russia. By June 1922, the Russian Information Bureau closed.

=== The American Jewish Committee ===
The members of the American Jewish Committee, which was formed in 1906, also dealt with the first Red Scare. During the Russian Revolution, the Committee worked to prevent the association of all Jews with Communism, and it was led by Louis Marshall. In 1918, Schiff wrote to Marshall that they should take Sack's warnings about the perceived Jewish involvement in the Bolshevik party and the results of this perception both in Russia and in the United States seriously by writing:

"dark days may indeed be in store for our coreligionists in Russia. But what is even worse, the danger exists even in our own country, that this tale of the Jews being back of the Bolshevik movement…may find considerable credence, which if we can, we should prevent."

— Jacob H. Schiff

In response, the executive committee of the American Jewish Committee on September 24, 1918, discussed a proposal with the following suggestions:

1. Starting a publicity campaign to inform the public about the current situation in Russia.
2. Issuing a statement on behalf of the executive committee of the American Jewish Committee that stated that most Jews in Russia were not sympathetic with the Bolsheviks despite the fact that some of Bolshevik leaders were Jews.
3. Writing a letter to President Woodrow Wilson to support his appeal for restoring order in Russia
4. Consulting Boris Alexandrovich Bakhmeteff on these matters

During this same meeting, it was decided that a special committee, including Louis Marshall, Cyrus Adler, and Oscar S. Straus be formed with the authorization to make disbursements out of the American Jewish Committee's Emergency Trust Fund.

==== Publicity Campaign and Public Statement ====
The executive committee of the American Jewish Committee discussed the positions of A. J. Sack and Harry Schneiderman on whether to admit that Jews were Bolsheviks in Russia at their meeting held on October 20, 1918, and the Committee decided to write a statement by the American Jewish Committee that would be issued by the State Department. The statement was called “The Jews and the Bolshevik Party”.

The Executive Committee of the American Jewish Committee deem it a duty to associate themselves most closely with the view of the Secretary of State and to express their horror and detestation of the mob tyranny incompatible with the ideas of a republican democracy which is now exercised by the Bolshevik government as being destructive of life, property and the political and personal rights of the individual. …All those political parties which sought to bring about reforms in Russia drew much of their strength and intellect from among the Jews, who had the most to gain from any amelioration of the political system. Jews were as prominent among the conservative reforms parties, such as the Cadets, as among the extreme radicals. …The Lenin-Trotsky Cabinet has several members of Jewish ancestry…which led to the erroneous assumption that the Jews of Russia were identified with this bloodthirsty and irresponsible group. The Jews of Russia in overwhelming proportion are not in sympathy with the doctrines and much less with the methods of the Bolsheviki. Lenin gas said of the Bund, which is a radical labor organization composed of Jews that they are worse than the Cadets. There are insistent reports that in many localities Jews are the victims of outrages at the hands of the Bolsheviki as bad if not worse than those suffered at the hands of the autocratic government. There are also reports that the Bolsheviki leaders have made vain attempts to range the Jews on their side by offering them government support for their theatres, schools and publishing enterprises.The Executive Committee of the American Jewish Committee have sincerely at heart the welfare of the Russian people and have full confidence in the ultimate emergence of Russia as one of the greatest democracies in the family of nations. The Committee are profoundly appreciative of the fact that one of the first acts of the Russian people after the Revolution was the emancipation of the five million Jews of Russia. They would, therefore, regards as a great calamity both to the Jews of Russia and to the future of Russia itself, the general acceptance of the erroneous idea that the Jews of Russia, as such, countenance the misdeeds of the Bolsheviki. While there are Jews identified with the Bolsheviki movement, this is merely because Jews are affiliated with all parties in Russia. …It is as unjust and unreasonable to infer from the prominence of some individuals Jews in the Bolshevik peart that the Jews of Russia subscribe to it, as to infer the contrary from the isolated fact that a Jewish girl attempted to assassinate Lenin. Such an inference if generally accepted would be eagerly seized upon by the reactionary elements of Russia who would once again make of the Jews a scapegoat for all the wrong suffered by Russia because of Bolshevik misrule. As the main body of the Jews are ranged on the side of law and order in Russia, this would be a great calamity and would help to defer the realization of the hopes of those who are working for the early creation in Russia of an orderly, democratic government.

The Executive Committee of the American Jewish Committee, AJC Archives, Adler files

The previous statement was issued together with the support of the State Department and the following statement was sent by telegram to all American ambassadors and ministers in the Allied and neutral countries along with the American Jewish Committee's statement:

In view of the earnest desire of the people of the United States to befriend the Russian people and lend them all possible assistance in their struggle to reconstruct their nation upon the principles of democracy and self-government, and acting therefore solely in the interests of the Russian people themselves, this Government feels that it cannot be silent or refrain from expressing its horror at this existing terrorism. Furthermore, it believes that in order successfully to check the further increase of the indiscriminate slaughter of Russian citizens all civilized nations should register their abhorrence of such barbarism.

State Department Statement, AJC Archives, Adler Files

Throughout the decade, the committee had to return to the topic of Jewish participation in the Bolshevik party in part because of the high rate of participation of Jews that were American Communists.

== Central figures ==
=== Louis Marshall ===
In 1919 during the Overman Committee hearings, Marshall was called on as a witness as a member of the anti-Bolshevik Russian community. In 1920, Marshall was accused of being the head of an American Jewish plot in the anti-Semitic articles written in the Dearborn Independent. In reaction, Marshall organized a unified protest against the Dearborn Independent, including Woodrow Wilson and William Howard Taft, and he also convinced the Federal Council of Churches to no longer financially support Ford.

=== Arkady Joseph Sack ===
Arkady Josephy Sack was the director of the Russian Information Bureau from its opening until its closing. He published articles, periodicals, and books between 1917 and 1922 on the February Revolution, October Revolution, Bolshevism, Russia and the role of peasants and Jews in the Bolshevik party.

==== Selected publications ====
- Sack, A. J. 1918. The Birth of the Russian Democracy. New York: Russian Information Bureau.
- Sack, A. J. 1919. Struggling Russia. New York: Russian Information Bureau.
- Sack, A. J. 2001 [original print 1919]. "Democracy and Bolshevism." The Annals of the American Academy of Political and Social Science Vol 84 (1), pp. 102–107.

== Controversies ==
=== Resignation of Judah Leon Magnes ===
Judah Leon Magnes was a rabbi, brother-in-law to Louis Marshal and member of the executive committee of the American Jewish Committee until 1918. In that year, Magnes resigned when the Committee rejected any connections between Jews and Bolshevism and supported President Woodrow Wilson's desire to intervene in Russia. Pro- and anti-Bolshevik newspapers used his resignation to support their views. The New York Tribune used his resignation to write the headline "Bolshevik Talk Forces Magnes Out," and the Chicago Yidisher Kurier used it to criticize the American Jewish Committee.

=== Antisemitic articles in the Dearborn Independent ===
In the June 12th edition of the Dearborn Independent, which was owned by Henry Ford, in 1920, the front page asked "The Jewish Question – Fact of Fancy?" The issue was focused on the "new" German Jewish community, whom the articles accused of tribalism and causing misfortune; the article received backlash from American Jewish press. The antisemitic articles of the Dearborn Independent were later compiled into an anthology by the Dearnborn Publishing Company titled, The International Jew: The World's Foremost Problem, which was met by outrage from the Louis Marshall and Cyrus Adler, members of the American Jewish Committee. The committee made its first formal response in November 1920 by publishing a pamphlet titled The "Protocols" Bolshevism and Jews: An Address to Their Fellow-Citizens by American Jewish Organizations.

== See also ==
- Red Scare
- First Red Scare
- McCarthyism
