= Frederic René Coudert II =

Frederic R. Coudert, Jr. (1871–1955) was an American lawyer and partner of Coudert Brothers international law firm in New York.

== Education and Coudert Brothers--Specialty in Constitutional Law ==
Coudert attended Columbia University where he earned his A.B. (1890 or before), his law degree in 1891, and a Doctor of Philosophy in political science in 1894. In 1890 he joined Coudert Brothers as a partner being admitted to the New York Bar in 1892. He specialized in constitutional law and led the firm's involvement in landmark Supreme Court cases on foreign territories, such as the Insular Cases following the Spanish-American War. He would go on to manage the firm's Paris office, established in 1879 —the first by a U.S. law firm abroad—facilitating Franco-American corporate expansions and representing clients like the Rothschild family in estate and investment matters.

== Role in the Spanish-American War of 1898--Uniform ==
Coudert was a First Lieutenant and a Guardsman with New York's Squadron A, volunteering for federal service when the U.S. Military went to war with Spain in 1898. He led Troop A of the New York Volunteer Cavalry to Puerto Rico, stepping in as commander on June 1 when Captain Howard G. Badgley was ordered to the hospital and continued to command until return of the troop from Puerto Rico, September 10, 1898. First Lieutenant Coudert's Squadron A -- trousers, M1896 jacket, 1Lt shoulder boards, and service cap--are in the collection of the National Guard Association of the United States.

== Life ==
From 1915 to 1920 he served as special assistant Attorney General of the U.S., and from 1915 to 1920 he was a legal advisor to the British Embassy. Coudert served as a trustee of Columbia University from 1912 to 1954. He was a member of the American Institute of Criminal Law and Criminology, and served with Jane Addams on its Crime and Immigration Committee. Coudert wrote the book: Certainty and Justice; Studies of the Conflict Between Precedent and Progress in the Development of the Law (New York and London: D. Appleton & Co. 1913) Its chapters are compelling and timeless: "The Challenge to the Constitution," "What is the Matter with the Law?" "Jury Trial as an Instance of Constitutional Development" "Criminal procedure and the Constitution" "The Constitution and Our New Peoples; Citizens, Subjects, Nationals or Aliens," "The Law and Our Industrial Development. The Rule of Reason," "Perversion of Precedent. Stare Decisis. History Misinterpreted," "Aliens and the Progress of the Law," "Progress of International Law in Treatment of Political Crime," and "The Crisis of the Law. Professional Incompetency."

== Dedication of "Bear and Faun" ==
As President of the National Highways Protective Association, Coudert spoke, along with Parks Commissioner Cabot Ward, at the dedication ceremony on May 17, 1914 of the Alfred Lincoln Seligman sculpture known as "Bear and Faun" by Edgar Walter (1877–1938).

== Family ==
Coudert was born in 1871 to Frederic René Coudert (1832–1903) of New York and Elizabeth McCredy (1839–1925) of Philadelphia. He was one of four children and the only boy. In 1897 Coudert married Alice/Alys Tracy Wilmerding (1878–1962), a daughter of Ferdinand Suydam Wilmerding (1850–1877) and a granddaughter of Benjamin Tracy. Together they had four sons: Frederic René Coudert, Jr. (1898–1972); Benjamin Tracy Coudert (1901–); Ferdinand Wilmerding Coudert (1909–1997); and Alexis Carrel Coudert (1914–1980).
