= Gordon Spivack =

American lawyer

- Born: c. 1928; New Haven, Connecticut
- Died: August 6, 2000; New Haven, Connecticut
- Education: Yale University; Yale Law School
- Occupation: Antitrust lawyer

Gordon B. Spivack (c. 1928 – August 6, 2000) was a prominent American antitrust lawyer and former senior Justice Department official. As a lawyer for Coudert Brothers and earlier for the firm of Lord Day & Lord, both now defunct, Spivack's roster of clients included some of the nation's biggest companies, including Cargill, Chevron Corporation, Coca-Cola, Texas Utilities and Union Carbide.

Born in New Haven, Spivack graduated from Yale University in 1950. After graduation, he joined the United States Army, becoming a sergeant first class in the Army's medical corps. In 1952 Spivack returned to New Haven, to enroll in Yale Law School, from which he graduated first in the class of 1955. He then joined the Justice Department's antitrust division ultimately rising to its top career position as Director of Operations where he supervised 350 trial attorneys. Among his many accomplishments at the Division was his work as the government's lead lawyer when it sued executives at General Electric and Westinghouse in 1960, accusing them of fixing the price of large electrical generators. His work and advocacy at the Division was central to the consideration of price fixing and bid rigging as serious crimes warranting jail time.

In the year 1967, Spivack returned to Yale Law School as a professor of antitrust law and civil procedure. Three years later, however, Lord Day & Lord hired him to start their antitrust group. In 1986, Spivack took himself, 17 other lawyers and all of his clients to Coudert Brothers. While in private practice, Spivack represented many major corporations in significant cases and investigations. In one famous case, Hunt v. Mobil Oil Co., his cross-examination at trial (before Judge Weinfeld) of Nelson Bunker Hunt led to a judgment in favor of his client, Standard Oil of California and all the other major oil companies. In 1978, he was appointed to serve on the President's Commission for the Revision of Antitrust Law and Procedures.

He died of colon cancer at his home in New Haven at age 71.
