= Archibald E. Stevenson =

American lawyer

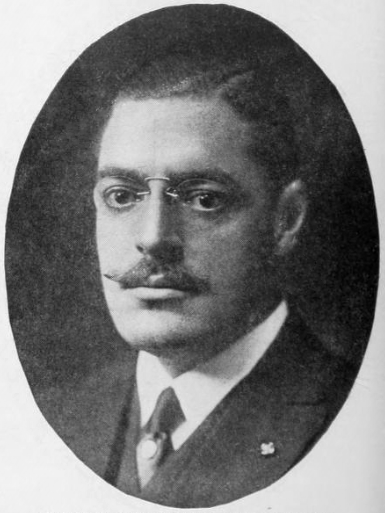
- Born: Archibald Ewing Stevenson; September 23, 1884; Uniontown, Pennsylvania, US
- Died: February 10, 1961 (aged 76); New Canaan, Connecticut, US
- Education: New York University; New York Law School
- Occupation: Lawyer
- Spouse: Katherine De La Vergne (m. 1910)
- Children: 3

Archibald Ewing Stevenson (September 23, 1884 – February 10, 1961) was an American attorney and legislative researcher. Stevenson is best remembered for his work as Assistant Counsel of the Lusk Committee of the New York State Senate from 1919 to 1920, the activities of which led to a series of sensational raids and trials of self-professed revolutionary socialists. Stevenson was also the de facto author and editor of the committee's four-volume report, which anticipated congressional investigations of communism conducted in subsequent years.

== Biography ==
=== Early years ===
Archibald Ewing Stevenson was born September 23, 1884, in Uniontown, Pennsylvania, located in the rural western part of the state. Stevenson's father was a noted geologist and a professor at New York University. He was raised as a Presbyterian and later in life was a member of Fifth Avenue Presbyterian Church of New York City.

The precocious Stevenson was a published author at the age of nine, composing a travel memoir called From New York to Alaska and Back Again.

Stevenson graduated from New York University with a Bachelor of Science degree in 1904, graduating first in his class. Following graduation Stevenson began to follow in his father's footsteps, teaching at NYU as an instructor of mineralogy following graduation. In 1908 Stevenson was placed in charge of the Department of Geology at NYU.

The appeal of science did not hold Stevenson's interest and he studied law in his free time, graduating from New York Law School with a law degree in 1909. He passed the New York State Bar exam in 1910 and was admitted to practice, forming a partnership called Graham & Stevenson. That same year, Stevenson married Katherine De La Vergne, with whom he had three daughters born in 1911, 1915 and 1919.

In this interval Stevenson was a member of a number of prominent legal and scientific societies, including the New York Academy of Science, the Seismological Society of America, the New York County Lawyers Association, the Sons of the Revolution, and Delta Phi fraternity. Stevenson was also active with the National Vacation Bible School Association, serving as the chairman of the committee for metropolitan New York City in 1915.

=== Professional anti-radical ===
When the United States entered World War I in the spring of 1917, Stevenson made the move from volunteer work in youth religious education and social work on the New York City's Lower East Side to official patriotic activity. Stevenson was tapped to head the Committee on Aliens of the mayor of New York's Committee on National Defense. This new activity inspired Stevenson to volunteer his services to the U.S. Justice Department in 1917, assisting it in its investigation of so-called "German propaganda." Stevenson began creating a card file indexing the names of individuals in the country whom he suspected of pro-German sympathies and worked in close connection with the War Department's Military Intelligence Division, based in New York City.

Stevenson was neither a special agent of the Justice Department's Bureau of Investigation, nor a member of Military Intelligence, but was rather an activist who cooperated with both as a member of the American Protective League, a non-government agency. On August 31, 1918, Stevenson learned the efficacy of the tactic of raiding one's political opponents when he and the American Protective League helped federal agents armed with a search warrant storm the New York headquarters of the National Civil Liberties Bureau, forerunner of the American Civil Liberties Union. Publications, documents, and minutes of the organization's governing body were seized for future scrutiny for potential prosecution.

On January 21, 1919, Stevenson was catapulted into national prominence by an appearance before the so-called Overman Committee of the United States Senate, which was then engaged in the first congressional investigation of "alien propaganda" and Bolshevism in America. During the course of his testimony, Stevenson read into the record a list of 62 names of individuals who held, in his own estimation, "dangerous, destructive, and anarchistic sentiments." Included among these were social worker and pacifist Jane Addams, President of Stanford University David Starr Jordan, journalist Oswald Garrison Villard, Sociology professor Frederic C. Howe, and an array of liberal clerics and academics.

Stevenson's testimony, an early example of a tactic later known as Red-baiting, became national news. With the Wilson administration embarrassed by the characterization of a number of its prominent friends in such a light, Secretary of War Newton D. Baker quickly entered the debate, declaring:

Mr. Stevenson has never been an officer or an employee of the Military Intelligence Division of the War Department.... I personally have no sympathy with the publication of lists of persons classified with reference to their supposed opinions, and grouped under general designations, such as "pacifists," which may mean any one of a dozen things, some of them quite consistent with the finest loyalty to the country and some of them inconsistent with such loyalty.

The attack on Stevenson by liberal critics drew conservative supporters to his defense, including U.S. Senator Lee Slater Overman, who proclaimed in committee that Stevenson had studied "German propaganda" in America for over a year and was thus "probably more familiar with the various groups of German and radical propaganda in the United States than anyone else in this country."

Though his influence at the War Department had attenuated, Stevenson still exerted considerable influence as a member of the powerful conservative Union League Club, a patriotic organization organized at the time of the American Civil War. On January 9, 1919, a meeting of that influential social organization of New York City's political elite determined to establish a committee of five members given the task of studying radicalism in the city. Archibald Stevenson was named by the organization to head this new committee. The committee conducted a two-month investigation before presenting its report at the March 13 monthly meeting of the group. Upon hearing the report, the membership of the group voted unanimously to petition the New York state legislature to appoint a special committee dedicated to the radicalism question.

Such a push did not come to the legislature out of the blue. During the course of his activity with the Union League Club anti-radicalism committee, Stevenson had frequently found himself in the New York state capital of Albany. There he met with state Republican political leaders, ultimately resulting in the creation of a state legislative committee to study radicalism in New York state – a committee headed by State Senator Clayton R. Lusk.

=== Lusk Committee service ===
Title page of the first volume of Lusk Committee's 4000-page report (1920), written and edited by Archibald Stevenson

On March 20, 1919, at the behest of Archibald Stevenson and the New York Union League Club, Republican State Senator Walters introduced a resolution creating a formal sub-committee of the Senate on "Bolsheviki Activities." This proposal quickly passed the Senate and was sent to the New York State Assembly, which approved the measure on March 26 by a vote of 110 to 10. An appropriation of $30,000 was passed to fund the committee's activities.

A joint committee consisting of four Senators and five Assemblymen was appointed, with majority control in the hands of the Republican Party. Senator Clayton Lusk was elected chairman. The committee was formally established with a limited purview, "to investigate the scope, tendencies, and ramifications" of "seditious activities" and to report on its investigations of the same back to the legislature. Nowhere in its authorizing legislation was this committee given the power to conduct raids or to make arrests. Rather, the committee was designed to be merely administrative in nature.

In practice, the Lusk Committee's activity extended significantly beyond its prescribed agenda and it ran appreciably over budget – spending some $80,000 by January 1920. The committee exercised search warrants against many of the organizations which it deemed to be centers of revolutionary propaganda, confiscating documents for further use.

The Lusk Committee met for the first time on June 12, 1919. That same day the office of the Russian Soviet Government Bureau, the unrecognized diplomatic office of Soviet Russia, located at 110 West 40th Street in New York City, was raided by police authorities working in conjunction with the Lusk Committee. A mass of books, letters, and papers were seized in accordance with the search warrant, providing the Lusk Committee with fodder for further investigation. A set of subpoenas from the committee to leading members of the Russian Soviet Government Bureau, including Ludwig Martens, A. A. Heller, Gregory Weinstein, Isaac Hourwich, and Santeri Nuorteva.

A second sensational raid directed by the Lusk Committee followed on June 21, 1919, when officers of the state constabulary and members of the American Protective League entered the premises of "The People's House," headquarters of the Rand School of Social Science on East 15th Street. Fifty raiders led by Deputy Attorney General Samuel A. Berger and Stevenson seized correspondence and other documents belonging to the Socialist Party-related school.

In 1920, McAlister Coleman described Stevenson, his ideological opponent:

Mr. Stevenson is conventional and sincere. Anyone who talks with him for five minutes will appreciate his sincerity. He sees himself as one of the saviors of American institutions, now threatened by the menace of a foreign philosophy. He believes with all his heart and soul that there is a widespread plot in this country to overthrow the Republic by violent means.... He is convinced that the Socialist Party of America is dominated by the "foreign element" and that its teachings are consequently "un-American." "Americanism" in Mr. Stevenson's mind, is largely determined by an individual's uncritical acceptance of the late war and war spirit.

With such a background, Mr. Stevenson spent three years studying and exposing the extremes of radicalism, and he has succeeded in persuading a large part of the public that the dream-world of plots and counterplots, revolutions, and assassinations through which he moves, actually exists.

Stevenson was the principal author of the committee's final report, Revolutionary Radicalism: Its History, Purpose and Tactics with an Exposition and Discussion of the Steps being Taken and Required to Curb It. Of its 4,000 pages, ten percent represented the committee's findings, the rest reprinted documents gathered during the committee's investigations that detailed revolutionary propaganda and patriotism education. Critics viewed Stevenson as the driving force behind the committee and the report. The New Republic believed the Report reflected Stevenson's earlier work in the Department of Military Intelligence because it described efforts to keep the U.S. out of World War I as the work of Socialist propagandists and identified pacifism with Bolshevism, which it called "a thoroughly dishonest attempt to mislead the reader."

=== Later years ===
In 1920 Stevenson served as counsel to the committee of the State Assembly that recommended the expulsion of its five Socialist members.

Following termination of the Lusk Committee, Stevenson remained for a time in the news as a prominent conservative public intellectual. Reflecting the national consensus even after the Red Scare of 1919-20, he continued to defend the limitations on free speech established during the war by the Espionage Act of 1917 and Sedition Act of 1918. Reviewing Zachariah Chafee's Freedom of Speech for the New York Times, Stevenson wrote:

The danger does not come from small groups which seek to use the torch and bomb, but rather from those quasi-political and economic organizations which teach that the workers should organize into revolutionary industrial unions for the purpose of using the coercive power of the general strike as a means to enable an organized minority to veto the decisions of the ballot box and to impose its will upon the American people. If to prevent the teaching of such a doctrine be an infringement of constitutional rights, it would also be an infringement of such rights to prevent the establishment of schools for the training of pickpockets, safebreakers and other criminals. The first duty of any Government is to protect itself. The sedition statutes...are destined for that purpose and do not abridge the civil liberties of the people.

In April 1921 Stevenson protested New York City's organized "Town Hall Forum" of public lectures as "spineless" and "indeterminate" for failing to oppose revolutionary propaganda. Stevenson also publicly opined that American colleges, universities, and seminaries were showing signs of increasing hospitality to radical ideas. Time magazine described him in 1923 as "the most indefatigable prosecutor of the Reds in America, and the brains of the Lusk Committee."

Following the enactment of a law regulating educational institutions and teachers, as recommended by the Lusk Report, in 1921-22 Stevenson served on the State Advisory Council on the Qualification of Teachers.

In 1927, Stevenson published States' Rights and National Prohibition, in which he criticized national prohibition as "a part of the general movement to shift responsibility from the individual to the State" that will "end by destroying representative government." The book described the history of federal-state relations and warned that federal enforcement of national prohibition "involves a usurpation of the reserved powers of the States" and establishes a precedent for the surrender of their power to the national government. Reviews in some legal journals were brief and respectful, but Harvard Law Review published a review by Harvard Law Professor Thomas Reed Powell that said: "For unsupported assertions, for self-contradictions, for loose terminology, for non-sequiturs, for political foolishness, this book has few peers."

In the 1920s and 1930s, Stevenson was associated with the National Civic Federation, by then a small right-wing group. He chaired its Committee on Free Speech in 1927, when he delivered a radio address on the proper limitations on the free speech of employees. He said:

I refer to those cases...in which a teacher, professor or clergyman is called in question by his employer for his conduct in office. His personal liberty is usually not at stake. It is his salary that is threatened.... Apparently, whoever pays the individual's salary has no freedom whatever. The pay check must be drawn once a month even though the teacher, professor or clergyman refuses to teach or preach what he is paid to do. The employer has an unquestionable right to demand that he be given what he pays for. If the employee feels that this demand limits his academic freedom, he is free to resign and go elsewhere to express himself as he pleases.

Stevenson served as the National Civil Federation's general counsel from 1934 to 1936. In the latter year he decried Communist influence in American unions, designed "to encourage industrial unrest and thus bring about a change in the social order by violent means." In 1937 he joined a committee to lobby for the outlawing of sit-down strikes, tracing the tactic to Northern Italy in 1919 and 1920, where it led opponents of union radicals, in his view, to turn to Mussolini and fascism. He protested to Secretary of State Hull against a U.S.-Russian trade agreement and called on the FCC to ban broadcasts by the Communist candidates for president and vice-president during the 1936 presidential campaign.

During the early 1930s, Stevenson headed a small organization called the International Committee to Combat the World Menace of Communism. Later in the decade he worked as public relations counsel for the New York State Economic Council, a pro-business and anti-trade union organization.

In the mid-1930s, Stevenson returned to an issue from his days with the Lusk Committee and defended requiring teachers to take a loyalty oath. He argued that such oaths were meant "to raise teaching to the dignity of a recognized profession" similar to the oaths taken by public officials and the Hippocratic Oath.

Stevenson moved to New Canaan, Connecticut, in the 1930s and was active in local politics. He headed the town's Board of Finance from 1935 to 1940 and was first selectman in 1940. At a special town meeting in 1937, he led the movement to protest President Roosevelt's plan to enlarge the Supreme Court. He said it would "render insecure and valueless every constitutional guarantee.... Such a precedent would deliver into the hands of an ambitious President all the powers of government.... This is the road that was traveled by Adolf Hitler; it is the road of Mussolini and of every dictator throughout the whole course of history."

From 1942, Stevenson served as general counsel of the National Economic Council, another conservative economic organization dedicated to carrying on campaigns against communism and socialism.

=== Death ===
Archibald Stevenson died at his home in New Canaan, Connecticut, on February 10, 1961. He was 77 years old at the time of his death.

== See also ==
- Overman Committee
- Lusk Committee

== Works ==
- From New York to Alaska and Back Again. New York: Styles and Cash, 1893.
- Revolutionary Radicalism: Its History, Purpose and Tactics with an Exposition and Discussion of the Steps being Taken and Required to Curb It: Filed April 24, 1920, in the Senate of the State of New York. (Editor.) Published in 4 volumes, Albany, NY: Lyon, 1920.
  - Part 1: Revolutionary and Subversive Movements Abroad and At Home, Vol. 1.
  - Part 1: Revolutionary and Subversive Movements Abroad and At Home, Vol. 2.
  - Part 2: Constructive Movements and Measures in America, Vol. 3.
  - Part 2: Constructive Movements and Measures in America, Vol. 4.
- Correspondence Relative to the Conduct of the Labor Temple, 14th Street and 2nd Avenue, New York City. With Jesse Franklin Forbes. New York: n.p., n.d. [c. 1921].
- States' Rights and National Prohibition. New York: Clark, Boardman, 1927.
- New England in Washington's Day. New Canaan, CT: John E. Hersam, 1929.
- What Kind of Social and Political Philosophy is Taught in the Schools? An Address by Archibald E. Stevenson of the New York Bar, Delivered before the Citizens' and Taxpayers' Conference on Quality and Cost of Public Education, Held at Hotel Ten Eyck, Albany, N.Y., February 5, 1940. New York: New York State Economic Council, n.d. [1940].
- Revolution through "Social Science" in the Schools. With Augustin G Rudd and Merwin Kimball Hart. New York: American Parents Committee on Education, n.d. [c. 1940].
- Forging Another Link in the Chain: The Pending Bill to Put All Private Employment Agencies under Washington Bureaucratic Control (H.R. 5510): A Statement Made Before the executive committee of the New York State Economic Council, October 29, 1941. New York: New York State Economic Council, n.d. [1941].
- Education for Citizenship. New York: New York State Economic Council, n.d. [1941].
- Bulwark of Freedom, the State and National Bills of Rights: An Address by Archibald E. Stevenson... New York: New York State Economic Council, 1942.
