= New York bar =

New York Bar or New York bar may refer to:

- New York State Bar Association
- New York City Bar Association, association of lawyers and law students
- Harry's New York Bar in Paris, formerly known as the New York Bar
- Taverns in New York City
