= Lurquin-Coudert =

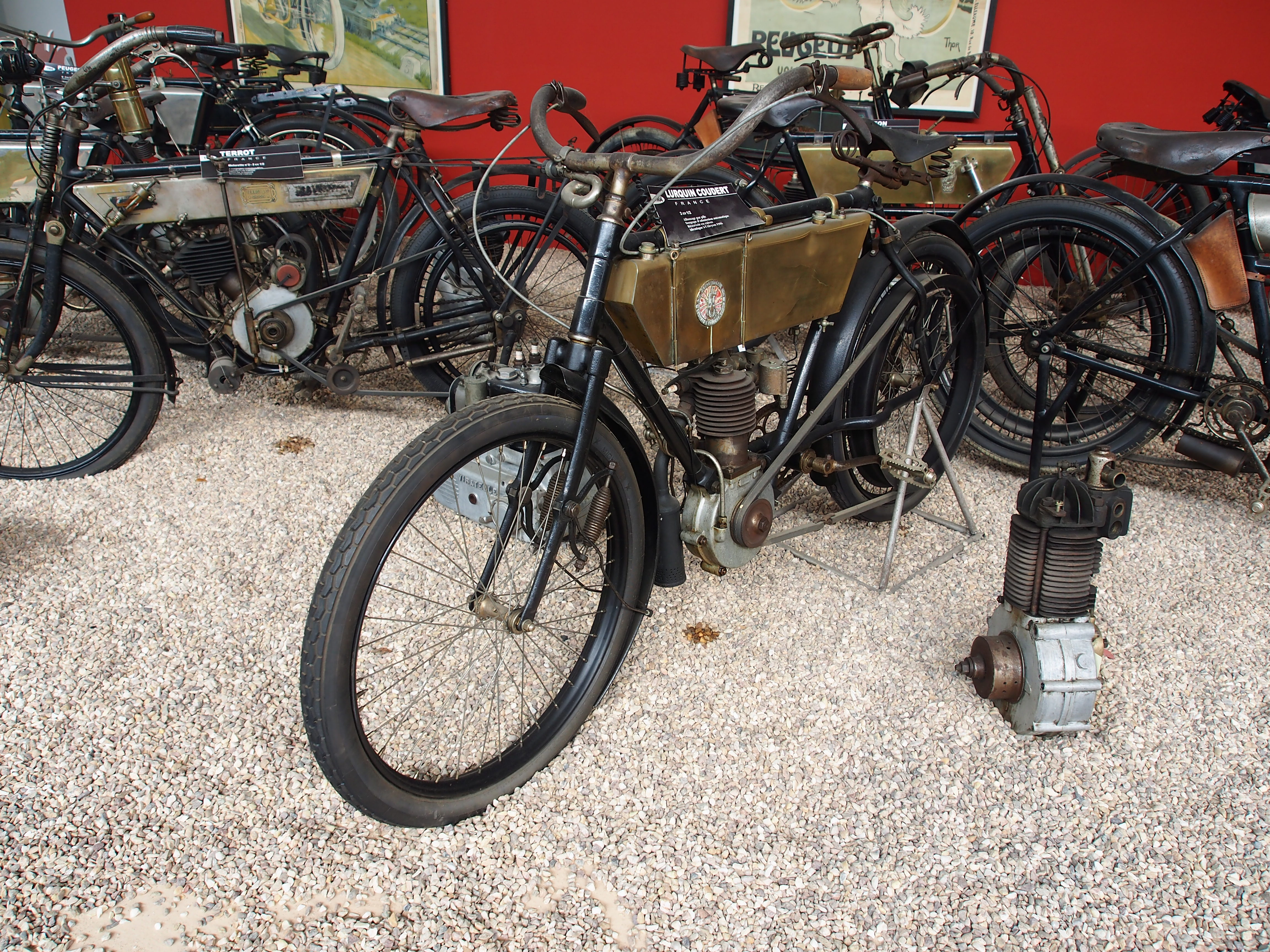
1904 Lurquin-Coudert, Musée de la Moto et du Vélo, Amnéville, France

The Lurquin-Coudert was a French automobile manufactured in Paris from 1906 (or 1907) until 1914. Produced by a maker of industrial engines, they were "voiturette-tricars"; a twin-cylinder ran in the touring class at the 1907 Château-Thierry hillclimb.

In 1911 they produced their first 4-wheeled cyclecar, badged as Coudert. It used a vee-twin 'Train' engine and belt drive until 1912, when a friction plate clutch and chain drive was introduced.
