= Frederic René Coudert Sr. =

American lawyer

Frederic R. Coudert
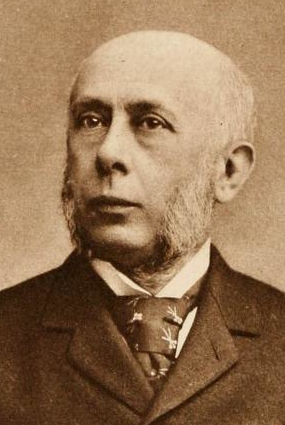

Personal details
- Born: March 1, 1832 New York City, U.S.
- Died: December 20, 1903 (aged 71) Washington, D.C., U.S.
- Party: Democratic
- Education: Columbia University (BA)

Frederic René Coudert Sr. (March 1, 1832 in New York City – December 20, 1903 in Washington, D. C.) was an American lawyer with Coudert Brothers.

== Life ==
His father Charles Coudert was French, and left France in 1824. Frederic graduated from Columbia College of Columbia University in 1850, and on his majority was admitted to practice in the courts. He was elected seventh president of the Association of the Bar of the City of New York. With his two brothers, Charles and Louis Leonce, he formed a law partnership. Charles's daughter Jeanne Clarisse, known as Clarisse, was the first wife of Condé Nast and the mother of Charles Coudert Nast.

His firm had foreign branches and handled a large volume of patent, trade-mark, and extradition cases. He was a delegate of the New York Chamber of Commerce to the Antwerp conference called to revise the rules of general average, and in 1880 was a member of the International Conference at Berne, for codification of the law of nations.

He consented in 1876 to visit Louisiana for the purpose of urging the Returning Board to act justly, respecting election returns which were to determine the presidential succession. In 1892 and again in 1893 he was a prominent opponent of the courses taken by his own political party.

In 1876 Coudert spoke at the unveiling (done by Bartholdi himself) of the statue of General Lafayette in Union Square Park. The sculpture is facing that of George Washington. Coudert later assisted in bringing the Statue of Liberty (also by Bartholdi) to New York (1885).

During the controversy concerning American and British seal fisheries in the Bering Sea, (Bering Sea Arbitration tribunal in Paris in 1893), Coudert acted as legal adviser for the United States Government arguing for protection of the Arctic seals. In 1896 he was appointed by President Cleveland a member of the commission to investigate and report on the boundary dispute between Venezuela and British Guiana. He was uniquely qualified for the position, being fluent in French, English, Italian and Spanish; he was also gifted with a ready and caustic wit.

In 1897, he and his son Frederic René Coudert II, known as "Fred," became the first pair of father and son lawyers to argue cases before the U.S. Supreme court in a single day.

Coudert served as commissioner of public schools of New York City in 1883-84, was president of the Columbia University Alumni Association, and from 1890 until 1901, a trustee of the University. He declined the Russian mission, a judgeship of the Court of Appeals of the State of New York, and a justiceship of the Supreme Court of the United States. He accepted (as the only public office he ever held) unsalaried membership in the Board of Education of the City of New York. From 1889 to 1899, he was president of the Manhattan Club, a social club of prominent members of the Democratic Party. He had three daughters and a son, Frederic René Coudert II. (Feb 11, 1871 - 1955).
