= Coudert Brothers =

American law firm

Coudert Brothers LLP
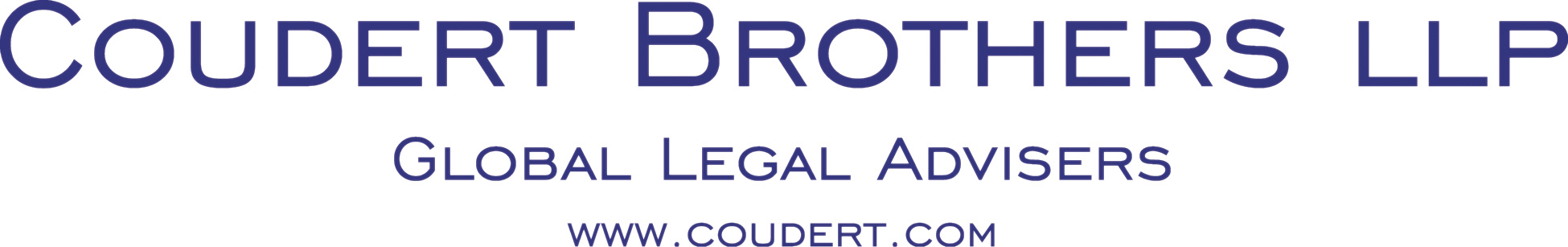
- Headquarters: New York City
- No. of offices: 28
- No. of attorneys: 650
- Major practice areas: General practice
- Revenue: —
- Date founded: 1853 (New York City)
- Founder: Frederic René Coudert Sr. Charles Coudert Jr. Louis Leonce Coudert
- Company type: Defunct
- Dissolved: 2006
- Website: Defunct

Coudert Brothers LLP was a New York–based law firm that practiced from 1853 until its dissolution in 2006.

== History ==
The firm was established in 1853 in New York by three sons of Charles Coudert Sr.: Frederic René Coudert Sr., Charles Coudert Jr., and Louis Leonce Coudert, and specialized in international law.

The firm represented private investors seeking to acquire rights to build the Panama Canal; French automotive and tire manufacturers opening plants in the U.S.; the governments of Russia, France, and Great Britain in the buildup to World War I; and Ford Motor Company and a group of foreign car manufacturers in the successful appeal of the Selden Patent Case, ending the attempted monopolization of the automotive industry. The firm prospered under three generations of family control, expanding from its start in New York City to 28 offices worldwide, including Paris, London, Moscow, Sydney, Tokyo, Los Angeles, and Shanghai. Coudert partners dealt with financiers, presidents, and ambassadors in settling cases of corporate ownership worldwide, acting as confidential facilitators of Allied arms buying in World War I, and as interventionist supporters in World War II.

In 1986, Coudert Brothers hired Gordon Spivack, a former Yale Law School professor who oversaw the multimillion-dollar antitrust practice at the law firm of Lord Day & Lord. Spivack took 17 lawyers to Coudert Brothers, plus clients like the Coca-Cola Company.

== Dissolution ==
Though American Lawyer magazine ranked it "among the 100 highest-grossing firms in the United States" in 2004, it was dissolved in 2005 after failing to reach a merger agreement with another firm, Baker & McKenzie.

The breakup of Coudert Brothers was long in coming. In 2004, the firm had profits of only $410,000 per partner—among the lowest in big law firms. Coudert Brothers took a significant hit when Orrick, Herrington & Sutcliffe recruited 11 partners from its London and Moscow offices, effectively ending its presence there. Orrick also acquired Coudert's valuable offices in China. Most of the New York office joined Baker & McKenzie, greatly expanding its New York operations. In Paris, the office split to both Orrick and the Philadelphia-based firm Dechert. In Brussels, Antwerp, Singapore, and Tokyo, DLA Piper and Mayer Brown welcomed new attorneys from Coudert. Additionally, some of the lawyers in Almaty and St. Petersburg became the foundation for new offices for Chadbourne & Parke in those areas. The Bangkok office switched to Hunton & Williams. Specialized departments started their own law firms, such as the Middle East Practice Group based in Frankfurt which set up MIDEAST LAW | Lawyers | Avocats | Rechtsanwälte.

One reason for the decline of Coudert Brothers was the rise of other competitive multinational law firms in the 1990s and 2000s, such as Clifford Chance, White & Case, and Baker & McKenzie. Many of Coudert's offices were relatively costly, unproductive, and conservative in billing, which made their profits (and therefore the income of their partner attorneys) weaker than other firms. The firm also had redundant offices, such as three offices in the San Francisco Bay Area and a generalist approach that competed poorly with more specialized practices of other firms.

On September 22, 2006, Coudert Brothers filed for bankruptcy. This led to a flurry of litigation, including allegations of malpractice and that overseas lawyers sequestered firm money from creditors. There was also debate over payments made to partners during the final months of the firm's operations possibly constituting fraudulent transfers. As of 2016, litigation concerning the acquisition by Orrick of Coudert's Chinese offices was still ongoing, leading one judge to dub Coudert "the longest-lived dead law firm in the Western World."

== Notable attorneys ==
- Charles Frederic Adams argued before the Supreme Court, on behalf of the Coudert Brothers, with respect to the important "Insular Cases" then before the Court.
- Gary Hart
- Stephen Schulhofer (born 1942), Professor of Law at the University of Pennsylvania Law School and NYU Law School

== See also ==
- Frederic René Coudert Sr.
