= Lusk Committee =

Investigation of radicalism in 1919–1920

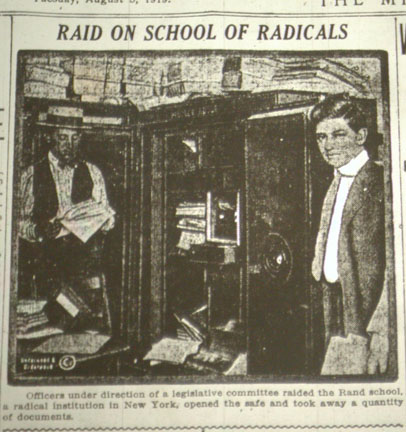
The Lusk Committee raided the Rand School of Social Science in August 1919 and seized documents to fuel its investigations.

The Joint Legislative Committee to Investigate Seditious Activities, popularly known as the Lusk Committee, was formed in 1919 by the New York State Legislature to investigate individuals and organizations in New York State suspected of sedition.

== Organizational history ==
=== Investigative phase ===
A private, two-month-long investigation of radicalism conducted by a committee of the New York City Union League Club produced a unanimous vote of the club's members to petition the New York State Legislature for a government investigation.

Within days, the New York State Legislature established the Joint Legislative Committee to Investigate Seditious Activities by Concurrent Resolution on March 26, 1919. The nine-member Committee targeted offenses committed under the criminal anarchy articles of the State's Penal Code. The committee was chaired by freshman State Senator Clayton R. Lusk of Cortland County who had a background in business and conservative political values, referring to radicals as "alien enemies." With the exception of a minor case, this was the first time that the state's criminal anarchy statutes had been invoked since they were enacted in 1902 following the assassination of United States President William McKinley by an anarchist in Buffalo, New York.

For more than a year the Committee gathered information on suspected radical groups by raiding offices and examining documents, infiltrating meetings, assisting law enforcement agents in thousands of arrests, and subpoenaing witnesses to testify at the committee's hearings. The committee's use of search warrants and raids was an exceptional departure from legislative practice. It also had the cooperation of local police departments and prosecutors to enable it to operate aggressively despite its limited budget.

The committee and the federal government's Bureau of Investigation, forerunner of the FBI, cooperated by sharing information, interrogation expertise, and informants. Rayme W. Finch, formerly an agent in the Bureau's New York office, became the committee's chief investigator. This cooperation allowed federal authorities whose powers were limited by the lack of a peacetime anti-sedition statute to use state authority against radicals.

On June 12, the police and private detectives working for the Committee raided the Russian Soviet Bureau, an agency headed by Ludwig Martens, that sought American recognition of the new Bolshevik government. Some of those arrested were immediately interrogated by the Committee about Soviet propaganda in the U.S. and other witnesses quoted from seized documents to demonstrate that the Russian Bureau aimed at the violent overthrow of the government. A second raid on the Rand School, an institution that espoused the peaceful evolution of socialism and taught history, economics, and English language skills, followed. Among the documents seized was a large volume of birth control literature. While the press had demonstrated little sympathy for the Russian Bureau, the liberal and radical press, joined by the American Civil Liberties Union (ACLU), defended the Rand School. Others raids targeted the left wing of the Socialist Party and the IWW. When they analyzed the materials it hauled away, it made much of attempts to organize American Negroes and calls for revolutions in foreign-language magazines. The committee's agents raided 73 branches of the newly organized Communist party on November 8, a Saturday evening when the radicals would be celebrating the anniversary of the Bolshevik Revolution. They raided the offices of dozens of radical publications as well. Most of the literature obtained in the raids was available for sale in bookstores. Raids in upstate cities followed, including Buffalo, Utica, and Rochester, and then on the offices of Communist newspapers in New York City.

=== The Lusk Report and its aftermath ===
The committee's investigation officially ended when it submitted its final report with recommendations to the legislature in April 1920. The report, published as Revolutionary Radicalism: Its History, Purpose and Tactics with an Exposition and Discussion of the Steps being Taken and Required to Curb It, ran to more than 4,000 pages. De facto editor of the report was Archibald E. Stevenson, Assistant Counsel of the committee, whom critics asserted "directed its activities from the start."

Only ten percent of the four volume work constituted a report, while the rest reprinted materials seized in raids or supplied by witnesses, much of it detailing European activities, or surveyed efforts to counteract radicalism in every state, including citizenship programs and other patriotic educational activities.

The committee's work led to the conviction on charges of criminal anarchy of two anarchist editors, who were sentenced to years in prison and other radical immigrants were deported. As a result of the committee's work, five Socialist Party members of the legislature were expelled in 1920. It produced a negative reaction on the part of the press and the public that helped change national attitudes against the anti-red campaign of 1919–20.

The legislature considered the committee's recommendations for curbing and countering radical propaganda. It passed a series of laws funding anti-radical work by the Attorney-General and the training of teachers of patriotism who would use their expertise in factories and businesses. Other bills defined the kinds of institutions that could provide education and forbade private instruction outside them. Another required public school teachers take loyalty oaths Governor Al Smith vetoed the legislation, objecting in particular to government power over instruction. He called the legislation's supporters "prejudiced," "hysterical," and "mainly interested in the control of liberal thought." His veto of the school licensing bill said: "The safety of this government rests upon the reasoned and devoted loyalty of its people. It does not need for its defense a system of intellectual tyranny, which, in the endeavor to choke error by force must of necessity crush truth as well." The legislature passed the same bills again after Smith left office, and Republican Governor Nathan L. Miller signed them on May 12, 1921.

Smith was re-elected in November 1922. The Lusk laws were repealed early in 1923 and an attempt to prosecute the Rand School for operating an educational institution without a license was suspended. Writing in the September 1921 issue of Current Opinion, Lusk described his Committee's work as "repression carried on by and with the consent of the vast majority in the interests of that majority" and explained his belief that " a reasonable and wise repression of revolutionary activities tends toward the maintenance of law, order and peace in the community."

== See also ==
- California Senate Factfinding Subcommittee on Un-American Activities
- House Un-American Activities Committee
- Palmer Raids

== Bibliography ==
Notes

References

- Brown, Roscoe C. E.; Smith, Ray B.; Johnson, Willis F.; et al. (1922). History of the State of New York: Political and Government: Vol. 4: 1896–1920. Syracuse Press.
- Jaffe, Julian F. (1972). Crusade Against Radicalism: New York During the Red Scare, 1914–1924. Port Washington, NY: Kennikat Press. ISBN 9780804690263. - Total pages: 265
- New-York Tribune (July 17, 1919). "Reds Work in the South". New-York Tribune. New York. pp. 1–20. ISSN 1941-0646. OCLC 9405688.
- Archibald E. Stevenson (ed.) Revolutionary Radicalism: Its History, Purpose and Tactics with an Exposition and Discussion of the Steps being Taken and Required to Curb It: Filed April 24, 1920, in the Senate of the State of New York, Published in 4 volumes, Albany, NY: Lyon, 1920.
  - Part 1: Revolutionary and Subversive Movements Abroad and At Home, Vol. 1.
  - Part 1: Revolutionary and Subversive Movements Abroad and At Home, Vol. 2.
  - Part 2: Constructive Movements and Measures in America, Vol. 3.
  - Part 2: Constructive Movements and Measures in America, Vol. 4.
