= Unconventional warfare (United States) =

United States military doctrine

In US military doctrine, unconventional warfare (UW) is one of the core activities of irregular warfare. Unconventional warfare is essentially support provided by the military to a foreign insurgency or resistance. The legal definition of UW is:

Unconventional Warfare consists of activities conducted to enable a resistance movement or insurgency to coerce, disrupt or overthrow an occupying power or government by operating through or with an underground, auxiliary or guerrilla force in a denied area.

== U.S. Department of Defense UW mission ==
UW was the first mission assigned to United States Army Special Forces when they were formed in 1952; they now have additional missions, including foreign internal defense (FID). In the United States, "special forces" refers specifically to the United States Army Special Forces (SF), as opposed to the usage in most other countries, where "special forces" refers to the range of unit types that the U.S. calls "special operations forces" controlled by the United States Special Operations Command (USSOCOM). SF units are tasked with seven primary missions:

- unconventional warfare (United States Department of Defense doctrine) (UW)
- foreign internal defense (FID)
- special reconnaissance (SR)
- direct action (DA)
- counterterrorism (CT)
- counter-proliferation (CP)
- psychological operations (United States) (PSYOP)
- information operations (IO)

SF may be given other missions including warfare and support, combat search and rescue (CSAR), security assistance, peacekeeping, humanitarian assistance, humanitarian demining and counter-drug operations; other USSOCOM units or other U.S. government activities may be the specialists in these secondary areas.

The UW mission assumes that U.S. forces will work with troops in another country and possibly with other allies and is always multinational. Depending on the particular situation, their role may vary from pure training to leading a joint force in combat. Over more than fifty years, roles and missions have continued to evolve, based on the history of operations.

=== History ===
The idea of UW came from Second World War resistance movements assisted by U.S. personnel, especially against the Empire of Japan's invasion of the Philippines as well as numerous European national resistance against the invasion by Nazi Germany. The main strength of these movements came not from U.S., but local personnel. U.S. "behind the lines" units such as Merrill's Marauders, in modern doctrine, were not conducting UW but DA and SR. The idea extended to resistance against an expected Soviet invasion of Europe following World War II. Rarely, however, did the U.S. create a guerrilla force. Far more often, the U.S. supported an existing national organization.

==== World War II ====
A variety of organizations, including United States personnel, conducted UW missions. Many of the operations in the European Theater of Operations (ETO) were multinational, such as Jedburgh teams, which usually were composed of three soldiers, one from the U.S., one from the U.K., and one from France.

The earliest US soldiers involved in UW were in the Philippines, soon allied with Filipino forces, and who declined to follow Japanese orders to surrender, such as Wendell Fertig. While not trained in UW, Fertig, along with other U.S. and Filipino leaders, eventually created guerrilla forces fighting the Japanese, forces that numbered in the tens of thousands. A few experienced soldiers' ability to train and lead a quite large resistance was a guiding principle of the formation of United States Army Special Forces in 1952.

==== 1950s model of resistance to invasion of Europe ====
After World War II, the original SF mission of UW, as shown in the first SF deployment of the 10th Special Forces Group to Europe, was in expectation of a Soviet attack on Western Europe. SF would help organize, train, and lead resistance movements to such an invasion. A 1951 doctrine for UW, still called guerrilla warfare at that point, was:

Guerilla Warfare is defined. As operations carried out by small independent forces, generally in the rear of the enemy, with the objective of harassing, delaying, and disrupting the enemy's military operations. The term is sometimes limited to the military operations and tactics of small forces whose objective is to inflict casualties and damage on the enemy rather than seize or defend terrain; these operations are characterized by the extensive use of surprise and the emphasis on the avoidance of casualties. The term ... includes organized and directed passive resistance, espionage, assassination, sabotage and propaganda, and, in some cases, ordinary combat. Guerilla warfare is normally carried on by irregular, or partisan forces; however, regular forces that have been cut off behind enemy lines or infiltrated into the enemy rear areas may use guerilla tactics.

— 1951 version of U.S. Army guerrilla warfare manual cited in

==== 1960s model of dealing with wars of national liberation ====
When American advisors were sent to Laos and South Vietnam in the fifties and early sixties, the major problem was not to create guerrilla units, but to fight existing Laotian and Vietnamese guerrilla forces. To them it seemed logical that soldiers trained to be guerrillas would have a deep understanding of how to fight guerrillas, so Special Forces were given that mission. The White Star mission in Laos was initially covert, and used Special Forces and other personnel under Central Intelligence Agency control. Whether the mission is called counterguerrilla, counterinsurgency, or foreign internal defense, it involves assisting a friendly government—the "foreign" in FID—to defend against guerrillas acting inside its borders. FID can also involve training a foreign government to deal with a future internal guerrilla threat.

Later in Southeast Asia, SF personnel, often assigned to the Studies and Observation Group, carried out SR missions against infiltrators from the North, directing air strikes and assessing damage.

==== 1970s and 1980s ====
In the 1970s, until the NCA withdrew them as part of its "tilt" to Iraq, SF supported Kurdish resistance to Iraq under Saddam Hussein. In the 1980s, SF worked with the Afghan Mujahideen against the Soviets, but in a role of supporting rather than leading the local personnel. They did not need to create an underground and an auxiliary, and often supported the guerrillas from outside the area of operations. Parts of the Afghan resistance, supported by SF and CIA elements, later became hostile to the U.S.

==== 1990s ====
Following the 1990 Iraqi invasion of Kuwait, SF teams worked with the Kuwaiti resistance. When they can direct, using long-distance secure communications, air and missile strikes on targets, the guerrillas need not risk their limited resources in raids and ambushes. While U.S. special operations doctrine had conceived of guiding strikes, that was seen as being done directly by SF specialists. The evolving model would have SF UW trainers teach the guerrillas how to guide strikes against targets. Separating the means of destruction from the guerrillas not only makes them safer, but avoids the problem of "blowback" if the guerrillas later turn against the U.S.

==== 2000s ====
In the 2001 joint operations with the Afghan Northern Alliance, the SF teams with the Afghans provided the precision targeting information to air units, but did not operate in a SR mode, separate from the local force. The SR targeting function was performed, but in a UW support context rather than a separate U.S. operation.

SF produced intelligence for their own operations, for their supported regional command, and national-level authorities. "Arriving in their operational areas, SF cultivated relationships with local leaders citizens of the area, much as in the Balkans." Their mission was neither pure UW nor pure FID, but the intelligence preparation featured in the fifth step, Buildup, of the operational model.

== Evolution of the UW mission ==
In 1998, Gen. Peter J. Schoomaker, then USSOCOM commander and later Chairman of the Joint Chiefs of Staff told Robert E. Kelley "Unconventional warfare is not a viable mission for Special Forces. The only reason you train for unconventional warfare is because it is the best vehicle for maintaining your Special Forces skill set." Kelley also cites the October 1997 Army Special Forces Vision XXI as saying "Dissident elements are the key to UW mission potential in any region. As long as there are dissidents, there will be UW potential to support U.S. national interest."

Gen. Schoomaker, however, did use the term global scouts to describe the role that Special Forces have in "preparing the battlefield" before regular forces enter it. While the later stages of UN operations in Somalia suffered from overly ambitious goals resulting in the Battle of Mogadishu, SF teams preceded the United States Marine Corps unit that formed the first overt assistance force, and made contact with various clans whose cooperation was needed. Such contact falls into the early parts of the UW operational model, without moving into combat phases. Other than special reconnaissance, such information collection is not now listed as a basic SF mission. Kelley suggests that the SF UW doctrine be revised to include just such activity:

- Intelligence activities in a UW environment should be the first area addressed: Schoomaker's global scout role. This can fit into existing UW doctrine if it is understood the resistance may never need to engage in direct combat.
- Employment of subversion and sabotage needs to be made a priority, and updated. The update should emphasize that direct access and violent means may not be necessary if, for example, communications and computers can be disrupted by remote information operations.
- SF units already have assisted insurgencies as diverse as the Contras and Northern Alliance. A support, rather than leadership, role has not been formulated in SF UW doctrine.
- Complete the revision of UW doctrine to take a more modern view of guerrilla warfare, in contrast with the current model that emphasizes World War II-style leadership of rural partisans.

Kelley concluded that UW remains a viable mission, but the doctrine for it, as of 2000, is outdated. It has been relatively rare that U.S. forces, since World War II, actually trained and led a guerrilla force. They did so in Laos, but, in Afghanistan and elsewhere, they supported an existing rebel force. For example, UW missions were sometimes initiated by paramilitary personnel of the Central Intelligence Agency, sometimes with SF personnel on clandestine detail to the CIA. See CIA activities in Laos. Eventually, these UW forces came back under U.S. Army control. Later in the Vietnam War, SF-led units conducted offensive actions against opponents on the Ho Chi Minh Trail and other infiltration paths. Increasingly, SF personnel took on other missions, principally SR and DA.

In 1990–91, the UW mission supported intelligence collection, sabotage, and subversion by the Kuwaiti underground. UW had a major role, in 2001, of supporting the Northern Alliance in Afghanistan. UW experience is more of support to intelligence collection, subversion and sabotage by insurgents, and less one of direct combat through raids and ambushes. Current doctrine allows both; there may need to be a change of emphasis.

== Strategic role of UW ==
Unconventional warfare is a form of insurgency, which exploits grievances to influence or overthrow a government believed repressive by the supporters of the UW force. US doctrine assumes there will usually be a government in exile with which the UW plan can be developed. UW leaders must never forget that they are extending politics with military means, and that, in a guerrilla situation, their military means are limited. Successful UW always recognizes that its essence is political, not simply military. No warfare should ignore Carl von Clausewitz's dictum that "war is the extension of politics with the addition of other means". Subversion, psychological operations and other nonviolent means may be as potent as an ambush, in advancing the political goals of the UW force.

The U.S. doctrine for special operations emphasizes that commanders cannot dominate a politicomilitary environment in the same way in which a conventional force can exert "battlefield dominance." UW is conceptually at a strategic level, and its commanders must constantly remain aware of political goals such as "military successor defeat, a change in hostile strategy or tactics, or fluctuating levels of US support. They must know who the friendly and hostile decision makers are, what their objectives and strategies are, and how they interact. They must influence friendly decision makers to ensure they understand the implications of SO mission requirements and the consequences of not adequately supporting them."

=== Relationships with U.S. National Command ===
The ability to create or support resistance forces expands the range of options available to national leadership, filling a niche intermediate between diplomacy and all-out warfare. As the Cold War began, the focus was on Europe, but it began to expand. Faced the reality of wars of national liberation from the mid-fifties on, President John F. Kennedy gave the first public endorsement to special forces, as a means of countering communist expansion in the third world, a very different problem than the original UW concept of leading resistance movements after a Soviet invasion of Europe.

[W]e need to be prepared to fight a different war. This is another type of war, new in its intensity, ancient in its origin, war by guerilla, subversives, insurgents, assassins; war by ambush instead of combat, by infiltration instead of aggression, seeking victory by eroding and exhausting the enemy instead of engaging him and these are the challenges that will be before us in the next decade if freedom is to be saved, a whole new kind of strategy, a wholly different kind of force, and therefore a new and wholly different kind of military training.

— John F. Kennedy, speech at United States Military Academy, 1962

.

Operational SF personnel assigned to a Unified Combatant Command (UCC) or USSOCOM reports to the National Command Authority (NCA) of the United States (i.e., the President of the United States and the United States Secretary of Defense). Other national-level organizations, such as the United States Department of State or the Director of National Intelligence, may have a role in establishing policy for the UW operation, which is under the direct command of a joint organization made up of U.S. and government in exile personnel. Personnel qualified in the UW mission provided the NCA and UCC commanders with "a flexible, highly trained military force ready for small-scale, complex, high-risk missions inside hostile states. Throughout its history, SF's core purpose has been unconventional warfare (UW) and although light infantry and paramilitary units may employ UW tactics, SOF remain the only doctrinally trained UW experts".

=== UW as a source of intelligence ===
UW forces have intelligence capability for their own targeting, but also are major sources of intelligence to the commands they support, and to the national level of the United States and the supported government in exile. This is a two-way process; the higher headquarters can provide appropriate national-level intelligence and guidance on targeting, while the UW forces can conduct intelligence collection. The local forces have language and cultural skills to blend with an enemy while conducting reconnaissance. Underground and auxiliary forces can clandestinely emplace SIGINT and MASINT technical collection devices.

Intelligence operation pioneered during Special Forces operations in Bosnia and Kosovo continued their evolution during Afghanistan and Iraq. "Analysis of the operations conducted by Special Forces from the Balkans to OEF and OIF demonstrate a distinct trend away from the traditional "top-driven" intelligence, gathered and evaluated at higher command levels and disseminated to lower units, to a "bottom-driven" intelligence system based upon collection and exploitation of information at the user level. Intelligence organizations at higher command levels were not always organized to make the best use of SF-collected intelligence.

Direct effects of the COE include personnel and training changes resulting from the increased emphasis on ... intelligence and information technologies for SF to operate effectively in the joint, multinational, and interagency environment. Indirect effects of the COE include increases in command and control, combat support, and combat service support assets required to conduct multiple, sustained special operations globally.

=== SF, UW, and force multiplication ===
SF units are force multipliers. While SF have missions other than UW, UW can more impact when they can create a much larger force of guerrillas rather than trying to do everything themselves. An effective SF commander had the attitude, "Hey, we're all in this together with our Kurdish counterparts,"... Our commander and his counterpart ... were very close and like-minded, to the point that they would show up together for JSOTF coordination and planning meetings ... In fact, I would say that what they were seeing was genuine rapport and a real camaraderie. In our sector, the Kurds had a standing order not to allow any Americans to get killed, and thus they surrounded our ODAs during combat."

== Operational model of UW ==
At the operational level, the UW force, prepares the battlefield for other units, and conducts operations on conditions favorable to it. SF must constantly be ready to adapt, and to use the political insights of guerrilla warfare theorists whose ideology might be quite different from theirs:

The enemy advances, we retreat; the enemy camps, we harass; the enemy tires, we attack; the enemy retreats, we pursue."

— Mao Zedong

=== Relationships with theater-level command ===
In most cases, the AO will be within the scope of a U.S. regional Unified Combatant Command (UCC), and the UW force will be part of the special operations organization subordinate to that command. There may be rare circumstances in which the SF operation is controlled at national level, with USSOCOM retaining command.

A U.S. Joint Special Operations Task Force is "joint" in the sense that it contains components from different branches of the U.S. military. The JSOTF may also include personnel, perhaps on exchange assignments, from countries with which the U.S. has especially close relationships.

There may be multiple joint task forces (JTFs) in a theater, which contain both regular and special operations forces under a JTF commander. Alternatively, the geographic combatant commander can authorize the theater special operations command (SOC) to establish JSOTFs for pure special operations, based on area of operations or type of operation (e.g., UW versus FID).

Security may dictate that the JSOTF not be on the ground of one of the countries within the geographic region. Especially when the JSOTF has a significant naval component (e.g., while a direct action (DA) mission, Operation Prime Chance headquarters was afloat), the JSOTF headquarters may be afloat. Using advanced communications, the formal headquarters may stay in the United States, with a "forward" command post in the area of operations. Both of these choices can help deal with situations where it might be awkward for the host nation, or the nation hosting the government in exile, to have a U.S. headquarters on its soil.

In the organizational chart, the pink horizontal lines show multinational relationships; in practice, at least some of those pink lines will actually represent multinational headquarters operations. The lower the organization level, the more likely a multinational headquarters will exist.

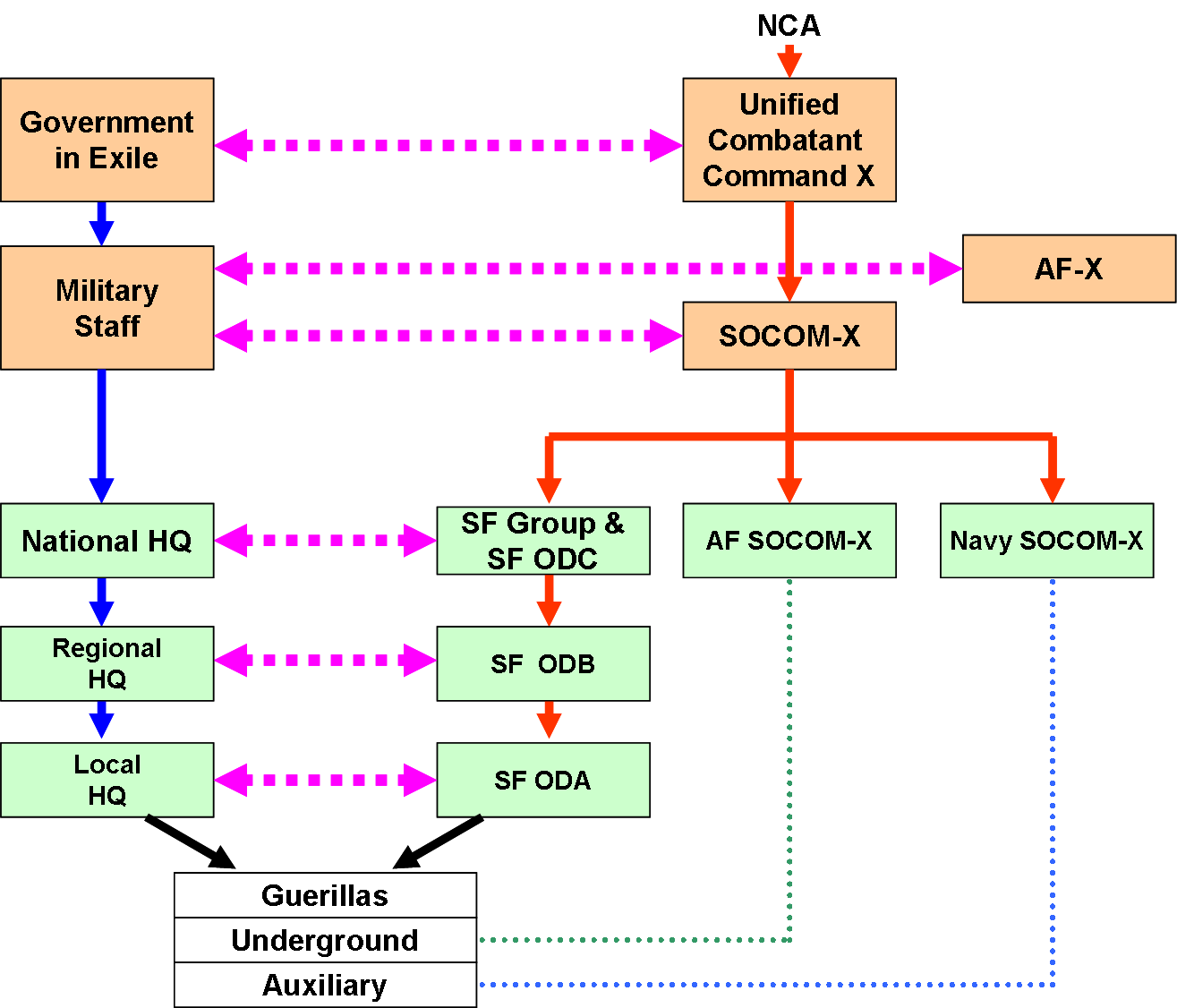
Organization chart showing relationships between U.S. forces and nation whose citizens are guerrillas

Sometimes, the resistance organization already controls part of the AO. Still, there usually will be some liaison personnel that can meet with the regional U.S. planners. If the UW operation is planned to support conventional operations (e.g., the French Resistance started a preplanned series of attacks on German transportation about 48 hours before the Normandy Invasion), UW control may be passed to SF officers attached to the supported conventional force.

Army Special Operations Task Force (ARSOTF) describes an Army command, with an SF or ranger core plus attachments, that deals with specific operations in a UCC. It is typically based on an SF group or ranger regiment. Since countries are assigned to UCCs, the government in exile will work with both American diplomats and an appropriate level of SF organization. An SF battalion, subordinate to a Group, may command all SF operations in a medium-sized country, or a region of a larger one, from a forward operating base (FOB). Company-level headquarters called "advanced operating bases" (AOB) supplement FOB capabilities.

=== Seven-step operational model ===
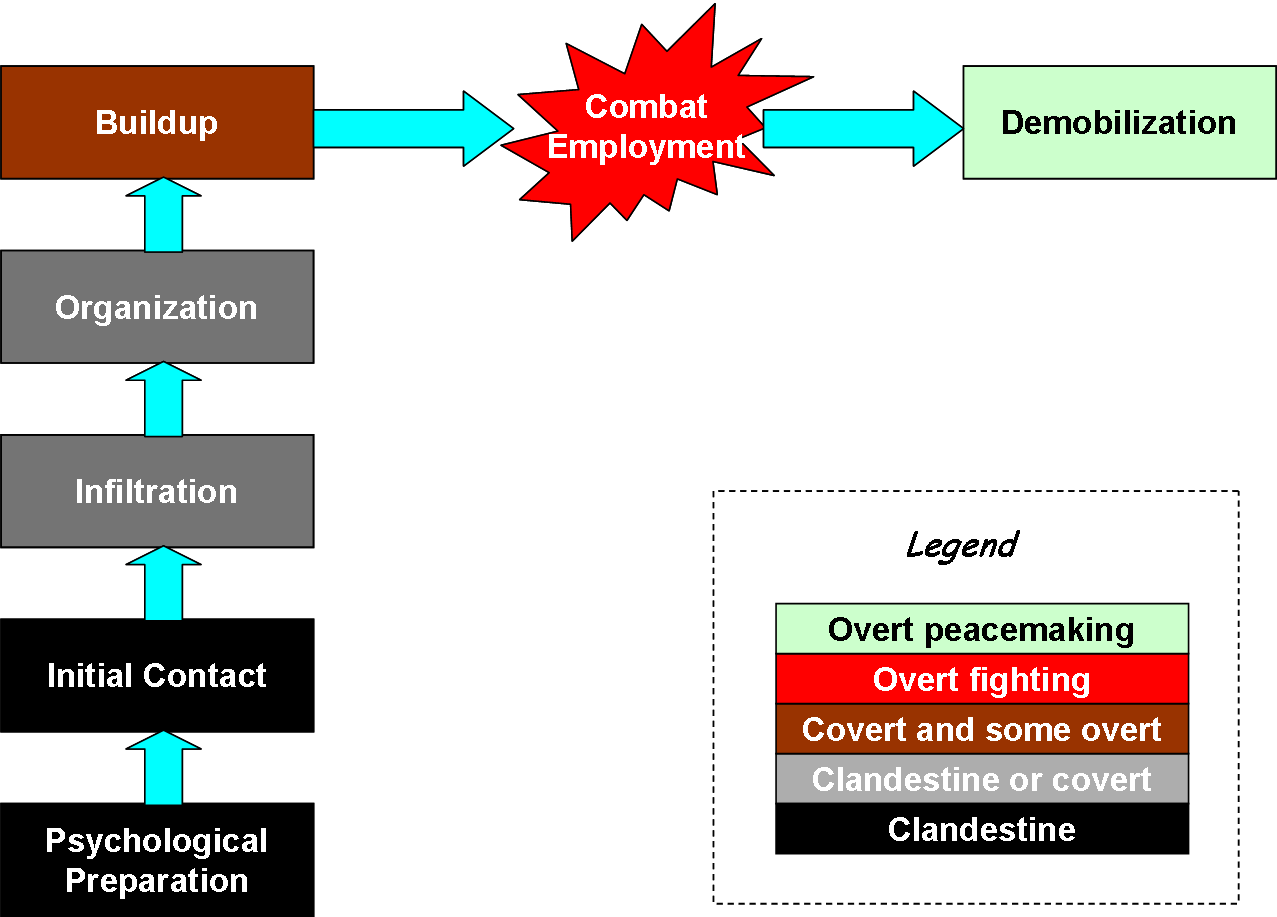
Stages of UW operations

An SF UW campaign is now defined to have seven steps, ending in combat and demobilization. Changing concepts in UW, however, may change the model so that the UW force avoids entering the main combat phase, but carries out critical support operations with the steps before it.

==== Preparation ====
Much of the early steps may take place in a safe area outside the AO, where SF, as well as psychological operations personnel from USSOCOM, the United States Department of State, the Central Intelligence Agency, and other organizations establish contacts with sympathizers in the target country. A wide range of psychological operations techniques are used to increase the likelihood that citizens of the target country will be sympathetic. Such operations can range from overt (i.e., "white propaganda") radio and television broadcasts, to clandestine material purporting to be issued by the opposition (i.e., "black propaganda").

==== Initial contact ====
Small units or individuals, typically from SF or CIA, make clandestine contact with leaders in the AO, and gain agreement that SF teams will be welcomed. For example, in Afghanistan in 2001, CIA paramilitary personnel made the initial contact with leaders of the Northern Alliance, who agreed to accept SF teams that would train and fight with the Afghan resistance. CIA personnel had been in Afghanistan, in noncombat roles, certainly as early as 1999, and had created relationships that could not have been established under the military roles and missions of the time.

CIA paramilitary operatives entered Afghanistan on 26 September 2001 ahead of U.S.

Those operatives established helicopter landing zones for follow-on SOF, and guide SF operational detachments "A" -- who arrived with their arsenal of laser target designators to enable U.S. aircraft to strike Taliban positions -- to the enemy. These CIA officers were inserted ahead of the SOF because of their ability to get on the ground quickly, their language skills and knowledge of the terrain, and their existing contacts with anti-Taliban groups. At the same time, U.S. military forces continued to flow quickly into

Afghanistan, Uzbekistan, Pakistan, and the Arabian Sea, while the CIA continued to increase its activity in the region, adding logistics hubs, communication sites, and command and control centers and capabilities.

==== Infiltration ====
SF operational detachments enter the AO, by clandestine means, such as parachuting at night (especially using HAHO or HALO techniques), delivery by naval special operations vessels or from submarines, by out-of-uniform infiltration from a neighboring country, sub-surface infiltration utilizing closed circuit dive gear (combat diver), etc.

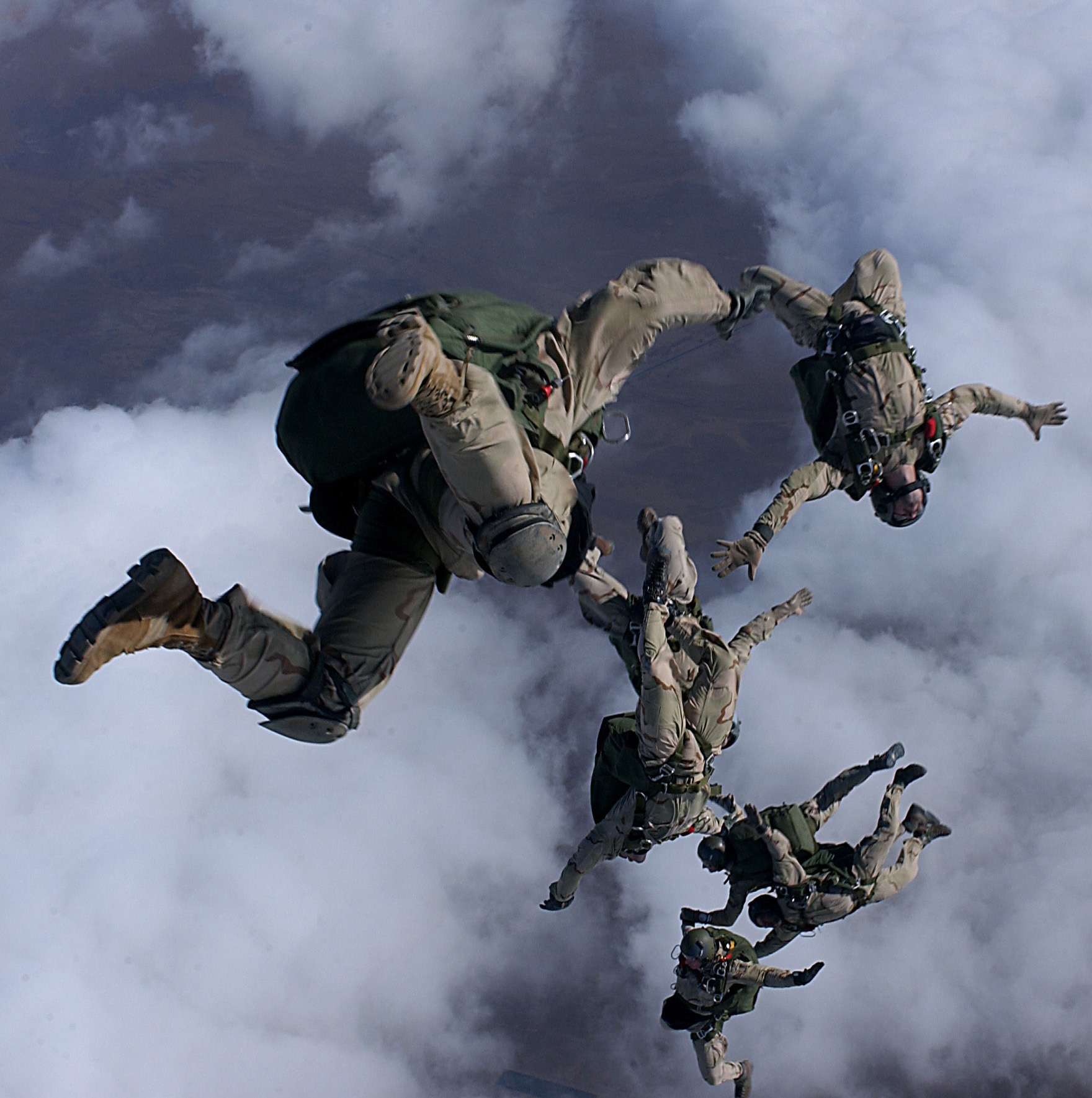
U.S. Air Force parajumpers in support of SF in Afghanistan

If the infiltrating party is to be met by local supporters, there must be pre-agreed recognition signals. Should the infiltrators not be able to find their local contacts, they should have a variety of backup plans, ranging from establishing a clandestine base and waiting for contact, or to be recovered by their own side.

Early in an insurgency, electronic communications should be avoided, as enemy SIGINT might learn of activities simply by detecting an unexpected radio signal. Couriers and personal meetings are resistant to SIGINT, but also have problems of maintaining physical security.

==== Organization ====
Citizen soldiers of the guerrilla force, underground and auxiliary are trained and equipped for their intended roles. SF personnel, possibly supplemented with communications and security experts in the AO, as well as support organizations outside the country, create the clandestine cell system to be used by hidden units. In this phase and later phases, SF medical personnel often work to improve the health of their sympathizers.

==== Buildup ====
The operation increases recruiting, and may begin clandestine intelligence collection and subversion, and possibly some hit-and-run raids and ambushes that have a high probability of success and a low risk of compromising security.

Another covert operational technique, which may be used during this phase, is placing improvised explosive devices (i.e., mines and boobytraps). Sabotage, such as placing an explosive charge under a railroad track, is easier to hide than a raid on the train. If there is aerial bombing of targets, it can be used as a cover for sabotage activities.

Forces that have reached this level have significant intelligence collection, sabotage and subversion, and fire direction capabilities.

==== Employment ====
In the combat phase, the guerrilla force increases the tempo of operations, in a manner consistent with its own safety and security, until the government falls or the guerrilla force links up with conventional forces.

==== Transition ====
A stable country will no longer have autonomous guerrillas. The guerrilla force may form the nucleus of a new military, come under the control of the new national government, or go back to civilian life. It is essential that these experienced soldiers support, not oppose, the new government.

== Tactics ==
UW is asymmetric warfare, which attempts to meet a conventional force under conditions that optimize the UW force's strengths; UW forces avoid combat when conditions are unfavorable to them.

Since UW and other special operations may precede operations by other military components (e.g., regular ground forces, air and missile attacks, etc.), friendly fire is a serious concern, since the special operation may be highly classified, such that the other components are not aware of the UW operation or its location. Deconfliction is the military term for avoiding fratricide, and it is the responsibility of the JSOTF commander, who must balance operations security (OPSEC) against the need for other components to know where they may operate freely.

The basic mechanism for deconfliction is establishing a joint special operations area (JSOA), defined by the overall joint force commander (JFC).

While establishment of a designated JSOA for SOF to conduct independent operations assists in the ease of control of SO and the prevention of fratricide, the JFC should always evaluate the value of isolating SOF against the greater benefit of integrating SOF into the overall campaign plan.

Interdiction is the basic UW combat activity, which uses a variety of tactics to "drain the hostile power's morale and resources, disrupt its administration, and maintain the civilian population's morale and will to resist." UW attacks should be unpredictable, but widely dispersed and occasionally against a target previously struck, so the enemy must disperse their forces. Even in a guerrilla context, the dispersion of hostile forces may become so great that the guerrillas can temporarily gain a local superiority of force.

No target should be attacked without a specific reason for doing so; the selected targets should be part of neutralizing a system of targets. For example, if it is known that the enemy has limited supplies of fuel, attacks against tanker trucks, pipelines, refineries, and storage farms all contribute to damaging their petroleum, oil and lubricants (POL) system. If POL is deemed the critical target system, other attacks support the attacks on POL. If an attack on a barracks will draw away soldiers that otherwise might guard POL resources, such an attack is both diversionary and supportive of the main attack on a critical resource.

=== Basic field operations model ===
In SF doctrine, an operational UW force, made up of U.S. and local personnel, has three general components, although they may not all be part of a specific mission:

- guerrilla force that engages in direct combat with enemy forces. Depending on the situation, this force may be full-time or part-time, and often stays hidden when not in combat.
- underground; a mixture of covert and clandestine functions. Covert functions include sabotage and psychological warfare. Clandestine missions include intelligence gathering and helping key personnel escape from the area of operation.
- auxiliary; whose activities should remain clandestine. Its functions include supply, transportation, acquisition or manufacture of weapons, recruiting, counter-intelligence, reception of personnel and equipment arriving clandestinely, medical services, finance, etc. This support organization can be urban or rural. Especially in urban warfare, the guerrilla force and underground may be integrated.

=== Targeting ===
Detailed targeting may be conducted by separate special reconnaissance or other special operations intelligence resources. The UW unit, however, will almost certainly identify and prioritize targets on its own. One relevant U.S. doctrine is identified by the CARVER mnemonic, although CARVER tends to emphasize air, artillery, direct action raids rather than UW:

- Criticality: How important the target is, in a strategic context. The effect its destruction will have on other elements of the target system. If it is more important to have real-time surveillance of the target (e.g., a road junction) than its physical destruction.
- Accessibility: Ascertain whether an SR team can reach or sense the target, keep it under surveillance for the appropriate time, and then exfiltrate after the target is struck.
- Recuperability: When the target is destroyed by fire support or direct action, in the case of DA missions, ascertain if the enemy can repair, replace, or bypass it quickly, with minimum resources. If so, it may not be a viable target.
- Vulnerability: Find out if SR (including DA) and supporting units have the capability to destroy the target.
- Effect: Beyond pure military effect, what the political, economic, legal, and psychological effects of destroying the target are, and How the attack would affect local civilians.
- Recognizability: Make sure the target can be recognized clearly, by SR and attack forces, under the prevailing weather, light, and in its terrain. If there are critical points within the target, they also must be recognizable by the means of destruction used.

Major target systems vulnerable to UW interdiction operations include railway, highway, waterway, airway, communication, power, water supply, fuel supply, and air defense systems.

=== Means of interdiction ===
To interdict enemy operations, the resistance can use direct combat means such as raids and ambushes. They can also use methods less risky to their security, such as mining or long-range sniping.

==== Raids and ambushes ====
Raids are short-duration attacks on objectives, with the specific understanding that the attacking force will withdraw quickly after achieving the mission objective, or finding they are confronting forces too strong to handle. UW raids can be simply to disrupt an enemy force, to capture usable equipment, for taking prisoners for intelligence exploitation, and destroying installations. Both for attacking strong points at a distance, and for destroying reinforced structures, SF may use missiles, typically derived from antitank weapons. When the raiding force can access the key target, they often use explosives, manually placed so that a small amount can do maximum damage.

Certain targets, such as bridges, historically could be attacked only by manually placed explosives. With the advent of precision-guided munitions, the destructive part of the raid may involve the SF unit controlling air strikes. Air strikes, however, are practical only when U.S. involvement is not hidden.

Where a raid goes to the enemy and attacks, an ambush waits for enemy forces to come to it, and then engages in combat. A well-planned ambush can have the element of surprise, possibly achieve temporary local superiority, fight from cover, and have preplanned withdrawal routes to avoid being encircled.

Mining and sniping support both raids and ambushes. In a raid, mines may be laid near the enemy reaction force barracks. Snipers can take out critical equipment (e.g., floodlights, radars, artillery) or commanders as the raid begins. Both methods can discourage pursuit while the raid or ambush force withdraws.

==== Mining and improvised explosive devices ====
In guerrilla warfare, a great number of casualties are caused by mines and other destructive devices that are triggered by some mechanical interaction between a person and the detonation mechanism of the device. Since such devices rarely have a means of distinguishing between a combatant and a noncombatant, there is a very real risk to civilians, and continues to be in areas of the world where there has been much guerrilla warfare. The United States has not ratified the 1997 Convention on the Prohibition of the Use, Stockpiling, Production and Transfer of Anti-Personnel Mines and on their Destruction, known informally as the Ottawa Treaty. It does promulgate policies and rules of engagement for their use.

When an explosive device is triggered only by the action of a member of the guerrilla force after identifying a legal target, as with the command-detonated mode of the M18A1 Claymore antipersonnel mine, the device is not considered a mine within the context of the Ottawa Treaty. Such devices often are used to initiate combat in an ambush, combining surprise with an intense burst of fragments. U.S. policy states that a directional mine of this type may be emplaced if:

- They are not left out longer than 72 hours.
- The Claymores are located in the immediate proximity of the military unit that emplaced them.
- The area is monitored by military personnel to ensure civilians stay out of the area.

A common use of mines in guerrilla warfare, however, would be to emplace them behind a retreating guerrilla force, so the pursuit force would trigger them. Modern mines disarm themselves after a period of time, but the majority of both purpose-built and improvised mines do not and present the chief humanitarian concern. U.S. policy commits to stop using manufactured mines, which do not automatically disarm, by 2010 "with exception for use for mine action/demining training and research purposes. The US no longer uses non-detectable land mines of any type", although these restrictions all apply to mines manufactured by the United States. The use of improvised mines and boobytraps, however, is a continuing issue.

Since a guerrilla force expects to have the population become increasingly loyal to it, there is an obvious psychological problem with leaving an area with active explosive devices. Especially when a guerrilla force has limited supplies, there is tactical utility to improvising devices, which could be as simple as a hand grenade, fastened next to a trail, and with a taut wire attached to the activating lever of the grenade. Stepping on the wire would pull out the safety ring and start the detonation sequence of the grenade. SF policy does not clearly address this type of device, or those made completely from local materials and having no automatic disarming features. The U.S. Rules of Engagement might ban such devices, but, especially in urban or jungle areas where the guerrillas are not constantly observed, the ban might not be enforced.

==== Sniping ====
Snipers, when the term is used properly, are highly skilled riflemen that use specialized weapons and tactics to attack specific personnel and equipment far outside normal rifle range. SF sniper training is separate from the training of snipers assigned to conventional units; the USSOCOM sniper school is at Fort Bragg, while the general Army school is at Fort Benning.

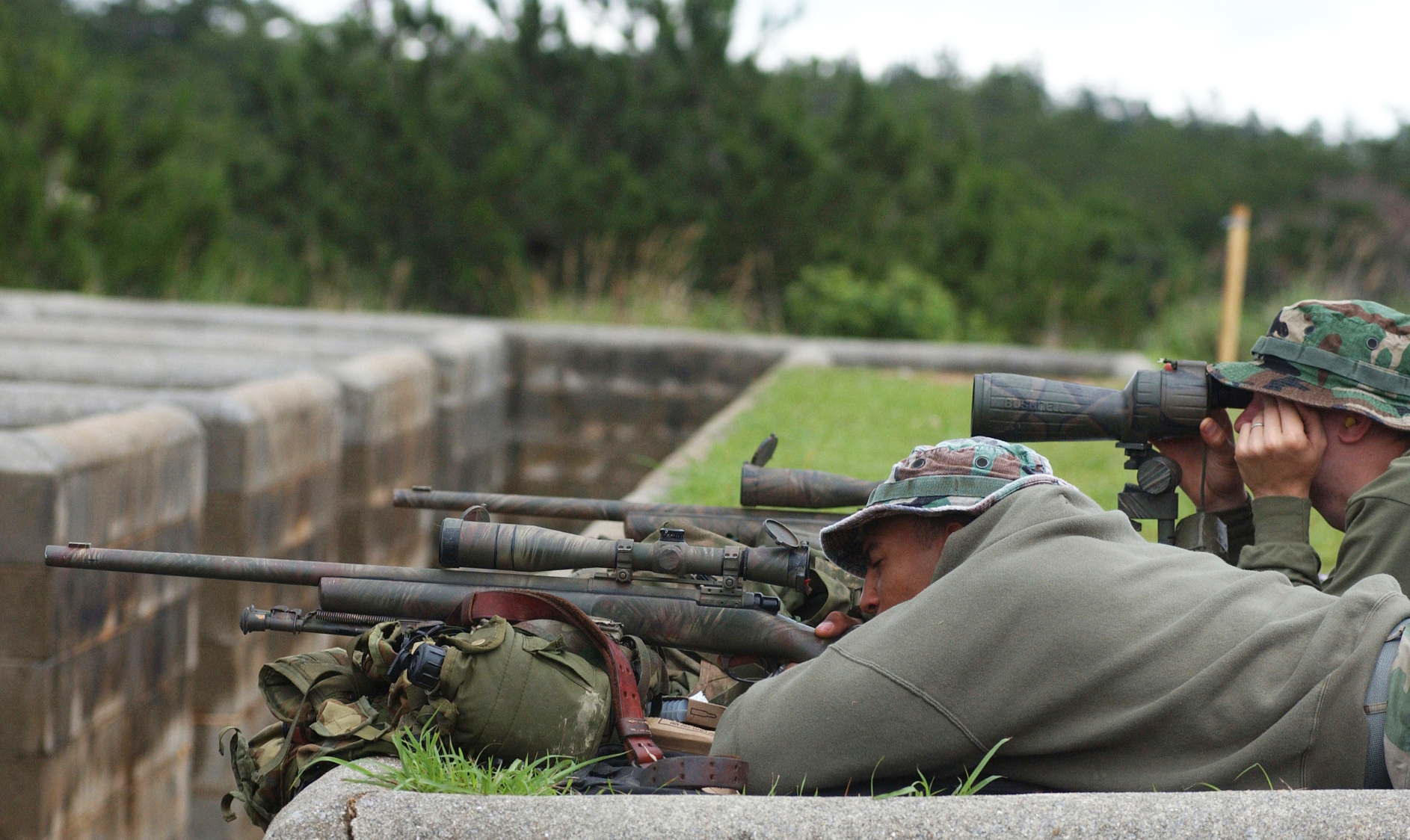
Sniper team: note shooter and observer

In most circumstances, SF snipers use the same rifles as other Army snipers:

- 7.62 mm for ranges under 1 kilometer
  - M24 7.62 mm sniper weapon system, based on the commercial Remington M700 rifle
- .50 caliber for ranges over 1 kilometer, especially for materiel targets:
  - M107/M88, a bolt-action rifle that is the standard sniper rifle for U.S. Navy special operations
  - M82A1, a semiautomatic rifle used by conventional units

=== Sabotage and subversion ===
Both sabotage and subversion are means to reduce the military, political, economic, or morale strengths of an opponent. They differ in that sabotage involves physical damage or damage to information systems, while subversion relies more on changing the behavior of personnel trusted by the opponent. Before the act of sabotage or subversion is executed, preparations for the act must be kept under tight security control. Only a small information leak could defeat the attack.

When sabotage takes place, it may be covert rather than clandestine, in that the enemy knows he has been hurt, but may not know who hurt him. In the more subtle examples of sabotage, however, the enemy may not suspect deliberate action caused an aircraft to crash.

Where the saboteur might contaminate aircraft fuel, the aircraft could be put out of service by a clerk committing subversion, by delaying or losing maintenance orders, resupply of fuel or munitions, or "misrouting" an order for the aircraft to attack.

==== Sabotage ====
The U.S. defines sabotage as "an act or acts with intent to injure, interfere with, or obstruct the national defense of a country by willfully injuring or destroying, or attempting to injure or destroy, any national defense or war materiel, premises, or utilities, to include human and natural resources."

In a more modern context, sabotage may be one of many ways to attack a given enemy target system. If, for example, the POL target system is targeted, tank farms and refineries could be raided, or pipelines and tanker trucks ambushed or attacked with mines. These will be very evident to the enemy, and the resistance could be damaged if some of their combat teams are captured and interrogated.

If a saboteur were able to gain access to that tank farm, or fuel tanks of vehicles and aircraft, and add a chemical that slowly damaged engines, that agent could be far away by the time the enemy determines what had happened. Carefully planned sabotage can be one of the safest tactics for a UW force.

Sabotage is usually carried out clandestinely by the underground or auxiliary, but it can be carried out by the guerrilla force, under the cover of a combat operation.

SF teams must take great care, especially in failed or failing states with crumbling infrastructure, not to enable dissidents to create hardship for the general population. An excellent example, which reflects societal characteristics that might not be obvious to Americans, is sabotaging an airfield that provides a widely used commodity that must be fresh, such as khat in Somalia.

==== Subversion ====
Subversion is formally defined as "action designed to undermine the military, economic, psychological, or political strength or morale of a regime." In an insurgency, it will almost certainly be carried out by members of the underground or auxiliary, who have gained the trust of the enemy.

== Support to the UW force ==
=== Strike support ===
In the organization chart, there is a dotted line to the UCC air command, which normally controls both Air Force and Navy aircraft in the region, and may have air assets based in the U.S. detailed to them. The military staff of the guerrilla government might, assuming U.S. involvement is known, request a U.S. air strike on some target that the guerrillas cannot destroy, or perhaps even reach. Such strikes are not a panacea, as an air strike with civilian casualties will turn the essential political dynamic against the guerrilla force.

=== Communications ===
Communications security is critical. New Special Forces software-defined radios, such as the AN/PRC-148 Joint Tactical Radio System (JTRS) Inter/Intra Team Radio (JITR) are easily portable, secure and flexible, but capture of such a unit, in the early phases of an operation, confirms U.S. involvement. Tactical radios used internally by the UW force are even more vulnerable to capture. When U.S. involvement is known, however, the latest technology is routinely used.

As a consequence, SF communications specialists must be competent with old but deniable radio communications, including those using Morse Code or field-improvised antennas in the high frequency (HF) range.

=== Intelligence support to UW forces ===
All levels of SF operational detachment have some intelligence collection and analysis capability. Where appropriate, SF has two standing types of teams for intelligence augmentation, one for SIGINT/secure communication and one for counterintelligence. The SF SIGINT unit is the Support Operations Team-Alpha.

Sensitive intelligence sources and methods may not be shared, although the information learned through these sources and methods will be shared. This is not a U.S.-only rule; while the U.S. may not share the details of technical methods such as SIGINT, the guerrilla government may have extremely sensitive information sources. During the Vietnam War, for example, the general U.S. rule was that Vietnamese allies could see only SIGINT information that had a SECRET or lower classification, and that did not carry the additional restriction "handle through COMINT channels only".

=== Logistics ===
Logistical support for all U.S. special operations come from two lines of command: USSOCOM provides "SO-peculiar support to SOF units worldwide." An example of SO-peculiar support would be providing Soviet-bloc ammunition if the guerrillas already have weapons that need it. The UCC commander, however, has overall responsibility for all joint support in his theater. The JSOTF logistics officer (J-4) is responsible for using the extraordinary procurement mechanisms legislatively authorized for USSOCOM, and making sure they are used appropriately.

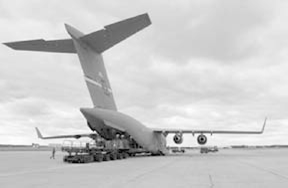
When time, geographic, and/or resource constraints are imposed on the theater support infrastructure, USSOCOM may deploy organic assets in support of SOF.

Note that dotted lines run from the underground and auxiliary to Navy and Air special operations units under the UCC Special Operations commander. These indicate that resupply might be brought in by sea or air, and the UW force will use other than the guerrilla force to receive them. Indeed, the guerrillas might make a diversionary attack to draw attention from the logistics or other vulnerable operation.

SF commands, at battalion and above, have service detachments, tailored to specific missions. The SF support detachment has the responsibility for delivering supplies to the UW units in the field, by means specific to the situation, ranging from clandestine parachuting to armed conventional convoy crossing to the AO.

Title 10 United States Code, Section 167, vests the SOCOM commander with the responsibility and the authority for the development and acquisition of SO-peculiar equipment, materiel, supplies and services—items needed for SO activities; for which there is no service-common requirement; or which the SOCOM commander deems as critically urgent for the immediate accomplishment of an SO activity.

Supplies may be provided by the host nation or private companies within it, if such acquisition is consistent with operational security and mission-specific requirements. This function is centralized under the JSOTF J-4, but civil affairs personnel may provide the actual interface to local providers.

== See also ==
- Foreign internal defense
- Fourth generation warfare
- Psychological operations (United States)
- TM 31-210 Improvised Munitions Handbook
- Simple Sabotage Field Manual
- United States Army Special Forces
- War on terror
