= The Anarchist Cookbook =

1971 book by William Powell

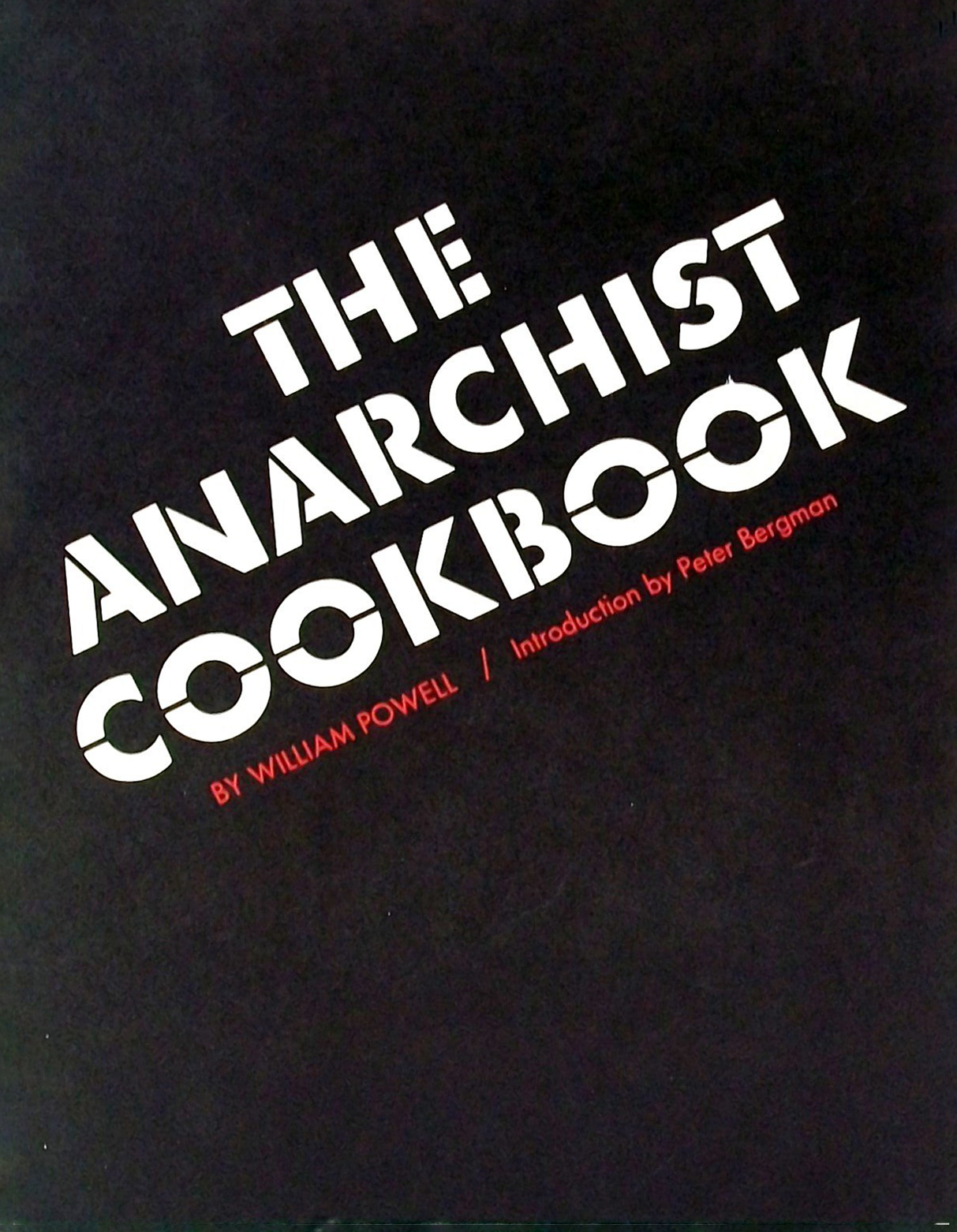
- Book cover
- Author: William Powell
- Language: English
- Publisher: Barricade Books
- Publication date: January 1971
- Publication place: United States

The Anarchist Cookbook, first published in 1971, is a book containing instructions for the manufacture of explosives, rudimentary telecommunications phreaking devices, and related weapons, as well as instructions for the home manufacture of illicit drugs, including LSD. It was written by American teenager William Powell at the apex of the 1960s counterculture era to protest against the United States' involvement in the Vietnam War. Powell converted to Anglicanism in 1976 and later attempted to have the book removed from circulation. However, the copyright belonged to the publisher, Lyle Stuart, Inc. (now Barricade Books), which continued circulating the book until being bought out in 1991. The legality of the book has been questioned in several jurisdictions.

== History ==
=== Creation ===
William Powell in 1971

The Anarchist Cookbook was written by William Powell as a teenager and first published in 1971 at the apex of the counterculture era to protest against the United States' involvement in the Vietnam War. Powell gained inspiration for his text from his experiences with Vietnam veterans while living in New York City, during which time the pacifist movements of the 1960s began to take a more violent turn. Powell began plans to become a writer but decided upon a political course when he was drafted into the Vietnam war, which inspired him to write "recipes" and later compile them into a "cookbook". The initial vision of The Anarchist Cookbook was to post instructional flyers in New York City, including how to properly throw a Molotov cocktail and how to make LSD. These "recipes" were eventually adapted to make up an entire book. From 1968 to 1970, Powell began researching in the "U.S. Combat Bookshelf" at the New York Public Library, including mainstream external texts such as The Boy Scout Handbook, and anarchist texts like Fuck the System by Abbie Hoffman. The initial manuscript was sent to Lyle Stuart in 1970.

Powell stated The Anarchist Cookbook was initially designed as a book meant to provide education to "the silent majority" of the American population. He described that the book was not intended for extant political fringe organizations but was designed to galvanize a great societal change by inciting the general population. The ultimate goal of the text was to provide the general population with the skills and capabilities to organize against fascist, capitalist, and communist threats. Powell stated: "The central idea to the book was that violence is an acceptable means to bring about political change", a sentiment that he would renounce later in life.

=== Author's remorse ===
Lyle Stuart, former publisher of The Anarchist Cookbook

After writing the book as a teenager, Powell converted to Anglicanism in 1976 and later attempted to have the book removed from circulation. In 1979, Powell left the US, traveling to the Middle East, Africa, and parts of Asia. He worked as a faculty member for international schools backed by the US. During this time, he began writing about pedagogy and conflict resolution. This led him to renounce his book and instead campaign for its withdrawal from publication. He was unable to legally stop the publication of The Anarchist Cookbook because the copyright had been issued to the original publisher Lyle Stuart, and subsequent publishers that purchased the rights have kept the title in print. Powell publicly renounced his book in a 2013 piece calling for the book to "quickly and quietly go out of print".

Powell had difficulty finding employment throughout his life, having described the book as "a youthful indiscretion or mistake that can haunt someone during their early years or even longer." In 2011, Powell and his wife, Ochan Kusuma-Powell, founded Next Frontier: Inclusion, a non-profit organization for children with developmental disabilities and learning disabilities; he described it as a means to atone for writing the text. Powell died on July 11, 2016, at age 66.

=== Publication status ===
Powell originally sent the manuscript to over 30 publishers until Lyle Stuart bought the book and its copyright. Powell received royalties for the book, approximately $35,000 until he split with the company in 1976. Despite Powell's protest against the continued publication of the text, the copyright of the book never belonged to its author, but to its publisher, Lyle Stuart Inc. The publisher agreed to publish the text as an attempt to defy efforts by the Central Intelligence Agency (CIA) and Federal Bureau of Investigation (FBI) to obtain lists of people who checked out books that were deemed subversive. Stuart kept publishing the book until the company was bought in 1991 by Steven Schragis, who decided to drop it. Out of the 2,000 books published by the company, it was the only one that Schragis decided to stop publishing. Schragis said publishers have a responsibility to the public, and the book had no positive social purpose that could justify keeping it in print. The copyright was bought in 2002 by Delta Press (a.k.a. Ozark Press), an Arkansas-based publisher that specializes in controversial books, where the title is their "most-asked-for volume". As of 2016, over two million copies of the book have been sold.

== Content summary ==
=== Foreword ===
The Anarchist Cookbook begins with a Foreword section, detailing the author's intentions for the text. At the time of writing, Powell believed that the United States was slowly declining towards communism, thus he found it necessary to write a book that guided people on revolution against this transition. He championed the idea of "bringing America back to where she was two hundred years ago", believing his revolutionary ideals to be reactive, rather than proactive. Powell begins with his vision for the book in how it is intended to educate and galvanize the public to make tangible change in their home countries. Powell states that fringe political organizations, such The Minutemen and The Weathermen, are not the intended audience, rather it is written for "the silent majority". Powell envisioned the people of the United States rebelling against what he deemed to be oppressive capitalistic ideals, and to a lesser extent, against fascist and communist movements.

=== Content ===
Powell begins the content of his book by discussing anarchy and anarchist theory. Anarchy, by his definition, is a wide-scale mass uprising by the people, similar to that of civil disobedience through violence. He believed that anarchy was the innate state of all individuals, and therefore human nature would drive people to participate in such practices. Powell believed that current expressions of politics, arts, music, and education all contained innate principles of anarchist ideals, thereby equating anarchism to individualism. This principle drives Powell's argumentation as he believed that the current political climate and the Vietnam war had undermined human values, therefore revolution based upon his perception of human dignity and freedom was what drove him to write the piece. He ends his introduction by warning of the seriousness that these recipes may have deadly consequences if used improperly. The chapters of The Anarchist Cookbook include descriptions and detailed instructions in hand-to-hand combat, explosives, booby traps, drugs, tear gas, sabotage and demolition, surveillance, improvised weapons, and other topics related to anarchism.

== Reception ==
=== Legal reviews ===
At the time of its publication, one FBI memo described The Anarchist Cookbook as "one of the crudest, low-brow, paranoiac writing efforts ever attempted". The book was reviewed by the Department of Justice, the White House, the FBI, and by both John Dean and Mark Felt, Richard Nixon's lawyer, and FBI Director J. Edgar Hoover's associate director respectively. While having concerns about the text, the FBI concluded that it could not be regulated as it was published through mass media. Furthermore, the FBI ruled that The Anarchist Cookbook does not incite "forcible resistance to any law of the United States" and is therefore protected under the First Amendment. While much of the text was deemed to be inaccurate, the FBI concluded that the chapter on explosives "appears to be accurate in most respects". Since its conception, the FBI has kept records of the book, releasing the bulk of its investigation file in 2010.

== Media presence ==
=== Internet/media ===
Much of the publication was copied and made available as text documents online through Usenet and FTP sites hosted in academic institutions in the early 1990s, and has been made available via web browsers from their inception in the mid-1990s to the present day. The name varies slightly from Anarchist Cookbook to Anarchy Cookbook and the topics have expanded vastly in the intervening decades. Many of the articles were attributed to an anonymous author called "The Jolly Roger".

Knowledge of the book, or copied online publications of it, increased along with the increase in public access to the Internet throughout the mid-1990s. Newspapers ran stories about how easy the text was to get hold of, and the influence it may have had with terrorists, criminals, and experimenting teenagers.

=== Film ===
The book served as a central element of the 2002 romantic comedy The Anarchist Cookbook.

Repercussions from the book's publication, and the author's subsequent disavowal of its content, were the subject of the 2016 documentary film American Anarchist by Charlie Siskel. In the film, William Powell explains in depth his thoughts on the book and the consequences it had in his life. It further explores the themes of responsibility and repercussions that decision can have on one's life. Powell's death in 2016 received little media coverage until the release of American Anarchist, which was a few months after his death.

== Legality ==
=== Australia ===
The book was refused classification in 1985 thus making it banned in Australia under the National Classification Code Table 1.(c) for publications that could "promote, incite or instruct in matters of crime or violence". It was classified RC again on 31 October 2016.

=== Canada ===
In 2002, the Canadian government permitted the book to be imported from the United States. Canada Customs and Revenue Agency concluded the book does not violate either hate or obscenity laws, therefore the previous ban on the text was resolved.

=== United Kingdom ===
Possession of The Anarchist Cookbook without reasonable excuse has been successfully prosecuted as the offence of possessing information of a kind likely to be useful to a person committing or preparing an act of terrorism, contrary to Section 58 of the Terrorism Act 2000.

=== United States ===
In 2015, U.S. Senator Dianne Feinstein unsuccessfully pushed to have the book removed from online databases.

=== Notable incidents related to possession ===
Possession of the book has been associated with a variety of attacks:

- 1973: Two bombings of military recruitment centers in Portland, Oregon, US by anti-war activists in a conspiracy which included academic and bookseller Frank Stearns Giese, following which it was claimed in court that The Anarchist Cookbook was part of the group's library.
- 1976: Police linked the bombing of Grand Central Terminal and hijacking of a TWA flight to Croatian radicals who used instructions from The Anarchist Cookbook.
- 1981: The Anarchist Cookbook was linked to Puerto Rican rebels who bombed an FBI headquarters using the book's directions. Thomas Spinks also referred to the text during the bombings of 10 abortion clinics in the United States.
- 1999: The terrorist behind the 1999 London nail bombings, David Copeland, is reported to have read from The Anarchist Cookbook when plotting his attacks.
- 2005: The London public-transport bombers were linked to the book.
- 2010: In County Durham, UK, Ian Davison and his son were imprisoned for the manufacturing of ricin and possessing terrorist materials, including The Anarchist Cookbook. The judge expressed surprise that it was widely available. This led to a London judge and police campaigning to have the book banned in the UK.
- 2012: The Anarchist Cookbook was found to have been in the possession of James Holmes, the perpetrator of the Aurora theater shooting in Colorado, United States.
- 2013: The author advocated for discontinuing the book after it was found in the possession of perpetrators of a school shooting in Arapahoe, Colorado and the 2013 Santa Monica shootings.

Possession led to charges in several cases in places where it was illegal:

- 2007: A 17-year-old was arrested in the United Kingdom and faced charges under section 58 of the Terrorism Act 2000 for possession of The Anarchist Cookbook. He was cleared of all charges in October 2008, after arguing that he was a prankster who just wanted to research fireworks and smoke bombs.
- 2017: Joshua Walker, a 27-year-old arrested on return from fighting for the YPG in Syria, was prosecuted under section 58 solely for the possession of the book. He was found not guilty as he had a reasonable excuse: he had downloaded it for an academic purpose and forgot to destroy it afterwards.
- 2021: Oliver Bel, a 23-year-old mathematics graduate of the University of Cambridge, was convicted in the UK of an offence under section 58 for possessing the book, receiving a sentence of 3 years' imprisonment. The book was found by police in a search of Bel's home following a series of racist and anti-Semitic comments online; Bel had also been in contact with the banned far-right group National Action.
- 2021: Ben John, a 21-year-old student, was found guilty of an offence under section 58 for possessing a copy of the book on a computer hard drive; he was given a suspended sentence and told by a UK judge to "read classical literature", such as Pride and Prejudice, only for the Court of Appeal to rule that order unlawful, sentencing John to three years: two years in custody, one year on licence.
- 2025: Claudiu Stefan Cristea, a 46-year-old from Leicester, was found guilty of an offence under section 58 for possessing a copy of the book when found on his bookshelf.

== See also ==
- The Big Book of Mischief
- Illegalism
- La Salute è in voi
- Keith McHenry, who wrote a parody of this book focusing on food mutual aid in 2015
- Johann Most, author of The Science of Revolutionary Warfare, an inspiration of this Cookbook according to the forewords
- Propaganda of the deed
- Kurt Saxon, who wrote a similar book providing instructions on improvised weapons and munitions
- TM 31-210 Improvised Munitions Handbook
