= Bresci Circle =

Anarchist group in New York City

The Bresci Circle was a group of New York City anarchists who are remembered for a failed bombing attempt on St. Patrick's Cathedral in 1915, in which two of its members were arrested. The group was named after Gaetano Bresci, a New York anarchist who killed King Umberto I of Italy.

== Origins ==
In July 1900, the anarchist Gaetano Bresci assassinated King Umberto I of Italy. Several months earlier, Bresci had been living in New York City. According to Thomas Tunney of the New York Police Department, Bresci had attended an Elizabeth Street meeting of anarchists where he accused the others of being cowards and they accused him of being a police spy. The meeting was called off as its heat threatened to attract police attention, but Bresci was incensed and it is implied that this affront precipitated into his plot to return to Italy and become a martyr.

A group of New York City anarchists subsequently formed as the Bresci Circle, in Bresci's honor. By 1914, almost 600 members met regularly at a rundown house in East Harlem. Their speakers included Emma Goldman and Alexander Berkman. The group also affiliated with the Wobblies, who were closely affiliated with anarchism.

== Activities ==
A plot to bomb the Rockefellers increased police interest in the group. Three months following the 1914 Ludlow Massacre, the type of violence that incensed the Galleanists, a group of anarchists carried a bomb to the Tarrytown estate of the Ludlow coal mine owner, John D. Rockefeller. They miscalculated, both in failing to trigger the device and since Rockefeller was out of town. A member of the Circle was arrested near the estate on July 4, 1914. The anarchists carried the bomb back to a tenement in the Italian section of East Harlem (near the Bresci Circle headquarters). Later that day, a bomb's accidental explosion demolished half of the building and killed three anarchists.

While no group took responsibility for four additional bombings in 1914, the police continued to suspect the Bresci Circle. In October 1914, bombs exploded at St. Patrick's Cathedral and the priest's house at St. Alphonsus Church. There were also attacks on the Bronx County Courthouse and The Tombs, a jail. The New York City bomb squad, recently inaugurated under Thomas Tunney, sent an undercover detective into the group, but his aggressive behavior and lack of Italian language led him to be twice suspected and unsuccessfully tried for spying. He later withdrew from the group and the police provisioned another detective and Italian speaker, Amedeo Polignani, to infiltrate the group.

=== Abarno and Carbone ===
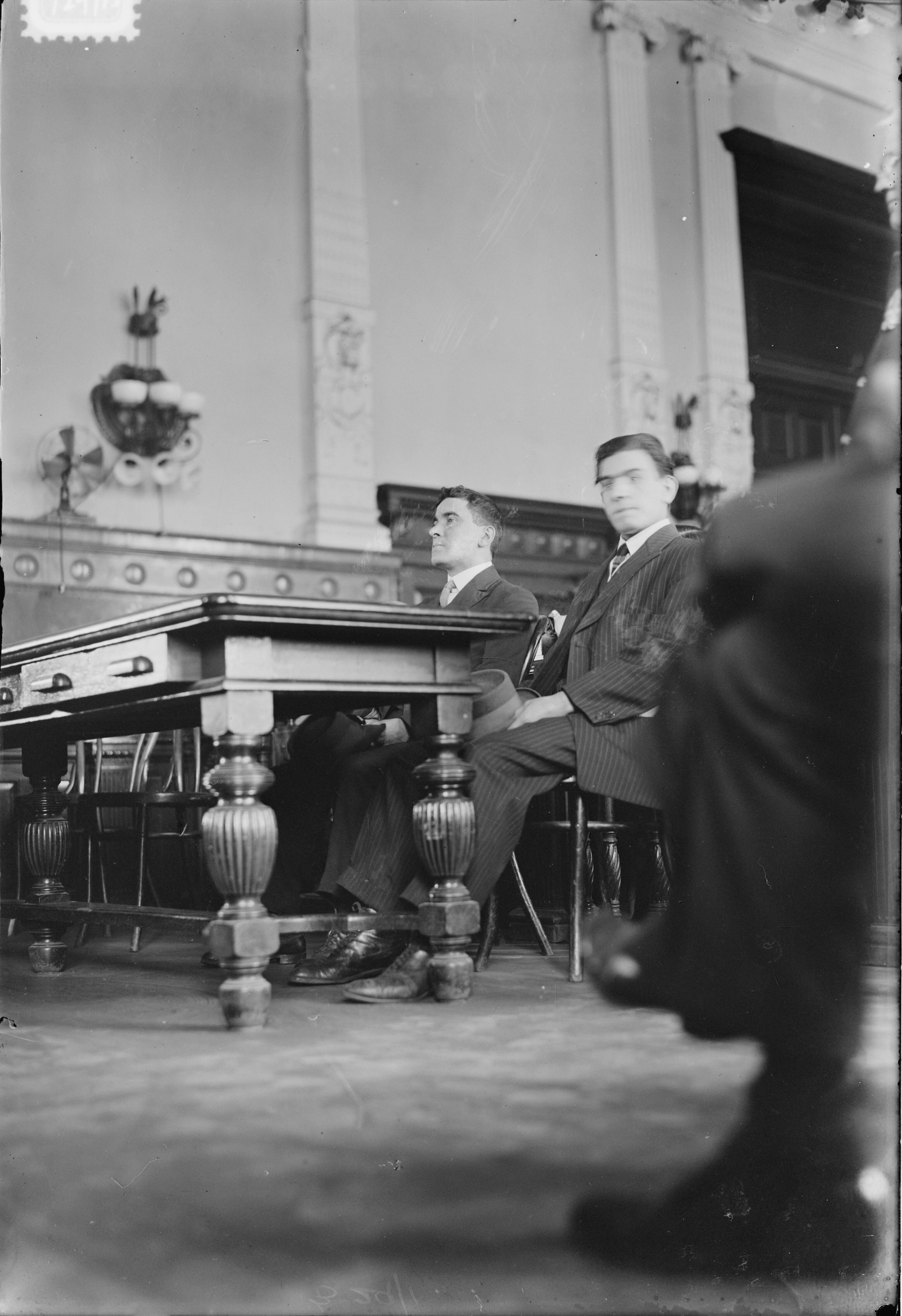
Abarno and Carbone in court

As the Circle planned a repeat attack for March 1915, the police were ready. Two young men dressed as laborers entered St. Patrick's at Mass with lit and later concealed cigars. One placed a device from his coat pocket on the floor and lit it with his cigar. A woman who had been cleaning the marble floor stopped his exit and a nearby, elderly man smothered the device's fuse. Another nearby large man grabbed the accomplice. The events transpired with such rapidity that few of the service's participants noticed. The scrubwoman, elderly man, and large man had all been planted members of the police. The bomb squad chief had followed the anarchists by limousine, and fifty disguised officers were deployed at the church. The bomb squad stood for photographs. Frank Abarno and Carmine Carbone were convicted for the attempted bombing and were sentenced to Sing Sing for six to twelve years, half of the maximum. The undercover Polignani received multiple death threats upon his identity's reveal.

Technical expertise was Polignani's entree into the group, where he used the name "Frank Baldo". Polignani's account of meeting Abarno and Carbone differs from their own. Polignani said that he was approached by Carbone, who suggested the church as a target. The police added that Abarno and Carbone were also impatient with their peers' caution. Abarno and Carbone, who accused the police of entrapment and frameup, said that Polignani accosted them after a meeting and suggested both the use of dynamite and the church target, that the plot and bombs were of Polignani's own design. In time, the undercover detective purchased supplies and a room in which the three made two bombs of sulfur, black antimony, potassium chlorate, and brown sugar, which they packaged in soap tins and to which they attached iron rods with coat hanger wire as shrapnel. The day of the attack, Carbone said that he had stayed late at work and needed sleep, so Polignani and Abarno walked together to the church, where hundreds congregated. Polignani and Abarno briefly sat in the tenth row and appeared to be praying. Abarno then left his bomb near the north altar, but later claimed to not light the fuse. He was immediately arrested.

National newspapers presented the failed bombing as proof of a larger conspiracy and presented Polignani as a hero. The bomb squad sensationalized the arrests and spoke grandly of the pair's other targets. Photographs of the undercover scrubwomen and the Fire Department Bureau of Combustibles' chief inspector, whose face showed burn marks from a prior bomb, enhanced the proof. An important aspect of the sensationalization and police account was that Abarno and Carbone had received their bomb-making training from a handbook and not from Polignani. Labor activists and anarchists suspected Polignani as an agent provocateur since he featured prominently in the plot and had purchased the bomb components. The police had duplicated Carbone's copy of La Salute è in voi, an Italian-language bomb-making handbook circulated among Galleanists, which Carbone had purchased from the Bresci Circle and passed through Abarno to Polignani. The police insinuated that simple possession of the handbook, which was never mentioned by name, was evidence of both Abarno and Carbone's technical expertise and bad intentions, but the church bomb design was based on that of fireworks and not of the handbook.

Abarno and Carbone's legal defense revolved around La Salute è in voi and their right to read any books of any kind, including bomb-making handbooks. After their arrests and before receiving lawyers, Abarno told the press that he had learned bombmaking from Carbone's handbook, and Carbone asserted in broken English that he didn't know the handbook's contents upon purchasing it. After Abarno credited the handbook with deranging him, in appeal for clemency during arraignment, the prosecution used seditious books to show the anarchists' intents. A chemist testified that the explosive's power did not exceed that of a firework. Literature professor Ann Larabee concluded that the handbook's role was to sully Abarno and Carbone, having no proof of connection to the crime.

The case rekindled fear of easily accessible bomb-making instructions and sensationalism around anarchism.

== Bibliography ==
- Larabee, Ann (2015). "Sabotage". The Wrong Hands: Popular Weapons Manuals and Their Historic Challenges to a Democratic Society. New York: Oxford University Press. pp. 36–63. ISBN 978-0-19-020117-3. OCLC 927145132.
