= Bresci =

Bresci (Italian pronunciation: [ˈbreʃʃi]) is an Italian surname. Notable people with the surname include:

- Gaetano Bresci (1869–1901), Italian anarchist
- Giulio Bresci (1921–1998), Italian road racing cyclist

== See also ==
- Bresci Circle, group of New York City anarchists
- Brescia
