= Ettore Molinari =

Italian chemist and anarchist (1867–1926)

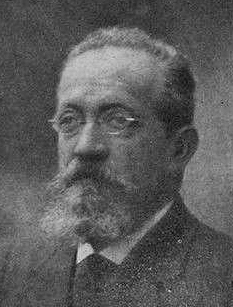
- Born: July 14, 1867; Cremona, Italy
- Died: November 9, 1926 (aged 59); Milan, Italy
- Occupation: Chemist

Signature
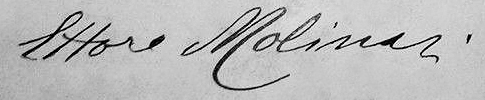

Ettore Molinari (1867–1926) was an Italian chemist and anarchist. He was likely to be one of the authors of La Salute è in voi.

== Bibliography ==
- D'Attilio, Robert (1982). "La Salute è in Voi: The Anarchist Dimension". Sacco-Vanzetti: Developments and Reconsiderations—1979. Boston Public Library. ISBN 978-0-89073-067-6.
- Larabee, Ann (2015). "Sabotage". The Wrong Hands: Popular Weapons Manuals and Their Historic Challenges to a Democratic Society. Oxford University Press. pp. 36–63. ISBN 978-0-19-020117-3.
