= Charles Maurin =

French painter

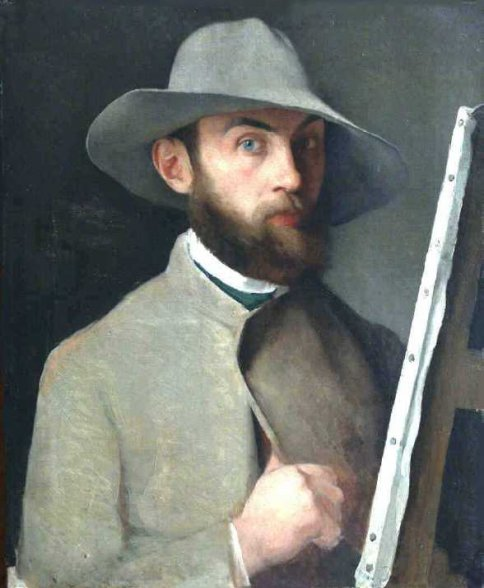
Self-portrait of Charles Maurin

Charles Maurin (1 April 1856 – 22 July 1914) was a French painter and engraver in a variety of styles.

== Life and career ==
Maurin was born in Le Puy-en-Velay (Haute-Loire, Auvergne-Rhône-Alpes). He was awarded the Prix Crozatier in 1875, and used the funds to go to Paris to study art at the Ecole des Beaux-Arts under Jules Lefebvre from 1876 to 1879. He also studied at the Académie Julian, where he eventually taught. He exhibited at the Salon of French artists and became a member of the Society of French Artists in 1883. He was a friend and mentor of the painter Félix Vallotton.

== Art ==
Maurin received the support of Vollard and was a friend of Toulouse-Lautrec—who had his first individual exhibition with him in 1893—and also of many other artists, including François-Rupert Carabin and the entertainer Aristide Bruant. A notable symbolist work of his is Maternity, a study of motherhood. Inspired by Japanese artists, he revolutionized the technique of etching, and also produced woodcuts. In 1891 he patented a method of color printing. He contributed to La Revue Blanche, directed by Félix Fénéon, and Les Temps nouveaux, published by Jean Grave.

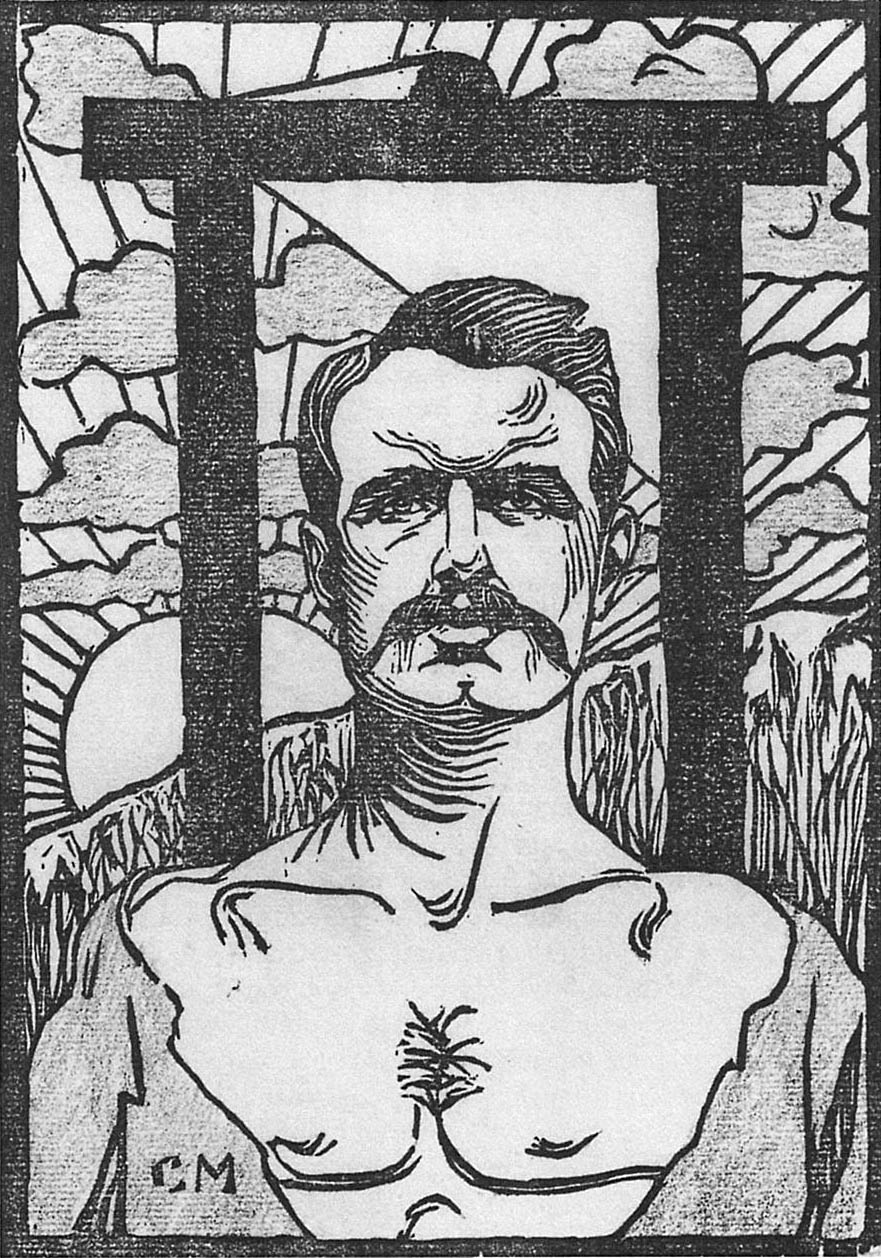
Ravachol (1893)

In 1893 Maurin produced a commemorative woodcut of the anarchist Ravachol, depicting him in front of the guillotine against a rising sun and a field of grain. The art historian Howard G. Lay has commented on the piece's "japoniste perspective" and "robust linearity", its "schematization of form" and "stylistic overtures to artless sincerity", which he argues lend the picture an "iconic bearing" and its subject a "saintly stature". It was later featured on the cover of the early 1900s bomb-making handbook La Salute è in voi.

Charles Maurin died on 22 July 1914 in Grasse, southeast France.
