= American Anarchist =

2016 American documentary film

- Promotional poster
- Directed by: Charlie Siskel
- Written by: Charlie Siskel
- Produced by: Charlie Siskel
- Starring: William Powell
- Cinematography: Nina Bernfeld; Nick Foxall
- Edited by: Chris McKinley
- Music by: T. Griffin
- Production companies: Bow and Arrow Entertainment
- Distributed by: Gravitas Ventures
- Release date: September 2, 2016 (Venice Film Festival)
- Country: United States
- Language: English

American Anarchist is a 2016 American documentary film written and directed by Charlie Siskel. It centers on interviews with William Powell, author of the controversial 1971 book The Anarchist Cookbook. The film premiered out of competition at the 73rd edition of the Venice Film Festival.

== Content ==
The film focuses primarily on an interview between Siskel and Powell, covering topics such as Powell's early life, what led him to write The Anarchist Cookbook, its publication and initial reception, Powell's post-book career as a teacher for emotionally disturbed children, Powell's personal life with his wife Ochan and son Colin, his renunciation of the book's contents, and the incidents where the book was found among the belongings of the perpetrators, including, but not limited to, the Columbine High School massacre, the Arapahoe High School shooting, and the 2012 Aurora, Colorado shooting, as well as a number of assassination attempts on government officials.

== Reception ==
On Rotten Tomatoes, the film has an approval rating of 67%, based on 12 reviews. On Metacritic it has a score of 58 out of 100 based on reviews from 5 critics, indicating "mixed or average" reviews.

Matt Fagerholm writing for RogerEbert.com rated the film three out of four stars, and wrote: "American Anarchist presents us with a young man who believed he was living in the apocalypse, and whose book has gone on to have an apocalyptic effect on society." Michael Rechtshaffen of the Los Angeles Times wrote: "Although it occasionally feels as if the thoughtful Powell (who unexpectedly died last summer) is being forced into a repentant corner, the film remains a penetrating case study in taking ownership of one’s actions." Ben Kenigsberg of The New York Times called it "A study in denial, American Anarchist may be illuminating for being unilluminating."

== Death of William Powell ==
William Powell died in July 2016, aged 66, before the release of the film.
