= François-Rupert Carabin =

French sculptor (1862 – 1932)

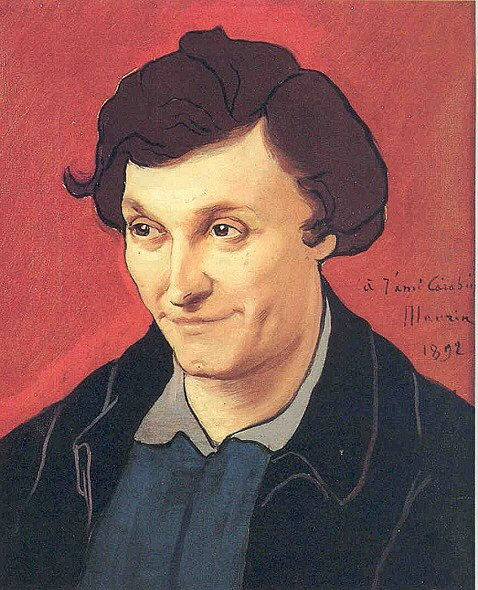
Rupert Carabin, by Charles Maurin, 1892, Musée Crozatier, Le Puy-en-Velay, 45x37cm.

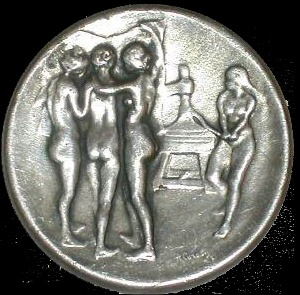
Medal engraved for Le Journal.

François-Rupert Carabin (17 March 1862, in Saverne, Bas-Rhin – 28 November 1932, in Strasbourg) was a French cabinetmaker, photographer and sculptor. His work was representative of the Art Nouveau style.

== Biography ==
Carabin was born of Alsacian parents on 17 March 1862. His family had been displaced by war in 1870 and after refusing to accept German nationality they moved to Paris when Carabin was just 8 years old. At the age of 16 he apprenticed with an engraver there. His first job was as an ornamental sculptor for a furniture manufacturer in a Saint-Antoine suburb.

Between 1889 and 1919, Carabin sculpted many furniture pieces, mainly constructed from oak, pear, or walnut wood. One such piece, completed in 1893, was entitled Fauteuil.

He made medals and practiced photography. After World War I concluded, he was named the director of the École supérieure des Arts Décoratifs de Strasbourg and was regularly invited to the Vienna Secession. He worked in the artistic milieu of Montmartre and made a series of photographic studies of prostitutes. His sculptures and designs featured the female form as structural rather than symbolic elements, tending towards the Decadent style. He sculpted a series of statuettes of dancers in bronze which he exhibited in 1897 at the Bernheim Gallery. He also participated at the Salon des Indépendants from 1884 to 1891. Around 1900 he exhibited his works in the Vienna Secession and as member and delegate of this artist association he organised art of the French avant-garde for the Vienna Secession.

Carabin completed many monuments to the dead in the Great War, including the monument in Saverne that was destroyed in 1942 during World War II. Carabin died on 28 November 1932 in Strasbourg, France.

== Selected works ==
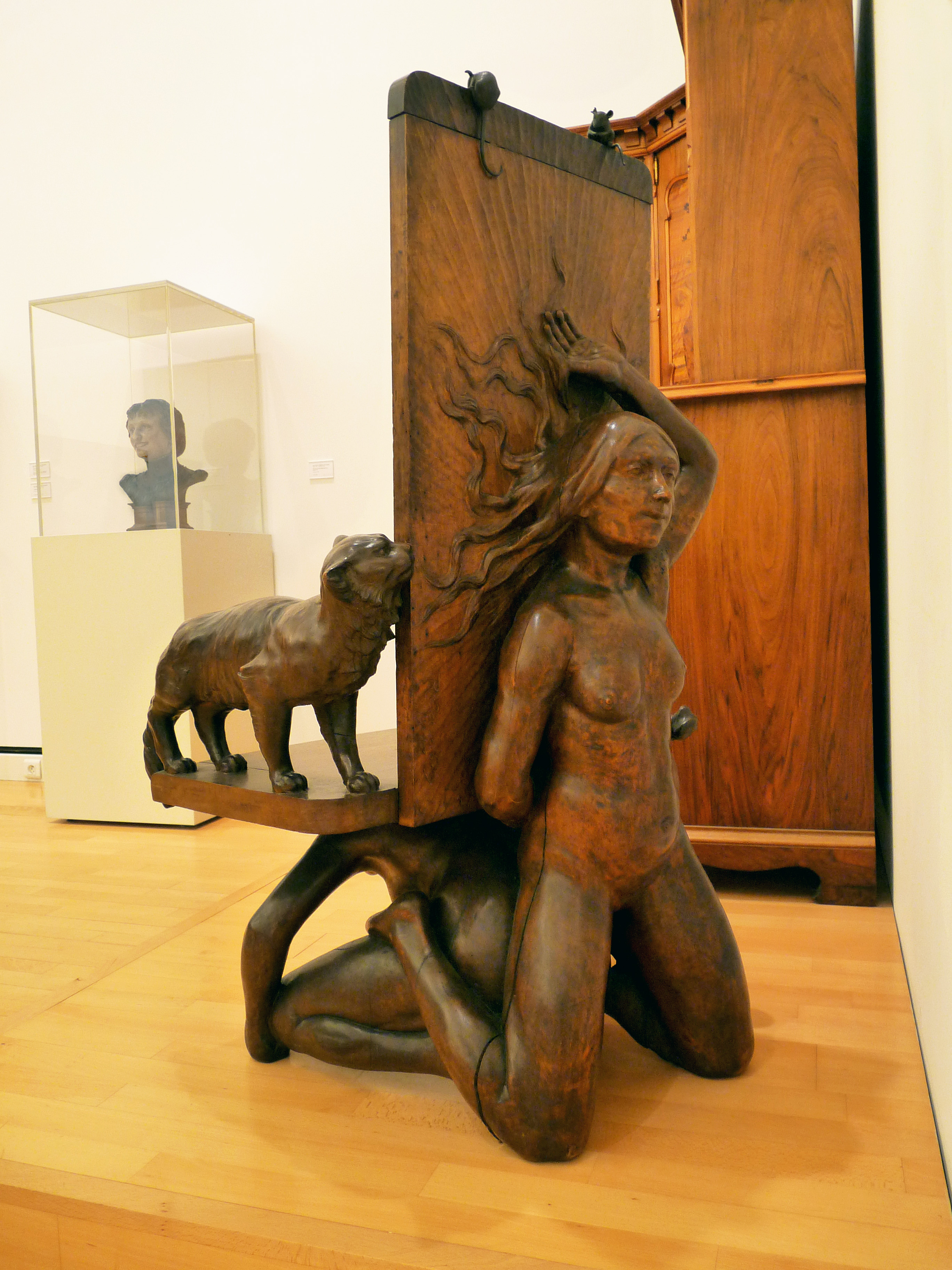
Fauteuil (back)

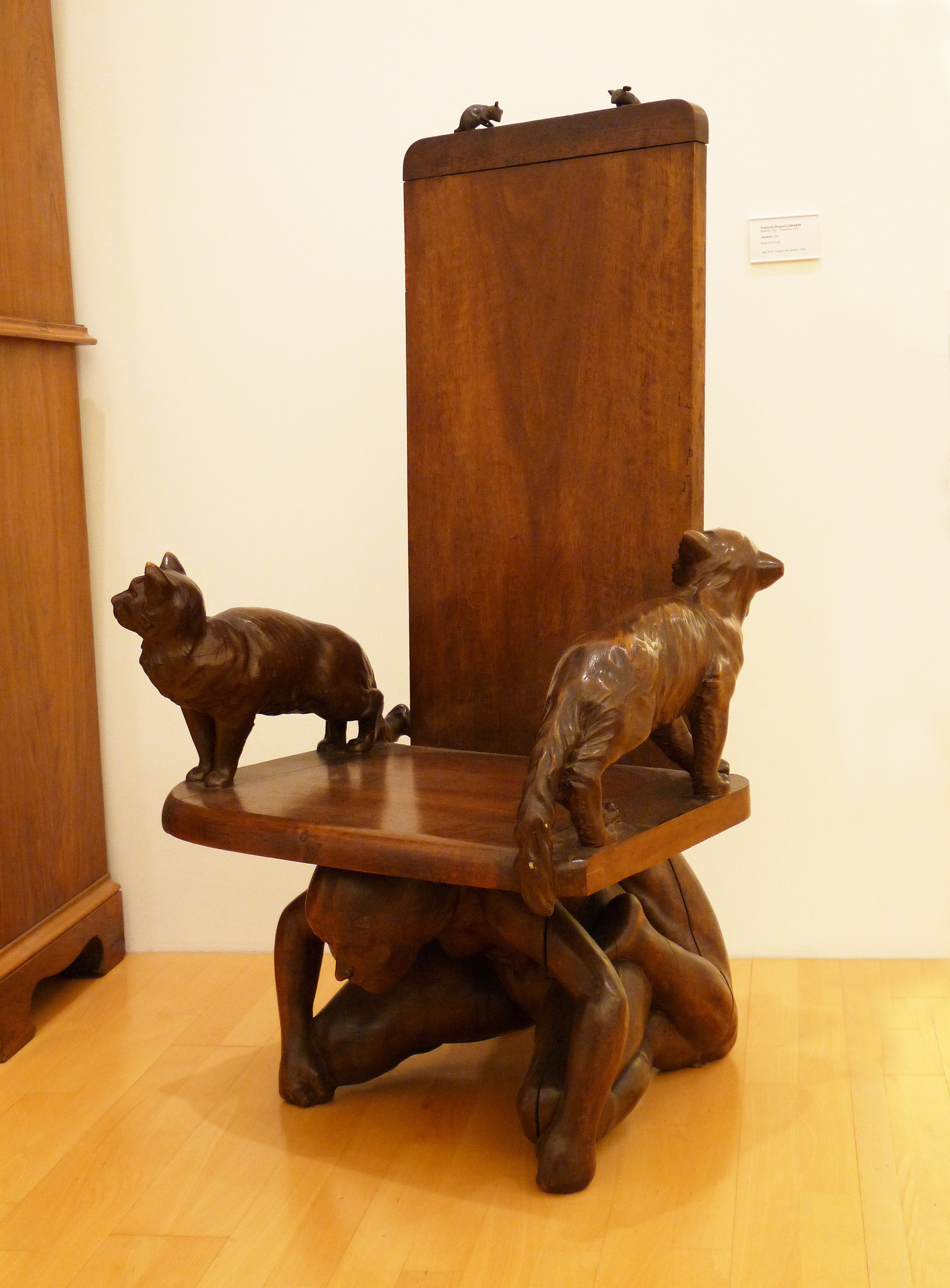
Fauteuil (front)

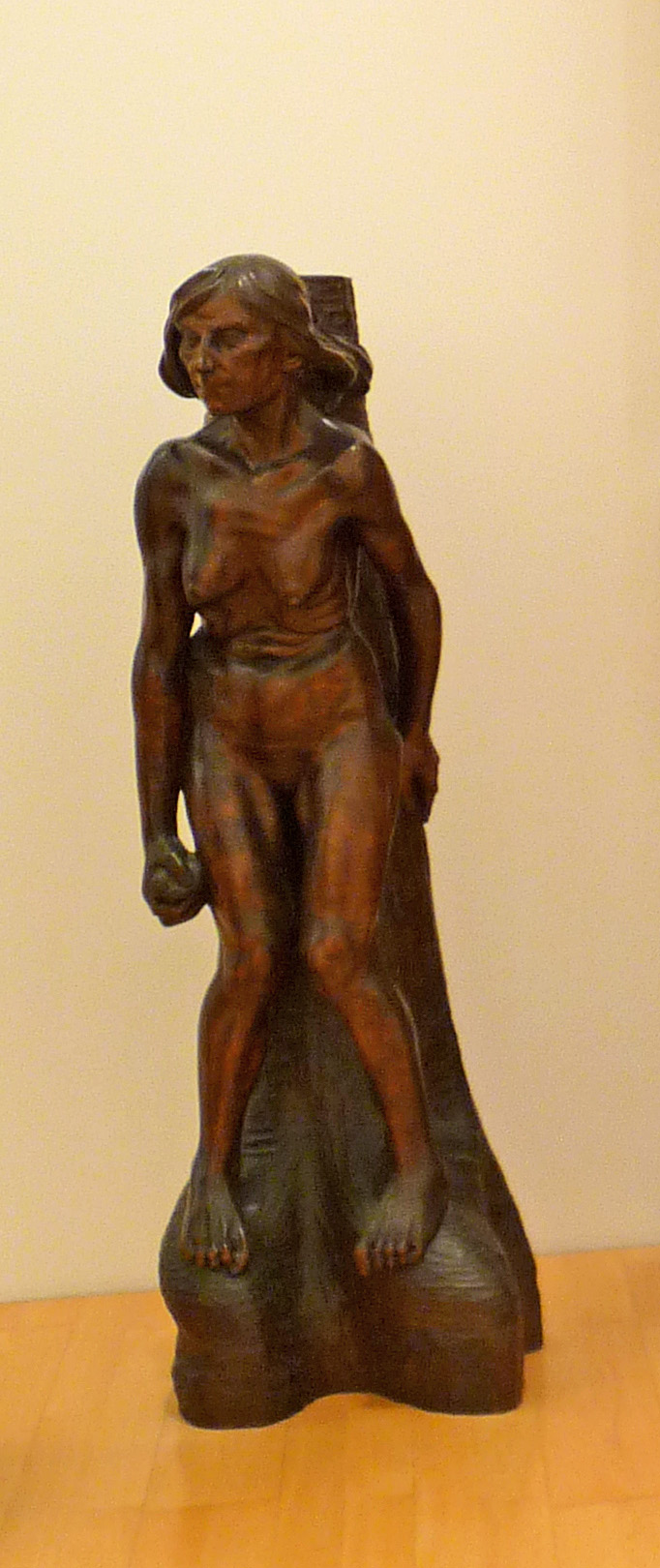
La Souffrance

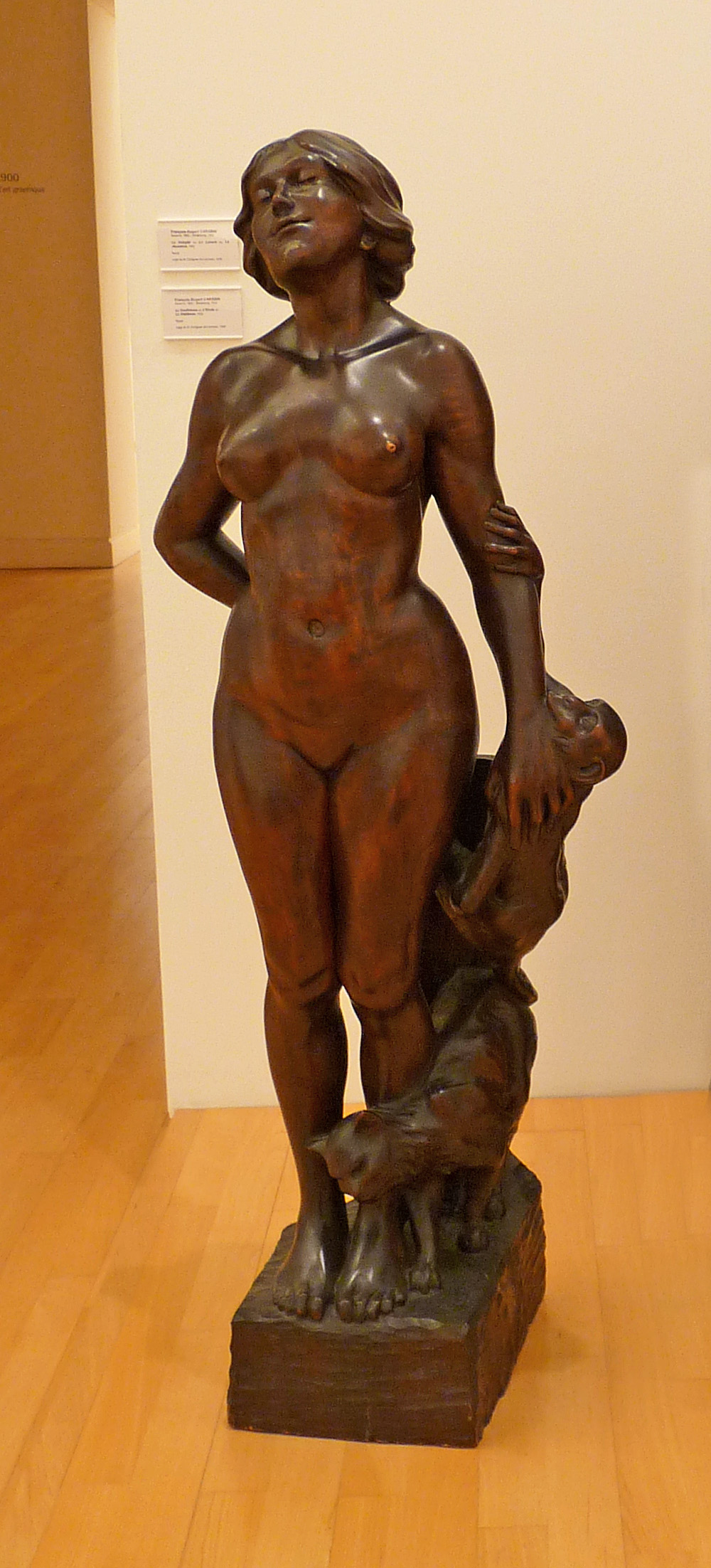
La Volupté

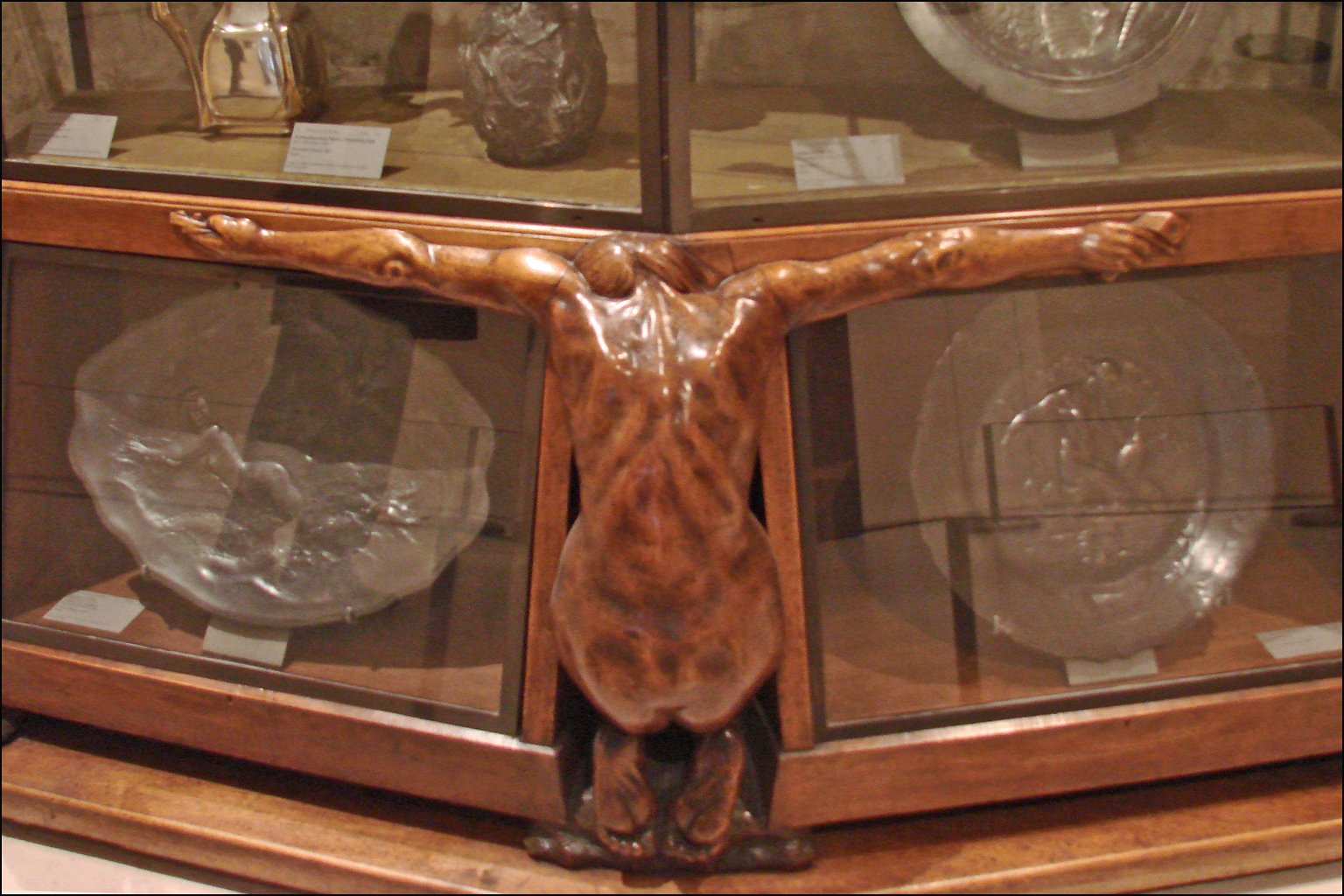
Vitrine pour objets d'art

== Main works ==
- La légende Savernoise, 1914, statuette, wood, Musée d'Orsay, Paris.
- Loïe Fuller, 1896–1897, statuette, bronze, Nouvelle Pinacothèque de Munich
- la Critique artistique, 1891, statuette, polychrome wax, Musée d'Orsay
- Fontaine-Lavabo, 1893, Musée d'Orsay
- Fauteuil, 1893, oak and wrought iron, Musée d'Art Moderne de Strasbourg
- La Volupté (or La Luxure, or La Jeunesse), 1902, Musée d'Art Moderne de Strasbourg
- La Souffrance (or La Vieillesse, or L'Envie), 1902, Musée d'Art Moderne de Strasbourg
- Bibliothèque, 1890, wrought iron, Musée d'Orsay à Paris
- Buffet Sel et poivre, 1906–1908
- Encrier, 1900–1901, Richmond, Virginia Museum of Fine Arts
