= Simple Sabotage Field Manual =

Formerly classified document (1944)

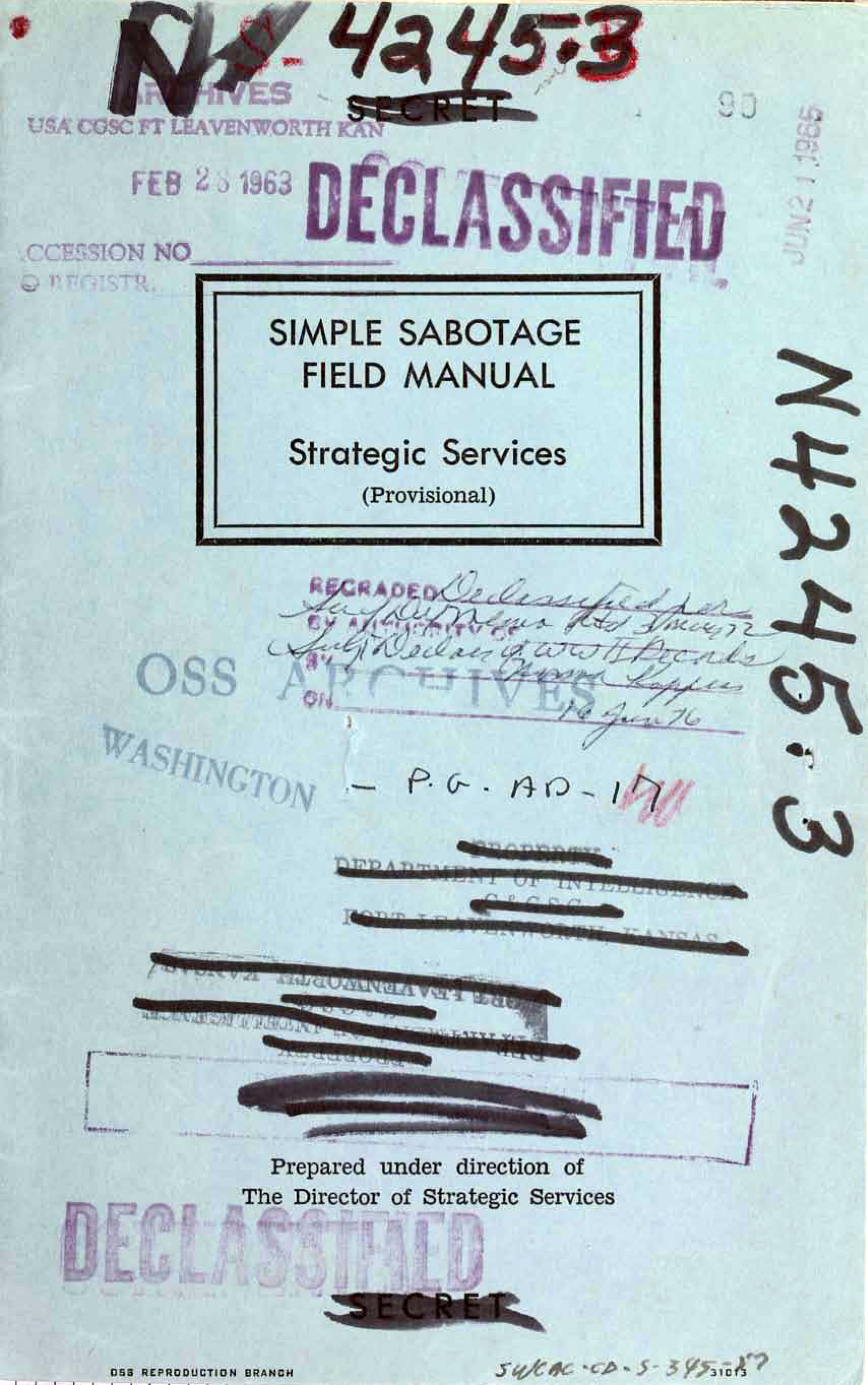
- Cover page
- Created: 17 January 1944
- Author: Office of Strategic Services

Full text
- Simple Sabotage Field Manual at Wikisource

The Simple Sabotage Field Manual is a document written by the US Office of Strategic Services in 1944. The manual was declassified by the Central Intelligence Agency in 2008.

The manual was distributed to OSS officers in foreign countries in order to help them train "citizen-saboteurs" in German-occupied Europe.
