= Ann Larabee =

American literary historian

- Born: 1957 (age 67–68)
- Occupation: Professor
- Known for: The Wrong Hands

Ann Larabee (born 1957) is an American literary historian who has written on the cultural impact of disasters. She is a professor of 20th century and contemporary literature at Michigan State University.

== Works ==
- The Wrong Hands: Popular Weapons Manuals and Their Historic Challenges to a Democratic Society (2015)
- The Dynamite Fiend: The Chilling Tale of a Confederate Spy, Con Artist, and Mass Murderer (2005)
- Decade of Disaster (2000)
