= The Big Book of Mischief =

Book about explosives by David Richards

The Big Book of Mischief (TBBOM) is a book by David Richards. This manual describes the process of creating and detonating a wide variety of explosives. The end products include dry ice bombs and nitroglycerin. Construction of the devices described in the book is generally illegal, in addition to being highly dangerous.

According to the file's revision information, a version of TBBOM, then known as The Terrorist's Handbook (by The Jolly Roger), was compiled between 1987 and 1989. The more familiar version, built on the Handbook and other underground BBS text resources, was first posted in the early morning of August 8, 1990, as The Complete Terrorist Today. It assumed its final title with the March 31, 1991, revision.

The most common edition of TBBOM is the 1.5 release (1993).

In 2018, a British teenager was sent to youth custody for four years and eight months after admitting that he had downloaded the book to his phone.

== See also ==
- The Anarchist Cookbook
- E for Ecstasy
