= TM 31-210 Improvised Munitions Handbook =

United States Army manual

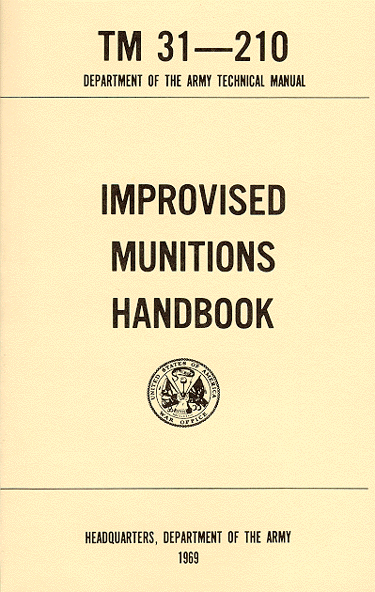
- Author: Headquarters, Department of the Army
- Language: US English
- Genre: Military technical manual
- Publisher: United States Department of War
- Publication date: 1969
- Publication place: Washington, D.C.
- Pages: 256
- OCLC: 506081564
- Text: TM 31-210 Improvised Munitions Handbook at MilitaryNewbie.com

The handbook in PDF format (click to access)

The TM 31-210 Improvised Munitions Handbook is a 256-page United States Army technical manual intended for the United States Army Special Forces. It was first published in 1969 by the Department of the Army. Like many other U.S. military manuals dealing with improvised explosive devices (IEDs) and unconventional warfare, it was declassified and released into the public domain as a result of provisions such as the Freedom of Information Act (FOIA), and is now freely available to the public in both electronic and printed formats.

The manual explains how in unconventional warfare operations, for logistical or security reasons, it may be impossible or unwise to use conventional military munitions as tools when conducting certain missions. Starting from this consideration, the manual describes the manufacture of various types of ordnances from readily available materials, from junk piles, common household chemicals and supplies purchased from regular stores.

The manual was mentioned in news reports by various media after it was seized from people suspected of planning guerrilla or terrorism activities.

The manual is one of the best official references on improvised explosive devices (IEDs) manufacturing, and some of the weapons described in it have been used against U.S. troops by foreign troops. For example, the hand-grenade-in-a-can trap was used against U.S. troops in Vietnam. Furthermore, the manual was found in many abandoned safe houses of various Islamist groups, for example in Kabul, Mazar-e Sharif and Kandahar (Afghanistan), as well as in destroyed training camps.

The TM 31-210 manual was subject to considerations regarding the repercussions of easy public access to information on the artisanal manufacturing of weapons and explosives.

The manual has also been mentioned in scientific literature, used as a reference for works dealing with topics such as ballistics, forensic investigations, security engineering and counterterrorism.

== Sections ==
The TM 31-210 manual consists of seven main sections:

- Explosives and propellants (including igniters)
- Mines and grenades
- Small arms weapons and ammunition
- Mortars and rockets
- Incendiary devices
- Fuses, detonators & delay mechanisms
- Miscellaneous

The miscellaneous section deals with the production of various types of trigger mechanisms (pressure, pressure release, traction, etc.), a makeshift precision balance, electric batteries, makeshift bulletproof barricades and more. The manual ends with two appendices, which briefly deal with the properties of some primary and secondary explosives.

== Popular culture ==
The TM 31-210 manual appeared as an "Easter egg" in the 1995 CGI animated film, Toy Story. In the scene where Woody is trapped under a blue plastic box in Sid's bedroom, it's possible to see behind him a document titled "TM 31-210 Improvised Interrogation Handbook", a clear reference to the actual document.
