= The Wrong Hands =

2015 book

- First edition
- Author: Ann Larabee
- Subject: American sociology, political history, criminology
- Publisher: Oxford University Press
- Publication date: 2015
- Pages: 264
- ISBN: 9780190201173

The Wrong Hands: Popular Weapons Manuals and Their Historic Challenges to a Democratic Society is a 2015 book by Ann Larabee on the history of government responses to do-it-yourself weapons manuals.
