= Lucio Urtubia =

Spanish anarchist and forger (1931–2020)

Lucio Urtubia Jiménez
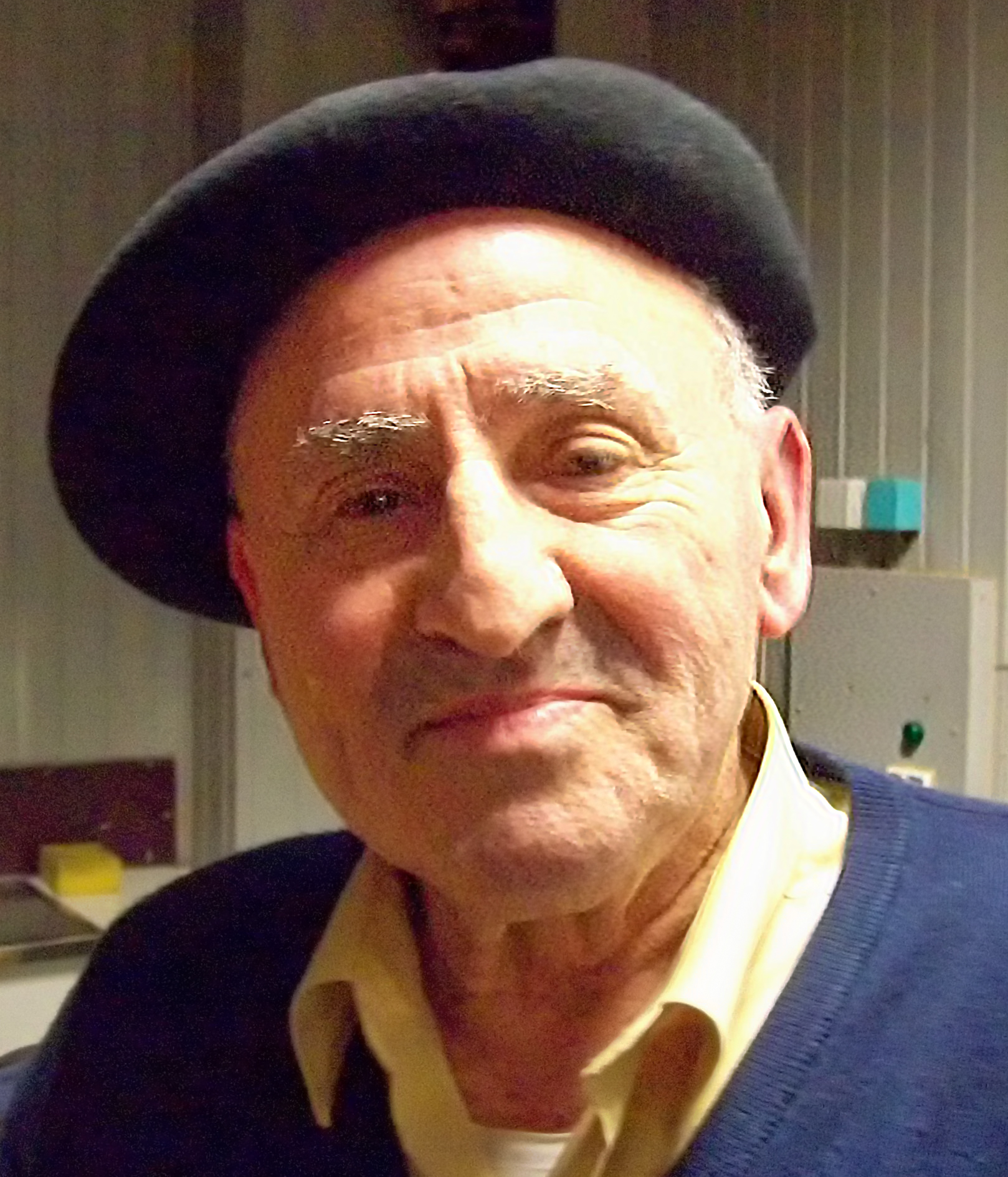
- Urtubia in 2010
- Born: 18 February 1931; Cascante, Navarre, Spain
- Died: 18 July 2020 (aged 89); 20th arrondissement of Paris, France
- Occupation(s): Forger, bricklayer
- Movement: Anarchism

Lucio Urtubia Jiménez (1931–2020) was a Spanish anarchist who carried out a campaign of bank robberies and forgeries during the 1960s and 1970s. He became an anarchist while in exile in France, where he met Quico Sabaté and carried out a number of bank robberies with him. He then forged US dollars, as part of a plan to destabilise the economy of the United States, and fake passports to aid refugees fleeing repressive states. His largest scheme involved defrauding Citibank of tens of millions of dollars in forged traveller's cheques, which he used to fund guerrilla groups.

== Biography ==
=== Early life and activism ===
Lucio Urtubia Jiménez was born in Navarre, northern Spain, in 1931. His father was a socialist and was imprisoned by the Francoist dictatorship after agitating for the autonomy of the Basque Country. Urtubia was raised in poverty, recalling one occasion when a baker rejected his request for bread because he had no money to pay for it. Urtubia considered himself lucky to have been born into poverty, saying it made him naturally lacking in respect for the existing social order. He went to work as a bricklayer.

In the 1950s, he went into exile in Paris, where he first got involved in activism and became friends with André Breton and Albert Camus. During this time, he joined the Libertarian Youth, who asked him to help hide the wanted Catalan anarchist guerrilla fighter Quico Sabaté. From Sabaté, Urtubia first learned of the tactics of direct action and expropriation as a form of opposition to private property. Together the two robbed banks to fund the anti-Francoist guerrilla movement.

=== Forging enterprise ===
Through his contacts in the Popular Liberation Front, Antonio López Campillo and Rodolfo Guerra, Urtubia was put in touch with the Cuban embassy in Paris. In 1962, he met Che Guevara and proposed to print US$1 million in counterfeit money and put it into circulation, as part of a plan to destabilise the economy of the United States. Guevara rejected his proposal, so he began working on a new plan.

He began to forge fake passports, intended for refugees to escape from Francoist Spain and other repressive states. During this period, Urtubia assisted members of the Black Panther Party in their escape from the United States, which made him a target of the American Central Intelligence Agency (CIA), and aided the flight of Catalan theatre director Albert Boadella from Spain. Boadella later compared him to Don Quixote, although he said Urtubia attacked "real giants" rather than windmills. According to Stuart Christie, Urtubia also collaborated in the kidnapping of the Nazi war criminal Klaus Barbie in Bolivia.

In 1977, he forged tens of millions of dollars' worth of traveller's cheques from Citibank, which he planned to use to fund guerrilla groups, at great cost to the bank itself. The bank was ultimately forced to suspend its traveller's cheques. In 1980, Urtubia was arrested with a suitcase full of forged traveller's cheques, but the bank continued to receive fake cheques even during his detention. The bank offered to release him if he handed over his printing press, which he agreed to. French police chief Paul Barril later compared him to the Count of Monte Cristo and James Moriarty, depicting him as at the centre of an international criminal conspiracy dedicated to funding terrorism. In contrast, French magistrate Louis Joinet praised Urtubia and twice hosted him for dinner, first at the Hôtel Matignon and then at the Élysée Palace.

=== Later life ===
At the age of 50, Urtubia left behind his illicit activities, but continued to dedicate himself to anarchist activism. He never regretted his criminal actions, describing bankers as "the real crooks". He emphasised that he never carried out robberies or forgeries for personal gain, and that he always did so to accelerate revolution. In 1997, he established a social centre in Paris which he dubbed the Louise Michel space. He died in 2020.

== In popular culture ==
His life was adapted into a graphic novel, El Tesoro de Lucio (2018), drawn by Spanish comic artist Belatz.

The 2022 Spanish-language Netflix original film A Man of Action depicts the story of the Citibank forgery scheme.

In 2024, Urtubia's autobiography was published in English with the title To Rob a Bank Is an Honor.

== See also ==
- Enric Duran
- Miguel García
- Adolfo Kaminsky
- Lucio (documentary film)
- A Man of Action (2022 film)

== Bibliography ==
- Christie, Stuart (July 2020) [June 2011]. "Lucio Urtubia Jiménez, a legendary life". Kate Sharpley Library.
- Menegaki, Maria (2021). Rethinking "Educació Lliure" An ethnographic and anthropological study of three alternative schools and educational projects in contemporary Catalonia" (PhD). Autonomous University of Barcelona.
- Orero, Eudald Cortina (2016). "The Impact of the Third World and the Armed Struggle Debate on the Popular Liberation Front: Spain, 1958–1965". In Martín Álvarez, Alberto; Rey Tristán, Eduardo (eds.). Revolutionary Violence and the New Left. Routledge. pp. 145–162. doi:10.4324/9781315645223-7. ISBN 978-1-138-18441-1.
- Orma, Álex (29 May 2014). "Life Advice from Spain's Real Life Robin Hood". Vice News.
- Trigona, Marie (5 June 2008). "Lucio, The Good Bandit: Reflections of an Anarchist". Toward Freedom.
