= Albert Meltzer =

English anarcho-communist (1920–1996)

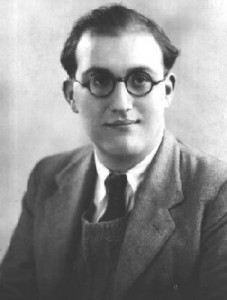
- Born: Albert Isidore Meltzer; 7 January 1920; Hackney, London, England
- Died: 7 May 1996 (aged 76); Weston-super-Mare, Somerset, England
- Movement: Anarchist

Albert Isidore Meltzer (7 January 1920 – 7 May 1996) was an English anarcho-communist activist and writer.

== Early life ==
Meltzer was born in Hackney, London, of Jewish ancestry, and educated at The Latymer School, Edmonton. He was attracted to anarchism at the age of fifteen as a direct result of taking boxing lessons where he met Billy Campbell, a seaman, boxer and anarchist.

As the Spanish Revolution turned into the Spanish Civil War, Meltzer became active organising solidarity appeals. He involved himself with smuggling arms from Hamburg to the CNT in Spain and acted as a contact for the Spanish anarchist intelligence services in Britain. At this time he had a part as an extra in Leslie Howard's film Pimpernel Smith, as Howard wanted more authentic actors playing the anarchists. In the Second World War he registered as a conscientious objector on 9 March 1940, but later renounced his objection, enlisting in the Pioneer Corps in 1945. He took part in a mutiny in Cairo in late 1946.

== Views ==
Meltzer believed that the only true type of anarchism was communistic. He opposed the individualist anarchism of people such as Benjamin Tucker, believing that the private police that some individualists support would constitute a government. (Note: Sidney E. Parker, then still an individualist anarchist, harshly derides Meltzer as being mentally obtuse and denounces Meltzer's accusation as "malicious". Parker argues that Meltzer misconstrues Tucker, who declared his willingness to repress and kill aggressive striking workers only in a hypothetical scenario after authoritarian laws had been abolished; yet as long as such laws remain, Tucker would support the workers' actions.)

== Activism ==
Albert Meltzer was a contributor in the 1950s to the long-running anarchist paper Freedom before leaving in 1965 to start his own venture Wooden Shoe Press. Soon Meltzer was to be involved in a long and bitter dispute with fellow anarchist and former comrade at Freedom Press Vernon Richards which entangled many of their associates and the organisations with which they were involved and continued after both their deaths. Although the feud started in a dispute arising from the possibility of Wooden Shoe moving into Freedom premises, there were also political differences. Meltzer advocated a more firebrand and proletarian variety of anarchism than Richards and often denounced him and the Freedom collective as "liberals". Meltzer was a co-founder of the anarchist newspaper Black Flag and was a prolific writer on anarchist topics. Amongst his books were Anarchism, Arguments For and Against (originally published by Cienfuegos Press), The Floodgates of Anarchy (co-written with Stuart Christie) and his autobiography, I Couldn't Paint Golden Angels, published by AK Press shortly before his death.

Meltzer also was involved in the founding of the Anarchist Black Cross. The imprisonment of Stuart Christie, jailed in 1964 for his part in a plot to assassinate Francisco Franco, led to the spotlight being placed on anarchist resistance and the fate of other anarchist prisoners. Meltzer campaigned for Christie's release and when he was freed in 1967 Christie joined with Albert to launch the Anarchist Black Cross, to call for solidarity with those anarchists left behind in prison. This solidarity gave practical help, such as food and medicine, to the prisoners, and helped force the Spanish state to apply its own parole rules. One of the first prisoners the Anarchist Black Cross helped free was Miguel Garcia, a veteran of the Spanish anarchist resistance, as well as wartime resistance in France. After serving 20 years in Spanish jails he moved to London to work with the Anarchist Black Cross. At the time, Albert was a printworker—a copytaker with the conservative The Daily Telegraph—and managed to get Garcia work in the trade.

Meltzer also helped to found the Kate Sharpley Library. He was involved in producing the library's publications, and helped shape its philosophy.

He joined the anarcho-syndicalist Direct Action Movement in the early 80s and was a member of it, and its successor organisation the Solidarity Federation until his death. He was originally a member of the Central London Direct Action Movement branch, but when that wound up he joined the Deptford branch, as he lived in Lewisham. He died after a stroke at the 1996 Solidarity Federation Conference in Weston-super-Mare. His biography I Couldn't Paint Golden Angels: Sixty Years of Commonplace Life and Anarchist Agitation was published in 1996, with illustrations by Chris Pig.

Acting on behalf of – and with – the boy's natural father, in 1983 he was charged with harbouring an 8-year-old boy who had been kidnapped by his birth mother from his adoptive mother on the way to school. He was acquitted. The birth mother was under the mistaken belief that she could not be convicted of kidnapping her natural child, the law having changed weeks earlier. She was later acquitted because she was under the mistaken belief that her son was being abused. Reporting of the case in City Limits described Meltzer as a 'gentle and generous soul who is one of the leading figures in British anarchism'. Police examination of seized diaries and address books led them to interview a doctor specialising in diseases of the gums, something Meltzer himself attributed to his poor handwriting and the similarity of the words gun and gum.

== See also ==
- Anarchism in the United Kingdom
