= Miguel García García =

Spanish anarchist

Miguel García García (1908–1981) was a Spanish anarchist and writer. A veteran of the resistance to Francoism he was 20 years a prisoner in Spain. In the 1970s, he lived in exile in London where, through the Centro Iberico and the monthly Black Flag, he helped raise funds for imprisoned colleagues and to sustain an anarchist critique of both the Spanish dictatorship and the Marxist left.

== Resistance fighter and prisoner in Spain ==
In his memoirs, Garcia describes his youth in Barcelona, where, with his father, he and his sisters were supporters of the Confederación Nacional del Trabajo (CNT), the anarchist trades union. When he was 11, his father— weakened by police detention and torture—succumbed to the post-war global influenza epidemic (known as the Spanish flu). He worked as a newsboy; briefly had to take refuge over the border in France after injuring a Guardia Civil officer in a rally for better pay; was engaged as a typesetter at the age of 13; and at age 14 entered the ranks of the CNT which, under the dictatorship of Primo de Rivera, was banned.

During the Spanish Civil War, with the Anarchist militia he helped hold Madrid, after the Republican government had fled, during its two-and -a-half-year siege. After the defeat of the Republic by the Francoist forces, he spent two and a half years in Unamuno concentration camp in Madrid where he befriended Josep Lluís i Facerias and El Quico. Upon their release in 1941, they joined the Spanish Resistance. They helped reorganise the CNT, smuggled guns and people, including many Jews, across borders, raised funds through bank robberies and, from bases in the Pyrenees, mounted sabotage missions against the Franco regime on the Spanish side and the Axis occupiers in France.

Their resistance continued after the Axis defeat. Led by Marcelino Massana, Garcia's group operating in Catalonia, was known to police and the press as "the Tallion Gang". Funding its operations through bank robberies, it procured arms and documents for anarchist colleagues across both Spain and Portugal.

García was captured in 1949 and sentenced to death, later commuted to 20 years in prison. Release in 1969, García wrote about his incarceration in Franco's Prisoner (1972).

== Exile in London ==
In Madrid's Carabanchel Prison, Garcia had met Stuart Christie a Scottish anarchist serving time for his part in a plot to assassinate Franco. In 1967, following a personal pardon from Franco, Christie returned to London and to the work of the Anarchist Black Cross, an anarchist prisoners’ aid organisation which took up the case of Garcia. Garcia joined Melzer in the organisation when, in the parish hall of Holy Trinity, Kingsway, in 1971 he started the Centro Ibérico as a meeting place for anarchist exiles and their sympathisers. In June 1973, the Centro Ibérico moved to a large basement, at 83a Haverstock Hill, near Chalk Farm, Camden. Here he was able to accommodate the printing press on which the Black Flag newspaper and other anarchist material was produced.

Among those prisoners for whom Garcia, the Black Cross and Black Flag campaigned was a young Catalan anarcho-syndicalist, Salvador Puig Antich. He had been in the circle of activists around Miguel Garcia in Centro's early days, but had returned to Spain in September 1973. There, after a series of robberies to fund the Iberian Liberation Movement (Movimiento Ibérico de Liberación, or MIL), he was charged with killing a policeman in a shootout. Despite an international outcry, Puig Antich was executed in March 1974.

Garcia's visitors to the Centro Iberico included the ETA leader Pedro Iñaki Pérez Beotegui (alias Wilson), who was involved in planning the December 1973 assassination of Franco’s prime minister Admiral-General Luis Carrero Blanco. There were regular weekend cabaret nights, compered by anarchist artist and performer John Olday.

== Last years ==
At the end of the 1970s, following the death of Franco and restoration of parliamentary democracy in Spain, Garcia returned to his native Barcelona where he opened a bar, La Fragua, on the site of a former forge in El Raval. Like the Centro Ibérico, this became a meeting place for anarchists and libertarians from both Spain and abroad.

García died of tuberculosis in 1981.

== Selected works ==
- Franco's Prisoner ISBN 0-246-64070-7
  - Prisionero de Franco. Los anarquistas en la lucha contra la dictadura. Traducción y notas José Ignacio Alvarez Fernández ISBN 978-84-7658-979-3
- Looking Back After Twenty Years of Jail: Questions and Answers on the Spanish Anarchist Resistance ISBN 1-873605-03-X
- Unknown heroes: biographies of Anarchist resistance fighters ISBN 1-873605-83-8
