= Sharpley =

Sharpley may refer to:

- Evan Sharpley (born 1986), professional baseball player currently in the Seattle Mariners organization
- Glen Sharpley (born 1956), Canadian retired professional ice hockey player
- Jack Sharpley (1906–1968), Australian rules footballer who played with Hawthorn in the VFL
- Tracy Denean Sharpley-Whiting (born 1967), feminist scholar and Gertrude Conaway Vanderbilt Distinguished Professor of French in the Vanderbilt University College of Arts and Science
- William Sharpley (1891–1916), English soldier and footballer
- William H. Sharpley (1854–1928), American politician

== See also ==
- Kate Sharpley Library (or KSL) is a library dedicated to anarchist texts and history
- Sharpley, Delaware, unincorporated community in New Castle County, Delaware, United States
