= Fígols =

- Municipality
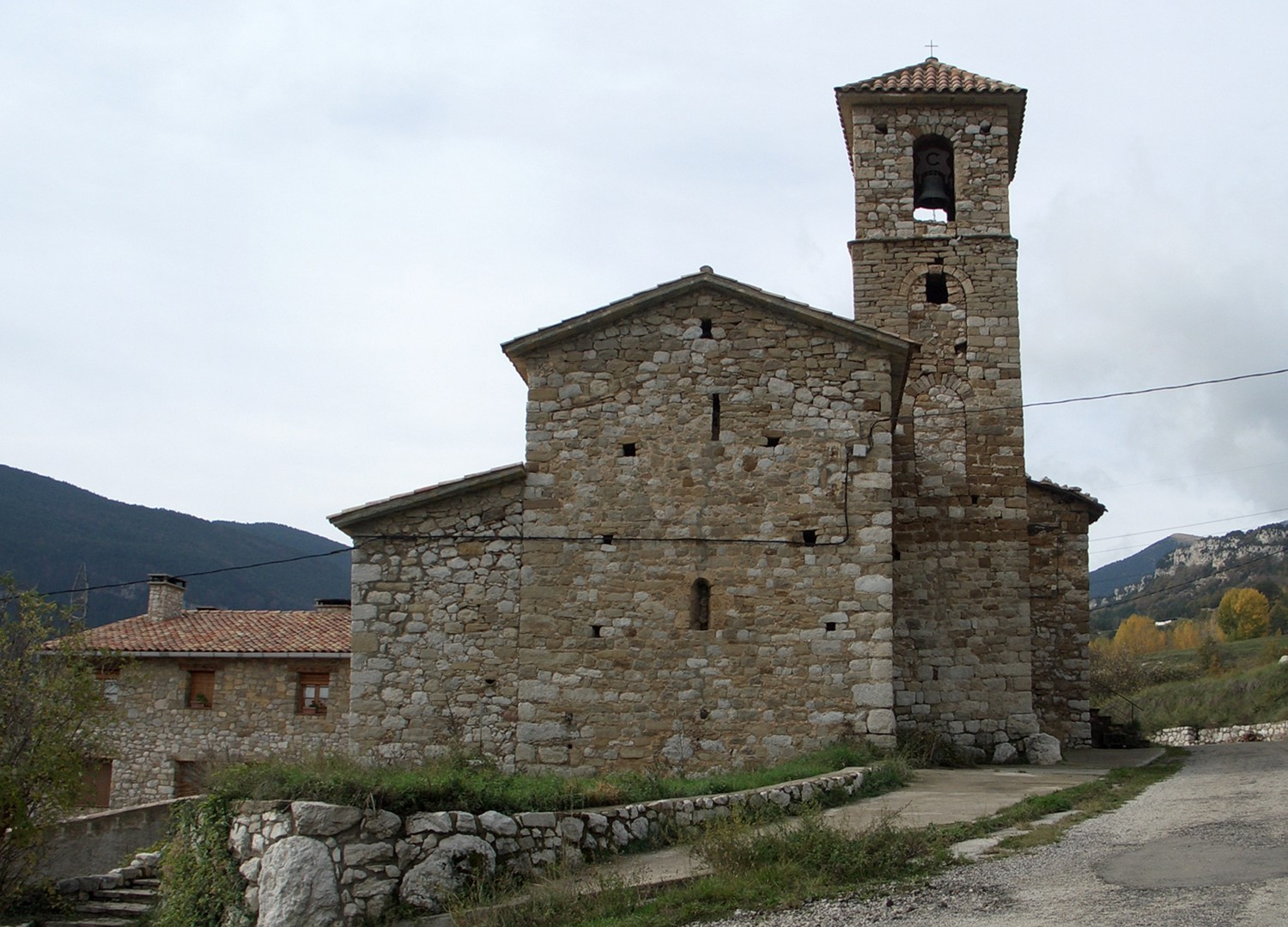

- Flag Coat of arms

- Location in Catalonia Fígols (Spain)
- Coordinates: 42°11′2″N 1°50′24″E
- Country: Spain
- Community: Catalonia
- Province: Barcelona
- Comarca: Berguedà

Government
  - Type: Consell obert
  - Mayor: Otger Calduch Márquez (ERC)

Area
  - Total: 29.3 km^{2} (11.3 sq mi)
- Elevation: 1,154 m (3,786 ft)

Population (2025-01-01)
  - Total: 40
  - Density: 1.4/km^{2} (3.5/sq mi)
- Demonym(s): Figolenc, figolenca
- Website: figols.cat

Fígols (Catalan pronunciation: [ˈfiɣuls]) is a municipality in the comarca of the Berguedà in Catalonia, Spain. It is situated to the north of Cercs, in the mountains above the Llobregat valley. Deposits of lignite are extracted commercially.

Nearby is the Cercs Mine Museum.

The guerrilla leader Ramon Vila Capdevila - last of the Spanish Maquis, who held out from the end of the Spanish Civil War until being killed in 1963 - is buried in Fígols. On 15 July 2000, a plaque was placed at the burial site of Vila which reads

Here lie the remains of Ramon Vila Capdevila. Militant of the CNT and the last of the Catalan anarchist maquis, he was involved in the proclamation of libertarian communism (1932), the civil war (1936-39), and the French Resistance (1939-45) and, for a further 18 years, the fight against Francoism. In memory of him and of all who gave their lives for freedom and the anarchist ideal

— Castellnou, The Libertarian Movement, 15 July 2000

.

== Demography ==
1900	1930	1950	1970	1986	2007
219	324	314	66	38	49
