= Benigno Andrade =

Spanish anarcho-syndicalist (1908–1952)

Benigno Andrade García
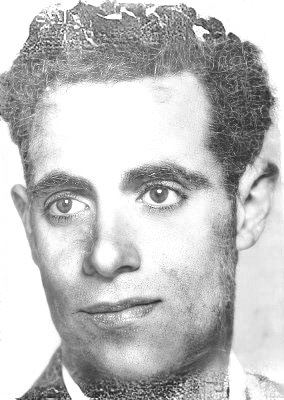
- Born: October 22, 1908; As Foucellas, Kingdom of Spain
- Died: August 7, 1952 (aged 43); A Coruña, Francoist Spain
- Cause of death: Execution by garrote
- Other names: Foucellas
- Occupation: Miner

Benigno Andrade García (October 22, 1908 – August 7, 1952) also known as Foucellas, was a Spanish anarchist and maqui.

== Bibliography ==
- Eduard Pons Prades. Guerrillas españolas (1936-1960). Planeta, Barcelona, 1977. ISBN 84-320-5634-0.
- V. Luís Lamela García (1993). Foucellas - El riguroso relato de una lucha antifranquista (1936-1952). La Coruña: Edicios do Castro. ISBN 84-7492-608-4.
- Manuel Astray Rivas (1992). Síndrome del 36 - La IV Agrupación del Ejército Guerrillero de Galicia. La Coruña: Edicios do Castro. ISBN 84-7492-584-3.
- "Vida y Muerte de Foucellas". La Voz de Galicia (in Spanish). March 6, 2003. Archived from the original on March 6, 2003.
