= Alfredo Bonanno =

Italian anarchist (1937–2023)

Alfredo Maria Bonanno (4 March 1937 – 6 December 2023) was an Italian anarchist, recognized as a prominent theorist and proponent of contemporary insurrectionary anarchism. A long-time anarchist, he was imprisoned multiple times. Bonanno was an editor of Anarchismo Editions, among many other publications, only some of which have been translated into English. He was involved in the anarchist movement for over four decades. Bonanno was born in Catania in 1937 and died in Trieste in 2023, at the age of 86.

== Political life ==
In the 1960s, a tendency within Italian anarchism that did not identify either with the Italian Anarchist Federation (FAI), which represented the more classical anarchist synthesis, or with the platformist inclined GAAP (Anarchist Groups of Proletarian Action), started to emerge as local groups. These groups emphasized direct action, informal affinity groups, and expropriation for financing anarchist activity. It is from within these groups that Bonanno emerged, particularly influenced by the practice of the Spanish exiled anarchist Josep Lluís i Facerias.

The magazine Do or Die reported: "Much of the Italian insurrectionary anarchist critique of the movements of the 1970s focused on the forms of organisation that shaped the forces of struggle and out of this a more developed idea of informal organisation grew. A critique of the authoritarian organisations of the '70s, whose members often believed they were in a privileged position to struggle as compared to the proletariat as a whole, was further refined in the struggles of the '80s, such as the early 1980s struggle against a military base that was to house nuclear weapons in Comiso, Sicily. Anarchists were very active in that struggle, which was organised into self-managed leagues." A main theorizer of these ideas was Bonanno and his publication Anarchismo.

In 1993, Bonanno wrote For An Anti-authoritarian Insurrectionalist International in which he proposes coordination between Mediterranean insurrectionists after the period of the dissolution of the Soviet Union and civil war in the former Yugoslavia. Bonanno was one of hundreds of Italian anarchists arrested on the night of 19 June 1997, when Italian security forces carried out raids on anarchist centres and private homes all over Italy. The raids followed the bombing of Palazzo Marino in Milan on 25 April 1997. On 2 February 2003, Bonanno was sentenced on appeal to 6 years in prison plus a €2,000 fine (3 years and 6 months in first instance) for armed robbery and other crimes. These charges were related to the Marini Trial, in which Italian anarchists were convicted of belonging to a subversive armed group whose ideological leader was Bonanno. Bonanno spent a year and a half in jail for publishing Armed Joy.

On 4 October 2009, Bonanno was arrested with Greek anarchist Christos Stratigopolous in Trikala, Central Greece, on suspicion of having carried out an armed robbery at a local bank. 46,900 euros in cash were found in the car. Bonanno was denied entry into Chile on 13 December 2013. Bonanno had planned to participate in a series of conferences in Chile. Having arrived in Chile with Sky Airlines from Argentina he was flown back to Argentina by the same airline two hours after arrival. The Investigations Police of Chile said the denial of entry was due to Bonanno's penal record.

== Thought ==
Regarding national liberation struggles, Bonanno said that anarchists "refuse to participate in national liberation fronts; they participate in class fronts which may or may not be involved in national liberation struggles. The struggle must spread to establish economic, political and social structures in the liberated territories, based on federalist and libertarian organisations." Bonanno rejected formal organisations in favour of affinity groups, although this should not be confused with a rejection of large groups of people working together to achieve a goal. Regarding this, Bonanno wrote:

One single affinity group cannot necessarily carry out such an intervention on its own. Often, at least according to the (few and controversial) experiences to date, the nature of the problem and complexity of intervention, including the extent of the area as well as the means required to develop the project and the ideas and needs of the people involved, require something more. Hence the need to keep in contact with other affinity groups so as to increase the number of comrades and find the means and ideas suited to the complexity and dimension of the problem that is being faced.

Bonanno rejected syndicalism, and contrasted his critique to that of Errico Malatesta, rejecting it not just as an end but also as a means. He elaborated:

As we shall see further on, Malatesta's position is a radical one, but we do not agree with him completely. There can be no doubt that syndicalism is not an end in itself but the fact that it can be considered a means must imply a means for preparing the revolution, not for continuing exploitation, or worse still, preparing the counter-revolution. That is the problem.

While rejecting formal organisation, Bonanno did not think praxis should be restricted to mere anarchists. For this, he used the term "autonomous base nuclei", which includes anarchists and non-anarchists struggling together. He wrote:

The essential element in the insurrectional project is therefore mass participation. And, as we started from the condition of affinity among the single anarchist groups participating in it, it is also an essential element of this affinity itself. It would be no more than mere camaraderie d’elite if it were to remain circumscribed to the reciprocal search for deeper personal knowledge between comrades.

But it would be nonsense to consider trying to make other people become anarchists and suggest that they enter our groups during the struggle. Not only would it be nonsense, but it would be a horrible ideological forcing of things that would upturn the whole meaning of affinity groups and the eventual informal organisation that might ensue to face the specific repressive attack.

But here we are faced with the need to create organisational structures that are capable of regrouping the excluded in such a way as to begin the attack on repression. So we come to the need to give life to autonomous base nuclei, which can give themselves any other name that indicates the concept of self-organisation.

We have now reached the crucial point of the insurrectional project: the constitution of autonomous base nuclei (we are using this term here to simplify things).

The essential, visible and immediately comprehensible characteristic of the latter is that they are composed of both anarchists and non-anarchists.

== Bibliography ==
Some of Bonanno's published essays translated into English include:

- "The Anarchist Tension"
- "And We Will Still Be Ready to Storm the Heavens Another Time"
- ”Against Amnesty"
- "Armed Joy"
- "A Critique of Syndicalist Methods"
- "Destruction and Language"
- "Dissonances"
- "For an Anti-authoritarian Insurrectionalist International"
- "From Riot to Insurrection: Analysis for an Anarchist Perspective Against Post-Industrial Capitalism"
- "The Insurrectional Project"
- "Let's Destroy Work, Let's Destroy the Economy"
- "Locked Up"
- "Propulsive Utopia"
- "The Theory of the Individual: Stirner's Savage Thought"
- "Worker's Autonomy"
