= A Man of Action (2022 film) =

2022 film directed by Javier Ruiz Caldera

- Promotional poster
- Spanish: Un hombre de acción
- Directed by: Javier Ruiz Caldera
- Screenplay by: Patxi Amezcua
- Starring: Juan José Ballesta; Luis Callejo; Liah O'Prey; Miki Esparbé
- Cinematography: Sergi Vilanova
- Production companies: Ikiru Films; La Pulga y el Elefante; La Terraza Films
- Distributed by: Netflix
- Release date: 30 November 2022
- Running time: 111 minutes
- Country: Spain
- Language: Spanish

A Man of Action (Spanish: Un hombre de acción) is a 2022 crime drama film directed by Javier Ruiz Caldera from a screenplay by Patxi Amezcua which stars Juan José Ballesta alongside Luis Callejo and Miki Esparbé. It is freely based on the life of Lucio Urtubia. It was released on Netflix on 30 November 2022.

== Plot ==
Taking place from the 1940s to the 1980s and primarily set in France, the plot is freely inspired by the life of Paris-based Spanish anarchist, bricklayer, and bank robber Lucio Urtubia, known for forging a large-scale scam aimed at the City Bank.

== Cast ==
- Juan José Ballesta as Lucio Urtubia
- Miki Esparbé as Quico Sabaté
- Luis Callejo as Asturiano
- Liah O'Prey as Anne
- Alexandre Blazy as Costello
- Ben Temple as Barrow
- Ana Polvorosa as Satur
- Fred Tatien as Patrick
- Phillip Schurer as Bank Director
- Josean Bengoetxea as Germinal
- Jon Olivares as Josep
- Monica Lamberti as Petite Jeanne
- Bastien Ughetto as Thierry
- Ken Appledorn as Tony Greko
- Nubel Feliz Yan as Comrade in prison
- Tomás Pozzi as Silvestre

== Production ==
The screenplay was written by Patxi Amezcua. The film is an Ikiru Films, La Pulga y el Elefante, and La Terraza Films production. Sergi Vilanova took over cinematography duties. Shooting locations included Vigo (Galicia), Catalonia, and France.

== Release ==
A Man of Action was released on Netflix on 30 November 2022.

== See also ==
- List of Spanish films of 2022
- Lucio (documentary film)
