= Stuart Christie =

Scottish anarchist writer, publisher and anti-fascist (1946–2020)

- Born: 10 July 1946; Partick, Glasgow, Scotland
- Died: 15 August 2020 (aged 74); Chelmsford, Essex, England
- Occupations: Anarchist writer and publisher
- Notable work: Granny Made Me an Anarchist (2004), A Life for Anarchy: A Stuart Christie Reader (2021)
- Spouse: Brenda Earl Christie

Stuart Christie (10 July 1946 – 15 August 2020) was a Scottish anarchist writer and publisher. Aged 18, Christie was arrested while carrying explosives to assassinate the Spanish caudillo General Francisco Franco. He was later alleged to be a member of the Angry Brigade, but was acquitted of related charges. He went on to found Cienfuegos Press, an anarchist publishing house, as well as radical publications The Free-Winged Eagle and The Hastings Trawler, and in 2006 the online Anarchist Film Channel, which hosts films and documentaries with anarchist and libertarian socialist themes. His memoir Granny Made Me an Anarchist was published in 2004.

== Biography ==
=== Early life ===
Christie was born in the Partick area of Glasgow, Scotland, and was raised in Blantyre by his mother and grandparents, becoming an anarchist at a young age. He ascribed this to his grandmother's influence: "Basically, what she did was provide a moral barometer which married almost exactly with that of libertarian socialism and anarchism, and she provided the star which I followed." He joined the Anarchist Federation in Glasgow in 1962, at the age of 16. He became active in the Campaign for Nuclear Disarmament (CND), attracted to the more militant approach of the Direct Action Committee and Committee of 100, and took part in the confrontational Faslane Naval Base CND demonstration on 14 February 1963, among others.

=== Attempt to assassinate Franco ===
On the last day of July 1964, an 18-year-old Christie departed London for Paris, where he picked up plastic explosives from the anarchist organisation Defensa Interior.

Before he left London, Christie was interviewed for a television programme with Malcolm Muggeridge, a known MI6 contact, and asked whether he felt the assassination of Franco would be right. He answered that it would; when the programme was broadcast after his arrest in Spain, these comments were edited out.

Christie hitchhiked into Spain and was arrested in Madrid on 11 August 1964 in possession of explosives. He faced a military trial and a possible execution sentence by garrote, but was instead sentenced to twenty years in prison. An accomplice, Fernando Carballo Blanco, was sentenced to thirty years' imprisonment. He served three years in Carabanchel Prison, where he studied for his A-Levels and was brought into contact with anarchist prisoners, including Miguel García García, Luis Andres Edo and Juan Busquets. Christie was later freed. The official reason given by Francoist Spain for his release was that it was due to a plea from Christie's mother.

=== Back in Britain ===
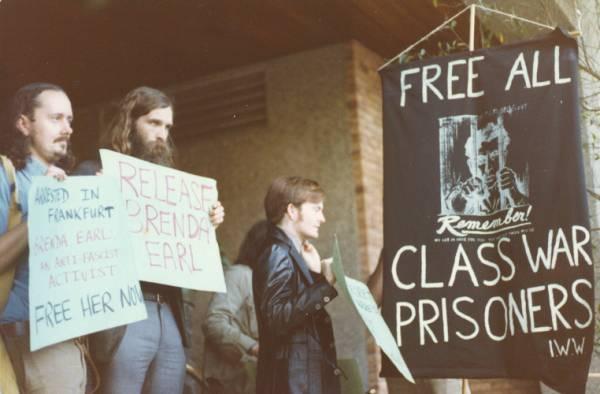
Industrial Workers of the World picket in Australia in 1981, calling for the release of Christie's wife, Brenda, from prison

After his release and upon his return to London, Christie resumed his activism in the British anarchist movement. He re-formed the Anarchist Black Cross and, with Albert Meltzer, the Black Flag newspaper and magazine, and he was acquitted of involvement with the Angry Brigade. In 1972 he and his wife founded Cienfuegos Press, which he named after Camilo Cienfuegos, the Cuban revolutionary. For a number of years afterwards, he operated the press from Sanday, Orkney, where he also edited and published a local Orcadian newspaper, The Free-Winged Eagle.

Christie edited the Cienfuegos Anarchist Review (c. 1977–1982), Refract Publications (1982), The Meltzer Press (1996), Christiebooks/Christiebooks.com/Read 'N' Noir and The Hastings Trawler, a monthly magazine that ran from 2005 to 2006. His The Christie File was published by the Cienfuegos Press in 1980. He had various writing and journalistic jobs including as editor of an unauthorised British edition of Pravda and Argumenty i Fakty (Arguments and Facts International) in the late years of the Soviet Union and the early years of the Russian Federation.

=== Later life ===
Christie attracted criticism from some of his fellow anarchists for making a gestural protest vote against Labour and its war in Iraq by voting for George Galloway's Respect - The Unity Coalition in the European Parliament elections that year, because of the general anarchist stance against participating in capitalist democracy.

Christie's wife of more than 50 years, Brenda Christie, herself a committed anti-fascist anarchist and militant, died of cancer at the age of 70 in June 2019. Christie himself died aged 74, also from cancer, on 15 August 2020.

== Published work ==
In 2004 Scribner published an updated and single-volume version of Christie's autobiography Granny Made Me an Anarchist. His autobiography had previously been published in three parts, the other titles being General Franco Made Me a Terrorist and Edward Heath Made Me Angry. Christie also wrote articles which attacked freemasonry.

Christie also co-wrote with Meltzer, The Floodgates of Anarchy. His other books included Stefano Delle Chiaie: Portrait of a Black Terrorist about the Italian neo-fascist terrorist Stefano Delle Chiaie, the founder of Avanguardia Nazionale and a member of the P2 masonic lodge, and We, the Anarchists!: A Study of the Iberian Anarchist Federation (FAI), 1927–1937 (2000).

Christie also translated into English the biography of Francisco Sabate Llopart, Sabate: An Extraordinary Guerrilla, by Antonio Téllez Solá.

== Reviews ==
Ross, Raymond J. (1981), "Review of The Christie File", in Murray, Glen (ed.), Cencrastus No. 6, Autumn 1982, p. 35.

== See also ==
- Colin Ward
- Albert Meltzer
