= Cristino García =

French resistance member (1914–1946)

Cristino García Granda
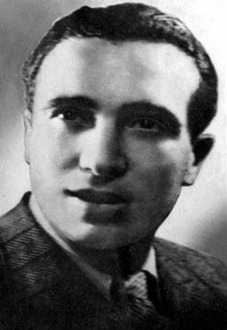
- Born: 3 June 1913; Gozón, Asturias, Spain
- Died: 21 February 1946 (aged 32); Madrid, Spain
- Cause of death: Execution by firing squad
- Burial place: Cementerio de Carabanchel, Madrid, Spain
- Political party: Communist Party of Spain
- Movement: Republican faction; French Resistance; Spanish Maquis
- Opponents: Nationalist faction; Nazi Germany; Francoist Spain

Cristino García Granda (3 June 1913 – 21 February 1946) was a fighter with the French Resistance in France during World War II. He was born in Gozón, Asturias, Spain and was executed by the Francoist regime.

He took part in the Spanish Civil War as a member of the XIV Cuerpo de Ejército Guerrillero (Spanish for 'XIV Guerrilla Army Corps'), a special unit of the Spanish Republican Army that performed attacks behind the Nationalist lines.

After the war, he escaped to France where he was part of the French Resistance as a member of the Agrupación de Guerrilleros Españoles (AGE, Spanish Guerilla Group). Highly successful in fighting the German occupiers (he took part in the Battle of Madeleine and in the attack of the prison in Nîmes), at the end of the war, he returned to Spain to work with Resistance groups (Spanish Maquis) to oust caudillo Francisco Franco. Captured on 15 October 1945, he was tortured and was executed by firing squad on 21 February 1946.

In Paris, the rue Cristino Garcia in Saint-Denis, next to the street of Émile Zola and the Joffre avenue in the 20th arrondissement, was named for him. The Quartier Cristino Garcia in Aubervilliers, Île-de-France, was also named after him.

He is buried in the Cementerio de Carabanchel, southwest of Madrid.
