= Marcelino Massana =

Catalan anarchist guerrilla (1918–1981)

- Born: Marcel·lí Massana i Bancells; 3 October 1918; Berga, Catalonia, Spain
- Died: 21 May 1981 (aged 62); Foix, Occitania, France
- Military career
- Allegiance: Spanish Republic
- Service: Spanish Republican Army (1936–1939); Spanish Maquis (1944–1950)
- Service years: 1936–1950
- Rank: Lieutenant
- Nickname: Panxo
- Conflicts: Spanish Civil War; Anti-Francoist guerrilla war

Marcel·lí Massana i Bancells (3 October 1918 – 21 May 1981), also known as Marcelino Massana (Note: Spanish pronunciation: [maɾθeˈlino maˈsana]) or by his nom de guerre Panxo, (Note: Catalan pronunciation: [ˈpanʃo]; Spanish: Pancho, pronounced [ˈpantʃo].) was a Catalan anarchist guerrilla who fought with the maquis against the Francoist dictatorship in Catalonia. He was widely known in Berguedà for his mischievous personality, as he often dressed as a Catholic priest and played pranks on the Civil Guard.

== Biography ==
Marcel·lí Massana i Bancells was born Berga, Catalonia, on 3 October 1918. Massana's uncle was a priest and he was educated in a Catholic school. In 1933, he joined the National Confederation of Labour (CNT), an anarcho-syndicalist trade union confederation.

During the Spanish Civil War, he became a lieutenant in the Spanish Republican Army. After the Nationalist victory, he was captured and imprisoned by the Francoist dictatorship. In 1942, he escaped to Vichy France, but returned to Catalonia in 1944 to prosecute guerrilla warfare against the dictatorship, as part of the Spanish Maquis. There he led a rural group of Catalan anarchist guerrillas. As leader of his guerrilla group, Massana trained and gave orders to his troops, and became the face of their movement. Together with Ramon Vila and Jaume Puig, he carried out a campaign of attacks, kidnappings and robberies throughout the comarques of Berguedà and Solsonès.

He would often amuse his comrades by parodying Ecclesiastical Latin phrases or by disguising himself as a Catholic priest when they walked through small towns; this was at a time when mass was enforced, so everyone knew what their local priest looked like. According to historian Marcella Hayes, in dressing as a priest, Massana wanted to publicly demonstrate his defilement of Catholic tradition and encourage others to do so as well. His group largely operated in the area between his hometown of Berga and the regional centre of Manresa. Throughout his guerrilla campaign, he maintained ties with people in Berga, where he was broadly popular among the local population.

On one occasion, in 1945, he heard that a captain of the Civil Guard had promised "not to rest" until he had killed Massana. Massana decided to go to a bar that the captain frequented, order a coffee while the Civil Guard were still there and then pay both his own bill and that of the captain. Working under the assumption that the Civil Guard would not recognise him and that nobody in the bar would give him away, Massana publicly humiliated the police captain, who now knew that the guerrillas had the support of the population. Days later, a member of Massana's group called into Radio Andorra, requested they play Antonio Machín's song Espérame en el cielo and dedicated it to the captain in Massana's name. This spread gossip of the prank even further.

On 11 November 1949, the Civil Guard arrested, tortured and then executed a farmer and his son-in-law after discovering they had sheltered Massana and his guerrillas. Not long after, Massana escaped to France. Towards the end of 1950, French police arrested Massana and his group while they were smuggling arms across the France–Spain border. Massana managed to resist his extradition back to Spain, and in 1956, he was released from prison. Massana then quit his career in the maquis and spent the rest of his life in France. In an interview he gave in 1979, he said he did not carry out his guerrilla campaign "for the sake of juvenile adventurism... To go on foot from Sabadell to the frontier with 35 kilos on one's back is not something one does for adventurism but for ideals." Massana died in Foix, in the Occitania region of France, on 21 May 1981.

== Bibliography ==
- "Marcel·lí Massana i Bancells". Gran Enciclopèdia Catalana.
- Beevor, Antony (2006). The Battle for Spain: The Spanish Civil War, 1936-1939. Weidenfeld & Nicolson. ISBN 978-0-14-303765-1.
- Hayes, Marcella (2015). "The Rebel Gesture: Anarchist Maquis of Barcelona, 1939-1960". The Spanish Civil War and Its Memory. University of Barcelona. pp. 63–128. ISBN 978-84-475-3927-7.
