= Ramon Vila Capdevila =

Catalan anarchist (1908–1963)

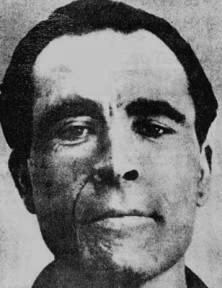
- Ramon Vila Capdevila
- Born: 2 April 1908; Peguera, Fígols, Berguedà, Spain
- Died: 7 August 1963 (aged 55); Barcelona, Spain
- Cause of death: Gunshot wounds
- Other names: Caracremada (burnt-face); Jabala (wild boar); Pasos Largos (long steps);
- Organization: Confederación Nacional del Trabajo
- Known for: Anarchist insurgent
- Movement: Anarchism

Ramon Vila Capdevila (Catalan pronunciation: [rəˈmom ˈbilə ˌkabdəˈβilə]; 2 April 1908 – 7 August 1963), sometimes known by various nicknames, including Caracremada (Catalan for 'burnt-face'), was a Catalan anarchist, member of the Confederación Nacional del Trabajo (Spanish: National Confederation of Labor), and guerrilla fighter.

== Early life ==
Vila was born in 1908 in a small village called Peguera in the comarca (roughly translated as "shire") of Berguedà, Catalonia. When he was very young, Vila was nearly struck by lightning, which gave him the facial scars which earned him the nickname Caraquemada. The lightning strike killed his mother, who was hiding with him from a storm.

In 1932, after participating in a workers' insurrection, Vila was imprisoned in Manresa and held for a few years. In the period between his release and the start of the Spanish Civil War in 1936, Vila moved around constantly for fear of harassment by the "Special Branch". In April 1936, while Vila was in Castelló de la Plana, he was approached by two officers. Vila and his cousin Ramon Rives fired at the officers, but Rives was shot in the ensuing gun battle, as well as the two officers. One of the officers died as a result of his wounds. Vila fled the scene, and later turned himself into the Guardia Civil, hoping for better treatment than he would receive from the "Special Branch".

On 18 July 1936, after the Nationalist uprising, the prisons were opened to gain fighters to put down the uprising. Vila was released, joined the fighting, and was later made a commandant in the Carabinero Corps. Vila also held the post of Supplies Delegate at the factory he worked at in Fígols.

== Post-civil war ==
Following the Nationalist victory over the Second Spanish Republic in 1939, Vila crossed the French border, to be interned at the concentration camp in Argelès-sur-Mer. However, the following year, Vila escaped, and returned to Spain. At this point, Vila formed a clandestine resistance group. Not long after, Vila returned to Vichy France to acquire supplies, and was arrested by Germans, who were by this point occupying France. Vila was imprisoned in Perpignan, but was only there a short time before the Germans sent him to work a bauxite mine. He was soon able to join the French Resistance, and put his experience with explosives to use in sabotage operations. The battalion that Vila was a member of was incorporated into the Free French 2nd Armored Division, led by General Philippe Leclerc de Hauteclocque.

Following the end of World War II, Vila primarily operated in the Catalan counties of Alt Llobregat and Baix Llobregat. As his last act of resistance before his death, Vila destroyed transmission towers on 2 August 1963 near Manresa.

== Death ==
On 7 August 1963, Vila was confronted by three Guardia Civil officers near a castle in Balsareny. When hailed by the officers Vila opened fire at them; they returned fire, shooting him in the heart. No policeman was injured. The official press release announcing his death referred to Vila as a "bandit".

Vila was buried in Fígols. On 15 July 2000, a plaque was placed at the burial site of Vila which reads

Here lie the remains of Ramon Vila Capdevila. Militant of the CNT and the last of the Catalan anarchist maquis, he was involved in the proclamation of libertarian communism (1932), the civil war (1936-39), and the French Resistance (1939-45) and, for a further 18 years, the fight against Francoism. In memory of him and of all who gave their lives for freedom and the anarchist ideal

— Castellnou, The Libertarian Movement, 15 July 2000

== See also ==
- Anarchism in Spain

== Sources ==
- Beevor, Antony (2006). The Battle for Spain: The Spanish Civil War 1936-1939. Penguin Books. ISBN 0-14-303765-X.
- Christie, Stuart (2000). We, the Anarchists!. Christie Books. ISBN 1-901172-06-6.
- Christie, Stuart (2003). General Franco made me a "Terrorist": The Christie File: Part 2, 1964-1967. Christie Books. ISBN 1-873976-19-4.
- Téllez, Antonio (1998). Sabaté: Guerrilla Extraordinary. Elephant Editions. ISBN 1-902593-10-3.
- Téllez, Antonio (1994). The Anarchist Resistance to Franco. Kate Sharpley Library. ISBN 1-873605-65-X.
