= Lucio (documentary film) =

2007 Spanish documentary film

- Poster
- Directed by: Aitor Arregi Galdos; José María Goenaga
- Written by: Aitor Arregi Galdos; José María Goenaga
- Release date: 23 September 2007
- Running time: 93 minutes
- Country: Spain
- Language: Spanish

Lucio is a 2007 Spanish documentary film written and directed by Aitor Arregi Galdos and José María Goenaga. It follows anarchist Lucio Urtubia's life.

== Plot ==
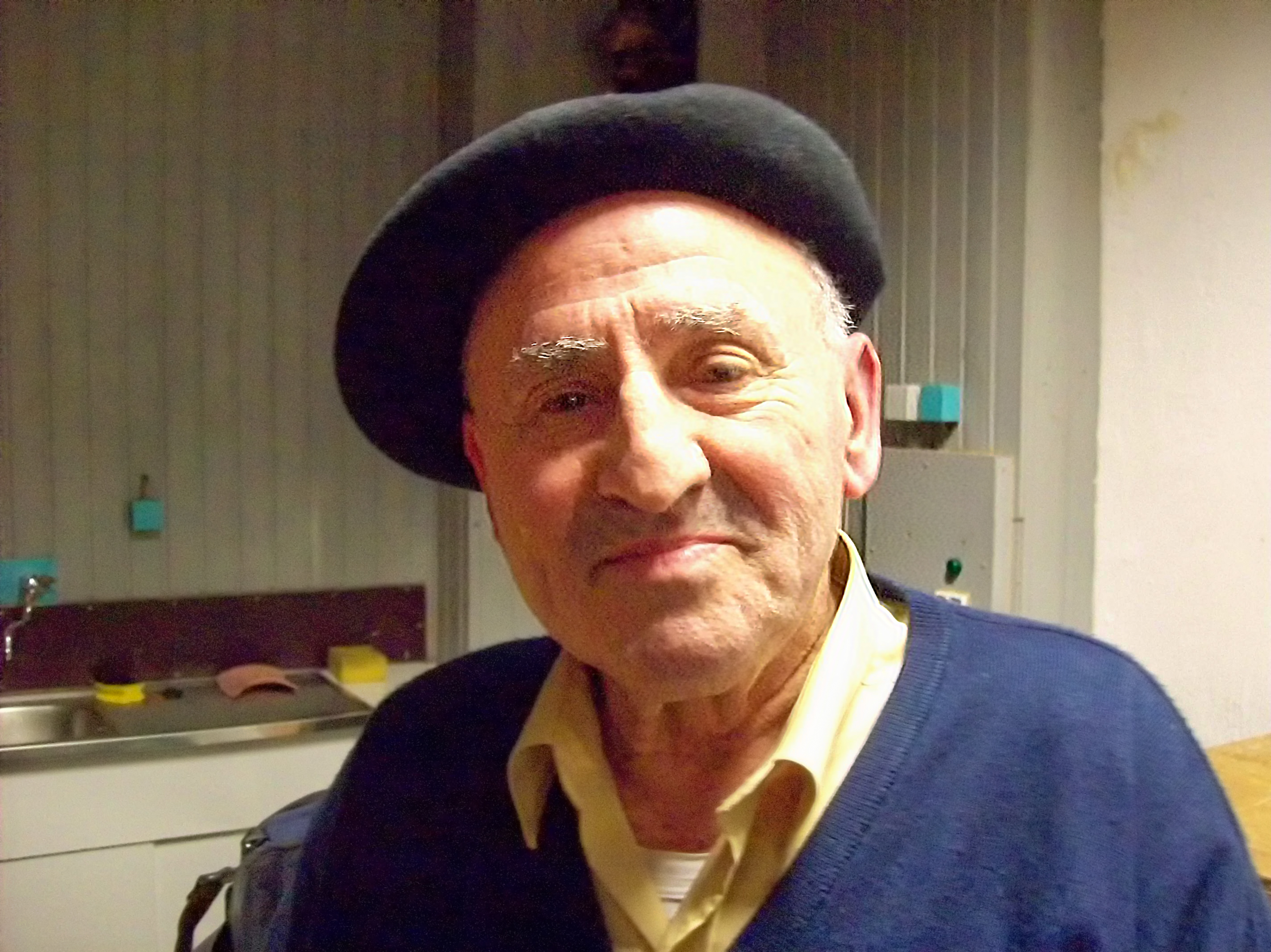
Anarchist Lucio Urtubia (pictured in 2010), subject of the documentary film

The documentary film follows Lucio Urtubia's life, through dramatisation, his own recollections and other people's statements. His father was diagnosed with cancer and was in so much pain that he went to the lengths of asking him to kill him to avoid suffering anymore. After completing a portion of the compulsory military service, he went into exile to Paris, where he met members of the Confederación Nacional del Trabajo trade union. A bricklayer, Urtubia managed to forge traveller's cheques and defrauded Citibank.

== Production ==
The script was written by Aitor Arregi Galdos and José María Goenaga. The documentary film was a Moriarti Produkzioak, Irusoin and ETB production.

== Release ==
The documentary film had its world premiere in the Zabaltegi section of the 55th San Sebastián International Film Festival.

== Reception ==
Diego Galán, writing for El País, considered the documentary to be "magnificent".

== Accolades ==
Year	Award	Category	Nominee(s)	Result	Ref.
2008	22nd Goya Awards	Best Documentary		Nominated	

== See also ==
- A Man of Action (2022 film)
- List of Spanish films of 2007
