= Killing a Mouse on Sunday =

1961 novel

- First edition
- Author: Emeric Pressburger
- Language: English
- Genre: Thriller
- Publisher: William Collins, Sons
- Publication date: 1961
- Publication place: United Kingdom
- Media type: Print

Killing a Mouse on Sunday is a 1961 thriller novel by the British-Hungarian writer Emeric Pressburger, best known as a film producer. In Francoist Spain a Civil Guard officer attempts to lure a notorious exiled guerrilla fighter back across the border from France.

The anarchist Quico Sabaté's death inspired the book.

== Adaptation ==
In 1964 it was adapted into a Hollywood film Behold a Pale Horse directed by Fred Zinnemann and starring Gregory Peck, Anthony Quinn, and Omar Sharif.

== Bibliography ==
- Goble, Alan. The Complete Index to Literary Sources in Film. Walter de Gruyter, 1999.
