= Cercs =

- Municipality
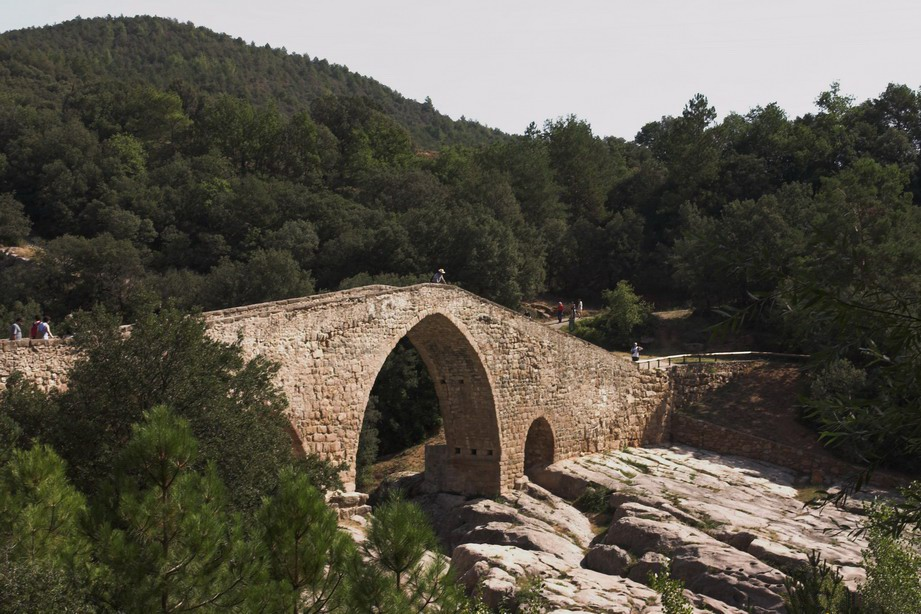
- Pedret bridge

- Flag Coat of arms

- Location in Catalonia Cercs (Spain)
- Coordinates: 42°8′53″N 1°51′43″E
- Country: Spain
- Community: Catalonia
- Province: Barcelona
- Comarca: Berguedà

Government
  - Mayor: Jesus Calderer Palau (2015) (CiU)

Area
  - Total: 47.4 km^{2} (18.3 sq mi)
- Elevation: 650 m (2,130 ft)

Population (2025-01-01)
  - Total: 1,236
  - Density: 26.1/km^{2} (67.5/sq mi)
- Demonym(s): Cercorí, cercorina
- Website: www.cercs.cat

Cercs (Catalan pronunciation: [ˈseɾks]) is a municipality in the comarca of Berguedà in Catalonia. It is situated on the right bank of the Llobregat river above the Baells reservoir. It is the site of an important power station which burns the lignite extracted at Fígols and Saldes. The town is served by the C-1411 road between Berga and the Cadí tunnel.

The Pre-Romanesque church of Sant Quirze de Pedret is the source of two painted conjunts, which are now displayed at the diocesan museum in Solsona and in the Museu Nacional d'Art de Catalunya in Barcelona. The remains of the monastery of Sant Salvador de la Vedella stand on a rocky islet in the Baells reservoir. The Cercs Mine Museum is located in the Sant Corneli colony, in the Cercs municipal area.

== Demography ==
1900	1930	1950	1970	1986	2007
965	1365	863	597	1827	1331
