= Chris Pig =

British printmaker

Chris Pig is a British artist printmaker known for politically astute prints that combine of expanses of black ink with carefully worked areas of detail. His work, inspired by the formal aesthetic of Victorian wood-engraving and influenced by Anarchism, is made by engraving and printing from Lino and/or boxwood. Chris Pig is the director of the Black Pig Printmaking Studio, Somerset, and has work in public and private collections throughout the world, including Guangdong Museum of Art China, Douro Museum of Printmaking Portugal, Ashmolean Museum Oxford, the British Museum in London, Pallant House Gallery, Chichester and the Victoria and Albert Museum in London.

== Career ==
Chris Pig has been an artist printmaker for over 40 years. After studying for a BA at Exeter, and an MA in Barcelona with Winchester School of Art, he became principal lecturer in Printmaking at City and Islington College for seven years. He left to set up his own studio in Córdoba where he lived for six years before returning to London and working at East London Printmakers. He is now director of Black Pig Printmaking Studio.

== Critical response ==
In a review of a show in Atlanta, Catherine Fox wrote "Pig is a master of stagecraft. ... The crisp lines, bottomless black planes and complex details in these prints demonstrate his technical command."

== Selected awards ==
Society of Wood Engravers 'Originals' 2009 Award (joint winner with Hilary Paynter)

== Publications ==
- Ambit 196, 2009, illustration for "Listener" by Sonja Besford
- Ambit 195, 2008, front cover and "Mice"
- Ambit Magazine, Summer & Autumn 2006
- I couldn't Paint Golden Angels, autobiography of Albert Meltzer
- Despite Anything, short stories and other writings by Mark Whittaker
- Starting From Scratch, Printmaking Today, Summer 2005
- Culture Surfing, interview, Creative Loafing, Atlanta
- Beautifully Revealing, Concealing, by Jerry Cullum, Atlanta Journal
