= Behold a Pale Horse (film) =

1964 film

- Original theatrical poster
- Directed by: Fred Zinnemann
- Written by: JP Miller
- Based on: Killing a Mouse on Sunday; 1961 novel by Emeric Pressburger
- Produced by: Fred Zinnemann; Gregory Peck
- Starring: Gregory Peck; Anthony Quinn; Omar Sharif
- Cinematography: Jean Badal
- Edited by: Walter Thompson
- Music by: Maurice Jarre
- Color process: Black and white
- Production companies: Brentwood Productions; Highland Productions
- Distributed by: Columbia Pictures
- Release date: August 14, 1964
- Running time: 121 minutes
- Country: United States
- Language: English
- Budget: $3.9 million
- Box office: est. $3,000,000 (US/ Canada)

Behold a Pale Horse is a 1964 American drama film directed by Fred Zinnemann and starring Gregory Peck, Omar Sharif and Anthony Quinn. The film is based on the 1961 novel Killing a Mouse on Sunday by Emeric Pressburger, which loosely details the life of the Spanish anarchist guerrilla Francesc Sabaté Llopart.

The film's title refers to a verse from the Book of Revelation 6:8: "And I looked, and behold a pale horse: and his name that sat on him was Death, and Hell followed with him."

== Plot ==
Footage depicts the events of the Spanish Civil War and a line of Spanish refugees crossing the border into France after defeat by the Francoists. Republican guerrilla fighter Manuel Artiguez turns away from the border and back toward Spain. His friends stop him, saying "Manuel, the war is over!"

Twenty years later, a young boy named Paco asks a man named Pedro why Artiguez, who is legendary for his fierce resistance to Franco even after the defeat of the Republicans, has stopped his guerrilla raids against the Francoists in Spain. Pedro sends Paco into France to find his uncle and Artiguez. Paco tells Artiguez that he wants him to kill Viñolas, a Guardia Civil officer, as revenge for killing his father, and that his father was killed because he refused to tell the police where to find Artiguez, whom Viñolas must capture if he is to retain his rank in the Guard.

Viñolas has learned that Artiguez's mother is dying and sets a trap at the hospital in San Martín to capture Artiguez, presuming that he will go there. A typical Republican sympathizer, she is contemptuous and deeply suspicious of all Catholic clergy, some of whom collaborated with Francoist Spain both during and after the war. In return for information about the layout of the hospital and surrounding area, Paco tells Artiguez to "bump into Viñolas" for him.

Artiguez's mother asks a priest to warn her son to not visit her, as she knows that the Guard will be waiting for him. After Viñolas has laid his trap, Artiguez's mother dies, but Viñolas sends a spy, Carlos, to convince Artiguez that she is alive and that Artiguez should visit her. Artiguez is not at home when the priest arrives, so the priest tells Paco to pass the message that Artiguez's mother is already dead and that he should not to go to San Martín. The priest also gives Paco a letter to warn Artiguez that he had seen a collaborator at Guard headquarters.

Paco flushes the letter in the toilet and does not transmit the verbal message because he believes that priest must be lying. Paco later recognizes the man in Artiguez's house as Carlos, and tells Artiguez about the priest's message. Pedro believes the boy, but Artiguez cannot believe that his friend Carlos would betray him. Artiguez takes Paco and Carlos to Lourdes to find the priest. But the priest was delayed on the way, and as he is not there, they free Carlos. On the way back, they see the priest and forcibly take him to Artiguez's house. When Carlos returns to Artiguez's house for his rucksack, Artiguez asks the priest to emerge. Carlos, knowing that he is exposed, attacks Artiguez and escapes.

The priest tries to overcome Artiguez's antipathy for all clergy. Artiguez confesses that he has known all along that his mother was sick but did not visit her before her death because he is no longer as brave as he had been in his youth. Embarrassed by admitting his vulnerability, Artiguez allows the priest to go free and, after much internal debate, he decides to travel to San Martín anyway, presumably with the mission of killing Viñolas. Once in San Martín, Artiguez encounters a Francoist sniper on the roof of the hospital and kills him. Picking up the sniper's rifle he sees Carlos the informer (who is with the police in a nearby building) looking out a window to see what has caused the commotion. Artiguez pauses briefly and then shoots Carlos, killing him. Once inside the hospital, he kills several officers but is finally shot.

Soldiers and officers congratulate Viñolas on at last killing his enemy, but he asks one of his lieutenants, knowing that his mother was already dead and that a trap would be waiting for him, why Artiguez had returned. In the morgue, the body of Artiguez is delivered on a gurney (rolling past those cadavers, murdered by Artiguez), where he is finally positioned alongside his mother.

== Cast ==
- Gregory Peck as Manuel Artiguez, an aging Republican guerilla
- Anthony Quinn as Captain Viñolas, a Francoist Guardia Civil captain
- Omar Sharif as Francisco, a priest
- Raymond Pellegrin as Carlos, a friend of Artiguez, also his traitor
- Paolo Stoppa as Pedro
- Mildred Dunnock as Pilar Artiquez, the dying mother of Artiguez
- Christian Marquand as Zaganar
- Carlo Angeletti ("Marietto") as Paco
- Daniela Rocca as Rosanna
- Rosalie Crutchley as Teresa Viñolas
- Michael Lonsdale as Reporter

== Production ==
Behold a Pale Horse was coproduced by Columbia Pictures along with Zinnemann (Highland Productions) and Peck (Brentwood Productions). The Spanish government, in opposition to the film's subject matter, refused to permit location filming within Spain. Exterior shots were filmed in France at Biarritz on la Côte Basque and in locations in Béarn such as Pau, Oloron, Gotein-Libarrenx, La Brèche de Roland, the basilica at Lourdes and at St. Maurice Studios in Vincennes. The film's sets were designed by the art directors Auguste Capelier and Alexandre Trauner.

Anthony Quinn had initially requested the role of Artiguez, but Zinnemann, wishing to avoid typecasting, instead awarded Quinn the opposing role of the villain Viñolas. Several Spanish refugees were used to play the parts of Franco's Guardia Civil officers. The American leftist political activist Allard K. Lowenstein assisted by making contact between the filmmakers and anti-Francoist Spanish exiles in France. Zinnemann wanted Gregory Peck to meet actual political refugees living in France.

Filming began on June 13, 1963, and continued for more than 100 days, running nearly a month over schedule. After Columbia previewed the film for American audiences, the studio added an introductory sequence to provide background relating to the Spanish Civil War; clips from the documentary To Die in Madrid were interspersed with dialogue explaining the conflict.

=== Music ===
The score for Behold a Pale Horse was composed and conducted by Maurice Jarre. The instrumentation consists mainly of Spanish-style guitar, woodwind instruments, harpsichord and harp.

The score was originally released by Colpix Records as an LP in the United States and as a two-track EP in France. In April 2007, Film Score Monthly rereleased the score on CD (including the two unique tracks from the EP) accompanied by the score to Damn the Defiant.

The score's main theme was also featured on the 1992 CD Maurice Jarre at Abbey Road, with Jarre conducting the Royal Philharmonic Orchestra.

== Release ==
Despite Peck's promotional tours in the U.S. and those of Zinnemann in London and Paris, the film did not enjoy box-office success, and receipts could not recoup production costs. According to Zinnemann, this was because the Spanish Civil War had slipped from the memories of its audience.

Because of scenes showing Viñolas with a mistress and taking bribes, the Spanish government not only disallowed filming within Spain but thereafter prohibited Columbia Pictures from distributing any of its films in Spain. As a result, Columbia was compelled to sell its Spanish distribution arm and remained inactive in the country until it agreed to release several Spanish films outside of Spain years later. Months prior to the release of the film, Columbia vice president M. J. Frankovich estimated that the studio had lost millions of dollars for having proceeded with production against the wishes of the Spanish government.

The film was scheduled to be broadcast nationally in the United States by ABC in December 1966, but Columbia delayed the airing to prevent the continuation of the Spanish boycott of Columbia's films. It finally aired on ABC on January 26, 1967.

== Reception ==
In a contemporary review for The New York Times, critic Bosley Crowther wrote:

It is a shame that a film made as beautifully as Behold a Pale Horse and that has as much atmosphere in it as this one unquestionably has should be short on dramatic substance and emotional urgency. But that is what is missing in this picture ... The antagonists, whose hates and terrors are never made to come forth with heat, are curiously kept in different cities until the last blazing scene in the film. Their passions are academic, their determinations vague and abstract. The tension—what there is of it—is acted mainly by casual go-betweens. Indeed, it is difficult to determine just what is going on as characters move about loosely from San Martin to Pau to Lourdes—and then back to the Spanish city for the denouement. But by that time you'll likely feel indifferent about what happens ... The drama is too diffuse for excitement. As we said, it's a shame.

On the review aggregator website Rotten Tomatoes, 90% of 10 critics' reviews are positive.

The reaction to that was a disappointment, but it was justified. The point simply did not get over. I took too much for granted. I thought the Spanish Civil War was still with us, but apparently it is dead, in spite of all those refugees. There were other troubles too—with the Franco government. I was to blame for playing the Spanish Civil Guard as 'heavies.' They are sacred cows. Columbia suffered heavily through the Franco ban on their films because of 'Pale Horse' but they were wonderfully good about it.

— Fred Zinnemann

Responding to criticism that Behold a Pale Horse bore similarities to the previous year's Lawrence of Arabia, which featured two of the same lead actors, director Fred Zinnemann said: "I don't feel any obligation to be successful, success can be dangerous—you feel you know it all. I've learned a great deal from my failures."

Omar Sharif called Behold a Pale Horse a "bad film" by a "good director."

== See also ==
- 1964 in film
- Assassinations in fiction
- List of American films of 1964
- List of war films and TV specials
