= Agustí Centelles =

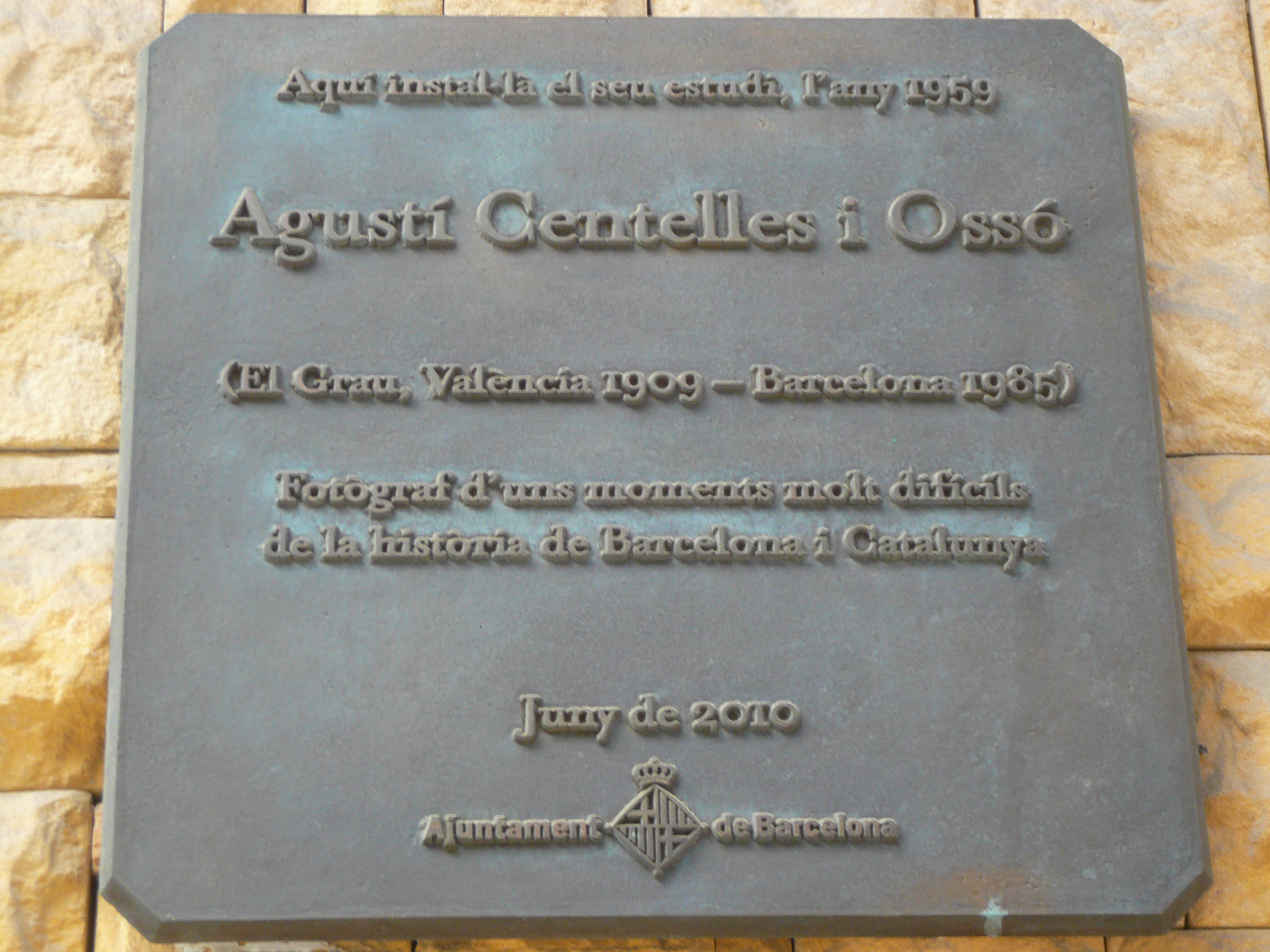
Centelles' memorial in Barcelona

Agustí Centelles Ossó (1909 in Valencia – 1 December 1985 in Barcelona) was a Catalan photographer, working on the Republican side of the Spanish Civil War. As a refugee from Francoist Spain he was interned in France where he recorded life in the camp at Bram. He is considered one of the founders of Spanish photojournalism and has been called the "Spanish Robert Capa", with a "direct, spare style" and "great skill with the miniature Leica which enabled him to follow and photograph scenes of the Civil War."

== Biography ==
His family moved to Barcelona when Centelles was a year old. He went to work as an apprentice in 1924 in the photographic studio of Ramón de Baños where he learned portraiture. A few years later he became the assistant of Josep Badosa who introduced him to journalism. He was an early adopter of the compact Leica camera and in 1934 began to work independently for newspapers such as La Publicitat, Diario de Barcelona, Última Hora and La Vanguardia.

At the beginning of the Spanish Civil War he was sent to the Aragon front and assigned to make reports on the troops at the front. He reported on the Battle of Teruel and the Battle of Belchite. Many of his war photographs had propaganda value, and were used on the front page of major newspapers, especially in La Vanguardia. He also contributed to the Catalan Propaganda Commission and managed the archives of the army of Catalonia in Barcelona.

One famous photograph from this period shows George Orwell with the POUM militia at the Lenin barracks.

In 1939 he fled over the Pyrénées to France and took with him what he considered his most important negatives. Nationalist troops seized the rest of the negatives from his house: they were bought by the Salamanca Archive in 2009 for €700,000.

In France he was imprisoned in various camps, managing to save his negatives and cameras. He set up a small photography lab in the camp at Bram, near Carcassonne, thanks to a press card issued by the French authorities and documented life in the camp in a diary and over 600 photographs.

In 1939 he got special permission to temporarily leave the camp and work on the harvest. When he got a job at a photography studio the permit became final. In 1942 he encountered the French Resistance and began taking pictures for counterfeit identification documents.

Some members of the resistance group were arrested in 1944 and the photo laboratory was dismantled. Centelles left his negatives in Carcassonne in the attic of the Degeilh family who had taken him in during his exile. He did this because he understood that he could not return home with material that, if seized, could implicate people in the photographs to the Francoist authorities. After that, he returned to Catalonia, via Andorra, and settled in Reus where he lived clandestinely for two years.

In 1946 returned to Barcelona and presented to the authorities. He was tried and was released on parole.

His political past prevented a return to a career in photojournalism, so he opted for industrial and advertising photography, making orders for products such as Chupa Chups and Anís del Mono.

In 1976 he went back to France with his friend Eduard Pons Prades to retrieve the negatives he had left during his exile. The images were exhibited and Centelles was again recognised as a war photojournalist. In 1984, the Ministry of Culture awarded him the Spanish National Award for Plastic Arts.

Today his sons, Sergi and Octavia, work to raise awareness of their father's work.
