= Cercs Mine Museum =

Mining museum in Spain

Coordinates: 42°11′00″N 1°51′10″E

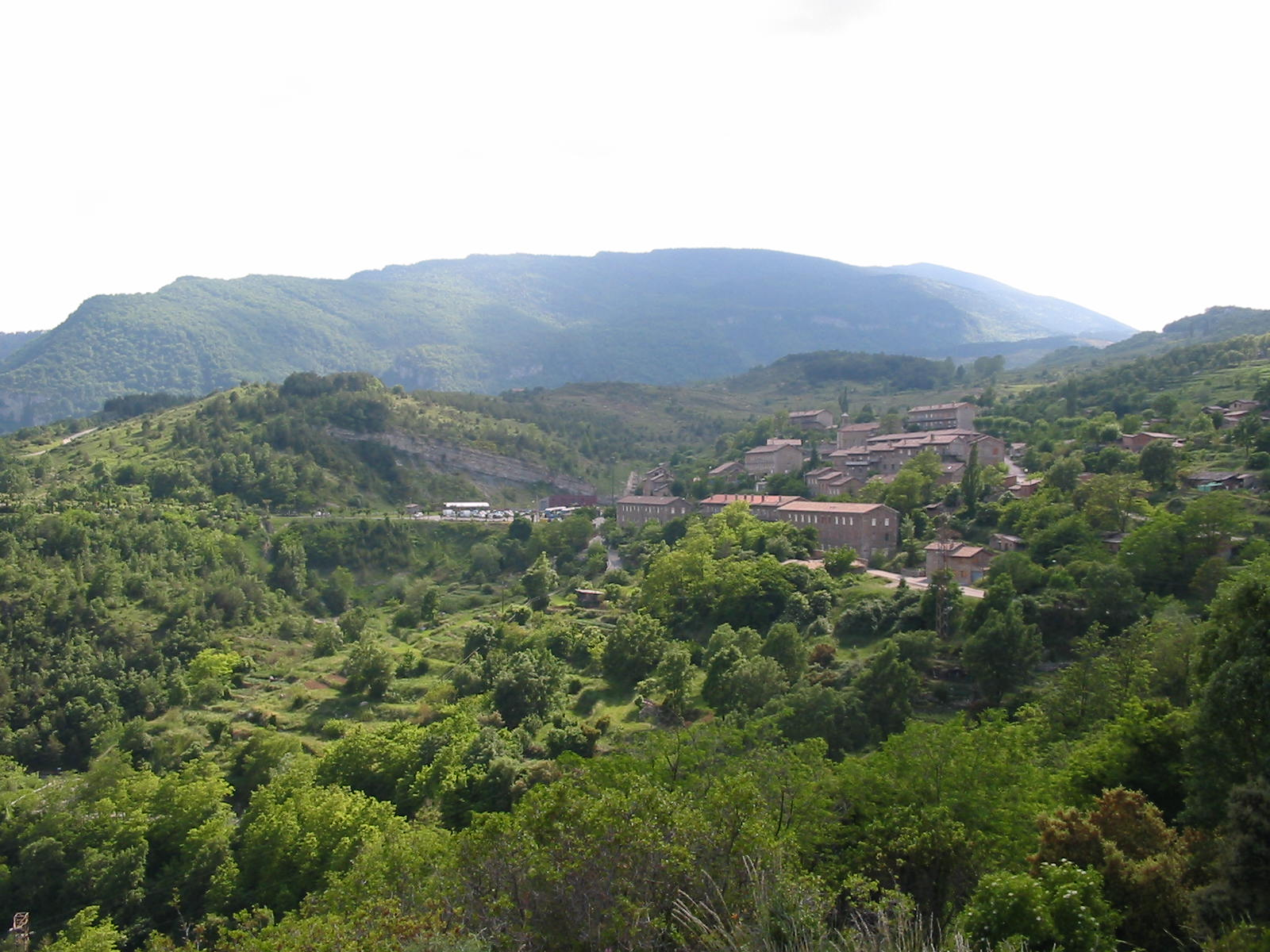
View of the Sant Corneli colony

The Cercs Mine Museum (Catalan: Museu de les Mines de Cercs) is a museum dedicated to coal mining, located in the Sant Corneli colony, in the Cercs municipal area, in the region of El Berguedà. It is a technology and history museum that describes the relationship between coal and the geological environment, the landscape, the economy and the people of L’Alt Berguedà.

Founded in 1999, it is part of the Science and Technology Museum of Catalonia and of the Barcelona Provincial Council Local Museum Network.

== Sant Corneli colony ==
The Sant Corneli colony, as were the neighbouring colonies of Sant Josep and La Consolació, was the most important mining centre in Catalonia and the one with the most extensive mines, which were located in the municipal areas of Cercs, Fígols and Vallcebre. These mines were exploited by the company Carbones de Berga, S.A., founded in 1911, which operated until 1991.
