= Spanish Maquis =

Post-Spanish Civil War anti-Francoist guerrillas

- Part of the aftermath of the Spanish Civil War, World War II, and the Cold War
- Principal areas of maquis activity (orange) within Spain, 1939–1965
Date	1 April 1939 – 10 March 1965
Location	Spain, Pyrenees
Result	Francoist victory: Decline and eventual cessation of maquis activity

Belligerents
Francoist Spain; Supported by: Nazi Germany; (1939–1944); United States; (after 1953)	Republican insurgents; Supported by: French Resistance; (1940–1944); Soviet Union (until 1956)

Commanders and leaders
Francisco Franco; Ramón Serrano Suñer; Valentín Galarza Morante; Camilo Alonso Vega; José Enrique Varela; Carlos Asensio Cabanillas; Fidel Dávila Arrondo; Agustín Muñoz Grandes	Antonio Téllez Solà; Vicente López Tovar; Josep Lluís i Facerias †; Eduard Pons Prades; among others

Casualties and losses
~1,000+ killed	5,548 total 2,166 killed 3,382 captured or arrested

The Maquis ([ˈmaki(s)]; Basque: Maki; also spelled maqui) were Spanish guerrillas who waged irregular warfare against the Francoist dictatorship within Spain following the Republican defeat in the Spanish Civil War until the early 1960s, carrying out sabotage, robberies, and assassinations of alleged Francoists as well as contributing to the fight against Nazi Germany and the Vichy regime in France during World War II. They also participated in occupations of the Spanish embassy in France.

Maquis activity in Spain peaked towards 1946, after which the resistance fighters were heavily repressed during the Trienio del Terror (1947–1949), in which instances of White Terror such as summary execution (paseos) and application of the Ley de Fugas (extralegal executions predicated on detainees' actual or supposed attempts to escape custody) took a heavy toll among maquis combatants and their supporters. Following its decline, maquis activity fully disappeared in the 1960s.

== Overview ==
Referring to the contribution of the Spanish Maquis to the French resistance movement, Martha Gellhorn wrote in The Undefeated (1945):

During the German occupation of France, the Spanish Maquis engineered more than four hundred railway sabotages, destroyed fifty-eight locomotives, dynamited thirty-five railway bridges, cut one hundred and fifty telephone lines, attacked twenty factories, destroying some factories totally, and sabotaged fifteen coal mines. They took several thousand German prisoners and - most miraculous considering their arms - they captured three tanks. In the south-west part of France where no Allied armies have ever fought, they liberated more than seventeen towns.

Also during World War II, Spaniards were involved in the assassination of Julius Ritter, an SS colonel in charge of recruiting forced labor, as well as in the planned assassination of General Ernst Schaumburg. In October 1944 a group of 6,000 maquis, including Antonio Téllez Solà, invaded Spain via the Aran Valley but were driven back after ten days. Few details of the maquis' actions in Spain have been made public because of the secrecy of the Franco government, but guerrillas, including Francesc Sabaté Llopart, Jose Castro Veiga, and Ramon Vila Capdevila were responsible for the deaths of hundreds of Guardia Civil (Civil Guard) officers, and uncountable acts of industrial sabotage. Between 1943 and 1952, the Civil Guard reportedly arrested 2,166 maquis, nearly wiping out the movement.

== Etymology ==
Mural in Sallent, Barcelona, Spain, commemorating the actions of the maquis

The term maquis comes from the French term maquis, which in turn comes from the Corsican term macchia, the maquis shrubland, a type of biome found in the Mediterranean basin, mostly associated with Corsica.

In France, the term was first used to refer to a group of guerrillas of the French resistance against the German occupation of France during World War II. The resistance fighters in these encampments were referred to as maquisards.

== History ==
The so-called huidos (Spanish for "those who've fled" or "fugitives") originated in 1936 when many people fled from the Rebel (franquista) faction to the mountains after becoming isolated in places like Asturias, León, Galicia, Extremadura, and the province of Huelva. Rebels rapidly annihilated those in Extremadura and Huelva, with only those in the north of the country managing to survive past the war.

The outbreak of World War II so soon after the civil war was a surprise to Spanish Republican exiles in France; many of them joined the French Resistance. In 1944, when German forces retreated, many of the guerrillas returned to fight in Spain. Despite the failure of the invasion of the Val d'Arán that year, some columns continued to progress into the Spanish interior and to connect with the groups that had remained in the mountains since 1939.

The apogee of guerrilla action was between 1945 and 1947. After this, Franco government repression intensified, destroying the groups one by one. Many members were killed or incarcerated, while others escaped to France or Morocco. In 1952, the last important contingents evacuated from Spain. After that, those who resisted in the forested and mountainous regions, refusing to choose either exile or surrender, fought only for their own survival.

=== Beginnings ===
The origins of the maquis in Spain lie with those who fled the advancing forces of Franco's Nationalists. The insecurity engendered by the repressive tactics of the Nationalist insurgency turned their political opponents—even many who were not politically active but simply known to sympathize with the republic—into fugitives. At first many hid in relatives' homes, but some sought refuge in the mountains. Their numbers were enhanced by deserters and by escapees from prisons and concentration camps. These people constituted the nucleus of those who decided to keep fighting from the forests and mountains.

The political character of the guerrillas was as varied as that of the Popular Front, containing communists, socialists, and anarchists. Despite the diverse ideologies, due to the organizational persistence of the Communist Party of Spain (PCE) until 1948, the Communists dominated the other currents.

=== XIV Cuerpo de Ejército ===
During the war, the idea of the possibility of a guerrilla war at the rearguard of Franco's Nationalists was proposed. The idea came to fruition at the initiative of Juan Negrín, at the time head of the Republican government and of the Ministry of Defense. He created the XIV Cuerpo de Ejército Guerrillero (Guerrilla Army Corps) in October 1937. This name was used for the Basque section of the Spanish Republican Army until the collapse of the northern front.

The short-term objectives of this Corps were the interruption of the communications and supply lines to the Nationalist troops, and the carrying out of special operations. In the long term, they were to continue the war against Franco in the case of defeat on the conventional fronts.

At the end of the war, such activities had been set in motion on the fronts of Teruel, Andalusia, Extremadura, and Toledo. The action with the greatest significance was the liberation, on 23 May 1938, of 300 Asturian political prisoners in Granada. Throughout 1938 and 1939 the Corps brought together many of the exiles of Andalucía and Extremadura; however, the Republican defeat brought the dissolution of the Corps.

=== Retreat: the French camps ===
Hundreds of thousands of Republican soldiers and civilians crossed the French border ahead of the advancing Nationalist troops in Catalonia. Once on the other side, authorities put them in concentration camps. There were 22 camps in total: seventeen in Metropolitan France (Barcarès, Agde, Saint-Cyprien, Argelès-sur-Mer, Berck-Plage, Montpellier Chapallete, Fort Mahon Plage, Tour de Carol, Septfonds, Baste-les-Foages, Bram, Haros, Gurs, Vernet d'Ariège, Rivesaltes, Fort Colliure, and Rieucros) and five in French North Africa (Camp Morand, Meridja, Djelfa, Hadjerat-OM'Guil, and Ain-el-Curak). In these camps, exiles began to reorganize themselves into guerrilla groups.

In the camp of Argelès-sur-Mer a series of meetings were held. Members of the PCE and the Juventudes Socialistas Unificadas (Unified Socialist Youth) participated. In October 1940, the decision was made to organize anti-fascist actions in France, together with the French resistance, against the Vichy government. This was the beginning of the Spanish involvement on a grand scale in the fight against the occupation of France.

=== Resistance ===
On 11 October 1940 the Vichy regime started the Companies of Foreign Workers (Compagnies de Travailleurs Etrangers, CTE), which permitted prisoners to leave the concentration camps to work in factories. This increased the possibilities of escape. Shortly afterwards, the Vichy regime established the Obligatory Work Service (Service du travail obligatoire, STO) for French citizens, with similar objectives: to provide manual labor to armament factories and the construction of the Atlantic Wall.

Those French who were released through the STO began to escape to the forests and mountains, where they came together with Spanish who escaped from the CTE. The French escapees were mainly civilians, rather than remnants of the defeated French army. From this time, the French term "maquis" began to be used to refer to the camps, and "maquisards" for the people who occupied them.

=== Formation of the AGE ===
Some Spanish refugees joined French resistance groups, while others formed autonomous groups. In April 1942 a meeting of several Spanish combat groups decided to take the name of the XIV Cuerpo del Ejército de Guerrilleros Españoles, considering themselves the Corps' successors.

In May 1944 the XIV Corps re-formed as the Agrupación de Guerrilleros Españoles (AGE, roughly 'Spanish Guerrilla Group'), because they consisted for the most part of Spanish combatants on French soil. This conveyed the group's distancing from the Francs-Tireurs et Partisans (FTP), the armed branch of the French Communist Party, with whom they had previously worked closely. By this time, the Spanish resistors had participated in numerous armed actions against the German army, even liberating various populations in southern France.

Sources vary quite a bit concerning the numbers of Spanish combatants in the ranks of the Resistance, but in general they accept a number around 10,000. After the German army was driven from France, Spanish maquis returned their focus to Spain.

=== Invasion of Val d'Aran ===
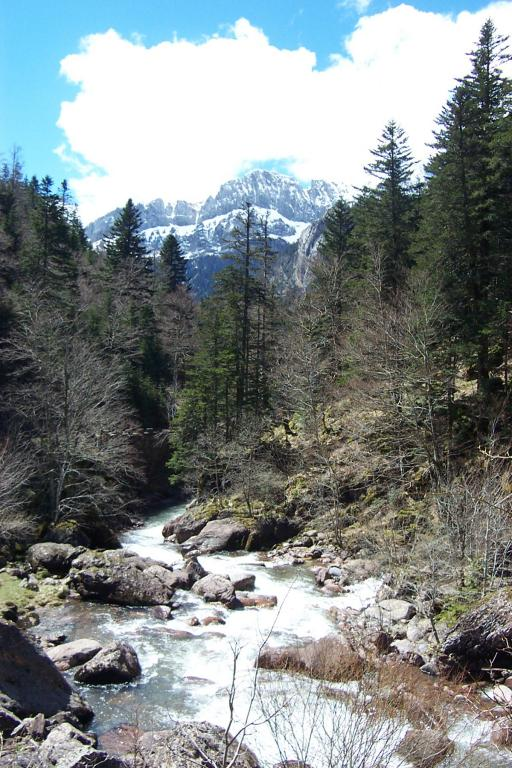
One of the valleys used as an entry into Spain during 'Operation Reconquest of Spain'

The most notable operation of the Spanish maquis was the invasion of Spain by between 4,000 and 7,000 guerrillas through Val d'Aran and other parts of the Pyrenees, well equipped and with heavy weapons, on October 19, 1944, after the German Army had been driven from the south of France. The invasion was named 'Operation Reconquest of Spain'.

Operation Reconquest of Spain was planned by the AGE staff. To carry out the invasion they created the 204th Division, made up of 12 brigades. The division was commanded by Vicente López Tovar.

The objective of the offensive was to retake the sector of Spanish territory comprising the land between the French border and the Cinca and Segre rivers. Later, the zone was declared conquered by the Spanish Republican government in exile, with the intention of provoking a general uprising against Franco throughout Spain. It was hoped that this would force the Allies to "liberate" Spain the same way it was "liberating" the rest of Europe.

The main attack in the valley was preceded by operations in other valleys of the Pyrenees during the previous weeks, with the objective of distracting Franco's forces, evaluating the situation in the interior of Spain, and contacting other groups of exiles. The most important points of penetration in the long chain of mountains were Roncesvalles, Roncal, Hecho, Canfranc, Val d'Aran, Andorra, and Cerdanya, though there were also operations at smaller points.

The guerrilla army conquered various towns and villages, raising the Spanish Republican flag, carrying out anti-Franco meetings in the plazas, as well as controlling part of the French border for several days, through which they were able to bring in trucks, materials, and reinforcements from France. However, the invasion failed to take Vielha e Mijaran, its principal objective.

In response, Franco moved into the area a great force consisting of Civil Guard, Armed Police Corps, battalions of the Spanish Army, and 40,000 Moroccan (Army of Africa) troops, which repelled the offensives. Overwhelmed by the Nationalists' numerical and material advantage, the guerrillas pulled back. The retreat ended 28 October, when the last guerrillas re-crossed the border back into France, without the hoped-for uprising.

The failure of the invasion was used by the Stalinist members of the PCE's Central Committee, recently arrived from the Soviet Union to France, to purge the heads of the party who had remained in France fighting the Germans. Most were either kidnapped and assassinated or summarily judged and shot.

=== Agrupaciones Guerrilleras ===
Despite the setback of Arán in 1944, the expectations of the exiled Spanish Communist Party (PCE) remained high, given the general collapse of fascism internationally. Guerilla activity increased throughout Spain, precipitated by the incorporation of new contingents forced to cross the border from France and the reorganization of the groups into a more military structure.

The exiled PCE promoted the creation of the Agrupaciones Guerrilleras (AG, Guerrilla Groups) in several geographic zones and coordinated the actions between them. They were modeled after the Federación de Guerrillas de León-Galicia, the first guerrilla organization of the post-war era. The most active group from the AG was the Agrupación Guerrillera de Levante y Aragón (AGLA), which was active in the area between the southern part of Teruel, the interior of Castellón, and the north of Cuenca. Also noteworthy was the Agrupación de Guerilleros "Stalingrado" (Stalingrad Group) headed up by Manolo el Rubio (Pablo Pérez Hidalgo), which operated in the Sierra de Bermeja near Cádiz, and at its peak boasted a force of 50 resistance fighters.

All these groups were extremely sectarian in their aims and organization, following invariably the strategies dictated by the Central Committee (controlled by Moscow). PCE kommisars imposed strict discipline to maintain the will to keep fighting. People in these groups who wanted to leave and rejoin a normal civilian life were most of the time treated as deserters and shot, even at the rearguard guerrilla camps in France.

In 1948 the PCE changed its strategy, and at the behest of Stalin renounced the guerrilla fight, preferring to try to change the state-sanctioned Spanish Syndical Organization from within. This began the decline of the agrupaciones, which was already suffering government repression. The Agrupaciones Guerrilleras renamed themselves Comités de Resistencia. The new orientation, however, was not effective, and ultimately a general evacuation was decreed in 1952.

=== End of the maquis ===
There were several factors in the decline and disappearance of the Spanish maquis. On one side, the commencement of the Cold War made it evident that the Allies would not intervene in the maquis' fight against the Spanish state. This led the PCE to change strategy, ending its support for the guerrilla groups in the 1950s.

The government had a policy of total silence on the actions of the maquis. For this reason, outside of the areas of maquis activity, the population had practically no knowledge of them. On the rare occasion that an item appeared in the press, the maquis were always referred to as bandoleros (bandits), in order to strip the actions of all political context.

Francoist forces steadily isolated the guerrillas. Most guerrilla members were middle-aged or older by 1950, with the consequent detriment of their physical capacities accelerated by years of living exposed to the elements and the lack of proper medical and food supplies. In these last years, many attempted to escape to France. Of those who stayed in Spain, some were sentenced only to jail (some spent up to 20 years in prison), some were judged summarily and shot, and others died at the hands of the Guardia Civil through application of the Ley de Fugas ("law of fugitives").

Although the period of major guerrilla activity ranged from 1938 through to the early 1950s, some groups continued to fight even afterwards. The end of the maquis was marked by the shooting deaths of Francisco Sabate Llopart (El Quico) in 1960, and Ramon Vila "Caracremada" in 1963, both in Catalonia, and José Castro Veiga in Galicia in March 1965.

== Areas of activity ==
Maquis were active mostly in mountainous areas throughout the Iberian Peninsula, preferring forests that would provide shelter and cover. Additionally, they had to choose areas in which they could count on the collaboration of at least part of the population, given that without local support they could hardly sustain a guerrilla group.

In areas of harsher weather, like in the mountains of León, maquis would often pass periods of time more or less "undercover" in small groups, in support houses in villages, especially during the winter months.

Among the areas of major maquis activity were the Cornisa Cantábrica, from Galicia to Cantabria, especially the mountains of Lugo, Asturias, and the area north of León; the Iberian System, specifically the area between the provinces of Teruel, Castellón, Valencia, and Cuenca; Centro, which consists of Extremadura, the north of Cordova, Ciudad Real, Toledo, and the mountains of the Sistema Central; and two independent areas in the south of Andalusia: Cádiz and Granada–Málaga. Activity also existed in other areas such as La Mancha and High Aragon.

Armed resistance groups were also active in cities, although only prominently in Madrid, Barcelona, Málaga, and Granada. In Madrid, the maquis' character was predominantly communist, supported by the PCE. Their activities did not, however, last long. On the other hand, the maquis in Barcelona were mainly anarchists. This city was the last urban place to see maqui activity. Attempts to extend the fight to other capitals like Valencia and Bilbao were unsuccessful.

The generally rural and isolated character of the areas of guerrilla activity constituted an obstacle to the maquis' objectives. In effect, given the silence of the press and government on the situation, very few and scattered inhabitants of areas of maqui activity were actually aware of the conflict. The greater part of the Spanish population was ignorant of the guerrilla war going on in their mountains.

== Enlaces ==
Sustaining guerrilla activity depended on sectors of the population known as enlaces ([enˈlaθes], literally 'links' or 'relationships'). There were others called "passive militias", and guerrilleros del llano ('guerrillas of the plains'), who supplied aid, from food to armaments (when necessary), as well as information, mail, and correspondence.

Enlaces were much more exposed to government repression. However, they made up a source of combatants, since in the event of being discovered, their only chance to avoid being jailed was to flee to the mountains. Because of this, in the early 1950s when guerrilla activity was in its death throes, groups were still incorporating new men and women.

The number of enlaces was much higher than that of actual combatants. During the years of guerrilla activity, 20,000 people were arrested for collaborating with the maquis.

== Notable maquis ==
- Benigno Andrade (also known as "Foucellas"), a Galician maqui who carried out actions against the Guardia Civil, mostly in Corunna Province. He was arrested 9 March 1952 and tortured during the following days, finally being executed in the prison of Corunna on 7 August 1952.
- Felipe Matarranz González ("El Lobo"), Manuel Zapico ("El asturiano"), Ángela Luzdivina García Fernández, and Cristino García Granda – Asturian maquis
- Joaquín Arasanz Raso (also known as "Villacampa" and "el maqui") – active in Aragón
- In Catalonia, the group of Francesc Sabaté Llopart ("El Quico") acted in cities like Barcelona. The group of Marcelino Massana, together with Ramon Vila Capdevila ("Caraquemada") acted principally in the Catalan counties of Berguedà, Osona and Bages, and the Barcelona Province.
- Josep Lluís i Facerias ("Face") and his group concentrated on robbing banks to financially support the families of people incarcerated by the Franco government.
- Casimiro Fernández Arias led a group of former Republican soldiers caught behind enemy lines who held out for nine years in the Cantabrian Mountains, in the area surrounding La Vecilla, in the province of León. Their whispered history inspired the 1986 novel Wolf Moon by Julio Llamazares.
- Manuel Girón Bazán ("Girón") – maqui from León who carried out acts principally in Bierzo.
- Pablo Pérez Hidalgo ("Manolo el Rubio") – headed various groups operating in the mountains near Ronda in Málaga province and the Sierra Bermeja, near Cádiz, in the 1940s. He was eventually captured by the Civil Guard in 1976.
- Antonio Téllez – fought in the invasion of the Val d'Aran, and later wrote biographies of Sabaté, Facerias, and Salvador Puig Antich
- Abel Paz – jailed twice by the Franco government, wrote several books on the Spanish Civil War
- Eduard Pons Prades – in 1942, formed part of an anti-fascist group in France; was in the group Solidaridad Española, initiating acts of sabotage, and worked with the group Ponzán.
- Florencio Pla Meseguer (born Teresa Pla Meseguer, 1917–2004) – alias "Durruti" and nicknamed "La Pastora" by the Civil Guard and the press, was an intersex Spanish maqui fighter born in Vallibona. Though he was active for only 20 months (1949–1951, before deserting the maqui), he became a legend due to the Civil Guard's inability to capture him and the many actions attributed to him. He was eventually caught in 1960 in Andorra.
- Xosé Castro Veiga (1915–1965) – the last guerrillero

== In popular culture ==
- Behold a Pale Horse – film loosely based on the life of Sabaté
- Pan's Labyrinth – a 2006 film in which the insurgency of the Maquis plays a central role
- Maquis (Star Trek)
- Wolves' Moon – a 1987 film about a group of Maquis members surviving in the mountains
- Caracremada – film about Ramon Vila i Capdevila
- Resist! – a solitaire game about the Spanish maquis and their battle against Franco

== See also ==
- Armed resistance in Chile (1973–90)
- Japanese holdout
- Maquis (World War II)
- Opposition to Francoism
- Spanish National Liberation Front (FELN)
- Spanish transition to democracy (1975–82)
- Spain in World War II
- Spanish Republican government in exile

== Sources ==
- Beevor, Antony (2006). The Battle for Spain: The Spanish Civil War 1936-1939. London: Weidenfeld & Nicolson. ISBN 978-0-297-84832-5.
- Domingo, Alfonso (2002). El canto del búho. La vida en el monte de los guerrilleros antifranquistas (in Spanish). Madrid: OberonMemoria, Grupo ANAYA. ISBN 84-96052-03-6.
- Moreno Gómez, Francisco (2001). "Huidos, maquis y guerrilla: una década de rebeldía contra la dictadura" (PDF). Ayer (43). ISSN 1134-2277.
- Marco, Jorge (2016). Guerrilleros and Neighbours in Arms: Identities and Cultures of the Anti-fascist Resistance in Spain. Brighton: Sussex Academic Press. ISBN 978-1-84519-752-0.
