= Bram, Aude =

Commune in Occitanie, France

Bram
- Commune
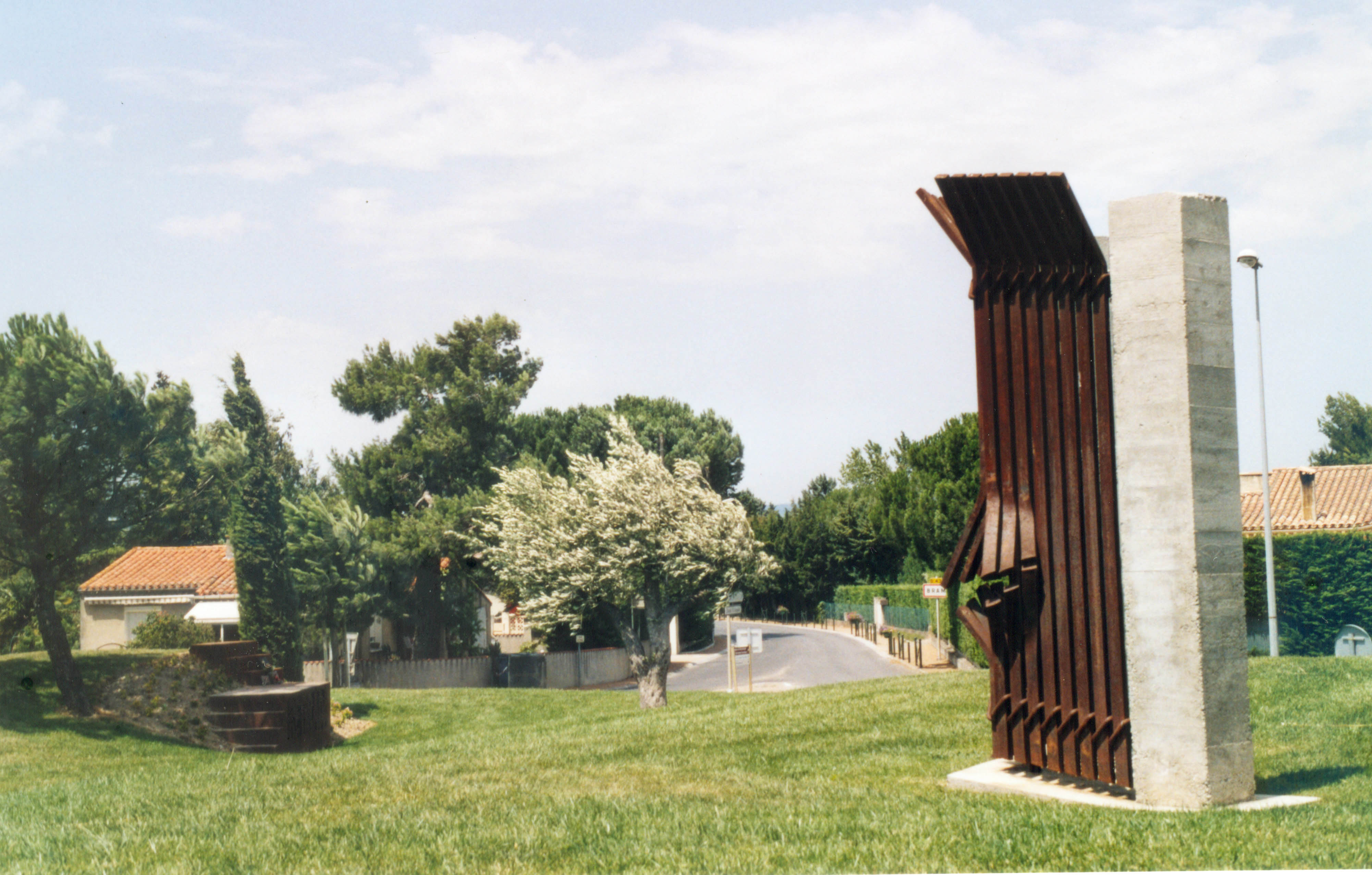
- A view within Bram

- Coat of arms
- Location of Bram
- Location within France Location within Occitanie
- Coordinates: 43°14′37″N 2°06′55″E
- Country: France
- Region: Occitania
- Department: Aude
- Arrondissement: Carcassonne
- Canton: La Piège au Razès
- Intercommunality: Piège Lauragais Malepère

Government
  - Mayor (2020–2026): Claudie Faucon-Méjean
- Area^{1}: 17.72 km^{2} (6.84 sq mi)
- Elevation: 134 m (440 ft)
- Highest elevation: 165 m (541 ft)
- Lowest elevation: 119 m (390 ft)
- Population (2023): 3,233
  - Density: 182.4/km^{2} (472.5/sq mi)
- Time zone: UTC+01:00 (CET)
  - Summer (DST): UTC+02:00 (CEST)
- INSEE/Postal code: 11049 /11150
- ^{1} French Land Register data, which excludes lakes, ponds, glaciers > 1 km^{2} (0.386 sq mi or 247 acres) and river estuaries.

Bram (French pronunciation: [bʁam]) is a commune in the Aude department in the Occitanie region in southern France. Bram is part of the old province of Lauragais, and is 790 km from Paris. Bram station has rail connections to Toulouse, Carcassonne and Narbonne.

== History ==
The CD33 road to the village follows the Roman road, the Romans settling in the area because of a climate which balanced the warmth of the Mediterranean with the freshness of the Atlantic. In 60BCE, they began construction of Bram and called it Eburomagus. Roman remains suggest the town was less round than the current town. Eburomagus disappeared.

The modern town was born in the 12th century, built around its fortress church. The only way into the village was by a gate to the east.

Bram was a centre of Cathar belief. Their difference from Rome brought the intervention of Simon de Montfort who, following a Spanish monk who became St Dominic, besieged the town in 1210. He succeeded in three days and took revenge on resistants by cutting off the top lip of all his prisoners and gouging out the eyes of all but one. For the last he gouged out only one eye so that he could lead the others out of the town to the château of Lastours. During the Saintonge War, Count Raymond VII of Toulouse surrendered Bram to Imbert de Beaujeu and Hugh of La Tour-du-Pin, royal agents, in 1242.

By the 17th century Bram had outgrown its walls and expanded in concentric circles.

In the 20th century Bram was the site of a camp housing Republican escapees from Spain at the end of the Spanish Civil War. Unlike most such camps it was a hutted camp and reserved for the old who had survived. It was one of the few relatively good camps and even had an 80-bed sanatorium. Spanish photographer, Agustí Centelles, was imprisoned in various camps in France, managing to save his negatives and cameras. He set up a small photography lab in the camp at Bram thanks to a press card issued by the French authorities and documented life in the camp in a diary and over 600 photographs. In 1939 he got special permission to temporarily leave the camp and work on the harvest. When he got a job at a photography studio the permit became final.

== Population ==
Historical population
Year	Pop.	±% p.a.
1968	2,733	—
1975	2,643	−0.48%
1982	2,650	+0.04%
1990	2,899	+1.13%
1999	2,969	+0.27%
2007	3,168	+0.81%
2012	3,401	+1.43%
2017	3,204	−1.19%
2023	3,233	+0.15%
Source: INSEE

== Personalities ==
- Albert Sarraut, two time Prime Minister of France
- Jean Cau, writer and Prix Goncourt winner
- The Spanghero family, famous rugby players

== See also ==
- Communes of the Aude department
- List of medieval bridges in France
