= Black Flag (publication) =

British anarchist publication (1968–)

- Founder(s): Stuart Christie and Albert Meltzer
- Editor: Various
- Founded: 1968
- Relaunched: 2021 as the Black Flag Anarchist Review
- Political alignment: Anarchism
- City: London
- Country: United Kingdom

The Black Flag is a British anarchist journal that was first published in 1968. Since then, formats have varied between a newspaper, which was published during the 1984–1985 United Kingdom miners' strike, and the present journal format. Publication frequencies have been irregular, varying between fortnightly and annually, with some gaps longer than a year. Initially called the Anarchist Black Cross, the title was changed to Black Flag in 1971. While known as such since then, it has had several different sub-titles, and was relaunched in 2021 as the Black Flag Anarchist Review. As of 2025–26, it has been published three times a year.

== The Paper ==
The paper was established in 1968 by Albert Meltzer and by Stuart Christie, who had been arrested in Spain in 1964 for being in possession of explosives with the intention of assassinating the Spanish dictator Francisco Franco. They considered that the existing anarchist magazine in the UK, Freedom, was too "bourgeois pacifist" and that a new, more radical, paper was required. The paper was originally known as the Bulletin of the Anarchist Black Cross before being renamed by its founders and others in 1971. It takes its name from the flag of the anarchist movement. It retained the sub-title, Bulletin or Organ of the Anarchist Black Cross, until the early 1980s. According to Meltzer, the paper was constantly monitored by the British police and subjected to numerous false accusations in the media regarding its activities, including murder and incitement to murder, links with international terrorism, causing riots, arson, kidnapping, sabotage, and conspiracy to foment strikes.

Black Flag was initially printed using a duplicating machine made by Gestetner before moving to a small printing press in Haverstock, London. Over the years the paper has used many printers, with the last issue before its 2021 relaunch being printed in Scotland. Both Meltzer and Christie had full-time jobs while publishing the paper but, in 1972, Christie moved to Scotland, where he and his wife formed the Cienfuegos Press Anarchist Review in Sanday, Orkney. Meltzer continued to edit the Black Flag with the involvement of a collective of helpers, including Iain McKay and members of the Anarchist Federation. Another frequent contributor was the cartoonist, Phil Ruff.There have been numerous editors over its lifetime. It has generally offered a mixture of articles on current topics and libertarian history, with reprints and translations of notable articles on anarchism. It did not publish in 2006, attributed by McKay in part to the fact that there had been an improvement in the quality of Freedom, but was subsequently resurrected with a greater emphasis on longer articles, which Freedom did not carry.

Until 1985, the paper was published more or less monthly in volumes. In that year, it was decided to just give each issue a number. After the hiatus in 2006, it was relaunched in 2007 by a collective that described themselves as anarchist communists. After several years of absence after 2016, it was again relaunched in 2021, this time as the Black Flag: Anarchist Review, with no number, reintroducing the use of volumes for each year. The relaunch issue largely covered historical topics, most notably in celebration of the centenary of the death of the Russian anarchist, Peter Kropotkin. Between 2021 and 2026 articles continued to discuss historical topics, although one examined the lessons applicable from past wars to the 2022 Russian invasion of Ukraine.

== Issues ==
The following summarizes the issues of Black Flag. Until its relaunch in 2021, 237 numbered issues had been published:

=== Volumes ===
- Volume 1: 1968–1970. Published as the Bulletin of the Anarchist Black Cross.
- Volume 2: 1971 – January 1973. Published as Black Flag – Bulletin of the Anarchist Black Cross
- Volume 3: March 1973 – April 1975. Published as Black Flag – Organ of the Anarchist Black Cross
- Volume 4: May 1975–1977. Published as Black Flag
- Volume 5: July 1977 – January 1980
- Volume 6: March 1980 – June 1982
- Volume 7: 1983–1985 Initially monthly and then fortnightly newsletter published as Black Flag: Anarchist Fortnightly. In addition, a quarterly magazine was issued, known as the Black Flag: Journal of Anarchist Ideas, News and Comments.

=== Numbered issues ===
- 1985 onwards. No "Volumes". Black Flag: For Anarchist Resistance, starting with Issue No. 128
- Issue 201: November 1990
- Issue 202: November 1991
- Issue 203: Autumn 1993. Relaunched as quarterly magazine with a two-colour cover
- Issue 218: 1999. Full colour cover. Annual or biannual from then on
- Issue 226: 2007. A new collective took over the paper and relaunched it again simply as Black Flag
- 2021–: Relaunched again, this time as the Black Flag Anarchist Review, starting as Volume 1 No. 1. Three issues per year.

== Archives ==
There are several online sources of back numbers of the Black Flag, including Libcom.org and the Sparrows' Nest Library and Archive.
