= William Sharpley =

English footballer (1890–1916)

Personal information
- Full name: William Albert Sharpley
- Date of birth: December 1890
- Place of birth: Bow, England
- Date of death: 1 July 1916 (aged 25)
- Place of death: Somme, France
- Position: Left back

Senior career*
Years	Team	Apps	(Gls)
1912	Leicester Fosse	1	(0)
- * Club domestic league appearances and goals

William Albert Sharpley DCM (December 1890 – 1 July 1916) was an English professional footballer who played as a left back in the Football League for Leicester Fosse.

== Personal life ==
Prior to 1912, Sharpley enlisted in the Essex Regiment of the British Army. After the outbreak of the First World War, his battalion arrived on the Western Front on 21 August 1914 and saw action at Le Cateau, Marne, Messines and Armentières. Serving as a sergeant, he was mentioned in dispatches and won the Cross of St. George 2nd Class "for conspicuous gallantry in rescuing and bringing in across the open and under fire, a wounded NCO" in late 1914. In February 1916, Sharpley won the Distinguished Conduct Medal for bringing another wounded man in under fire, southeast of Hébuterne. He was killed on the first day of the Somme in an area between Serre-lès-Puisieux and Beaumont-Hamel and is commemorated on the Thiepval Memorial. As a result of his death, Sharpley's sister Kate became an anarchist campaigner.

== Career statistics ==
Appearances and goals by club, season and competition
Club	Season	League			FA Cup		Total	
Club	Season	Division	Apps	Goals	Apps	Goals	Apps	Goals
Leicester Fosse	1911–12	Second Division	1	0	—		1	0
Career total			1	0	—		1	0
