= Antonio Téllez Solà =

Catalan guerrilla, historian and journalist (1921–2005)

Antonio Téllez
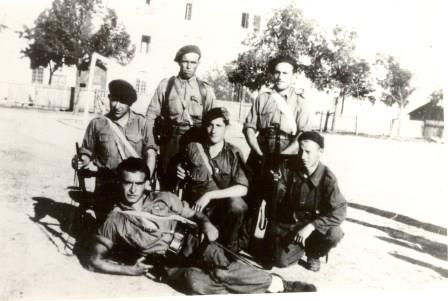
- Téllez (bottom) with his guerrilla unit in 1944
- Born: Antoni Téllez Solà; 18 January 1921; Tarragona, Catalonia, Spain
- Died: 27 March 2005 (aged 84); Perpinyà, Pyrénées-Orientales, France
- Occupations: Historian, journalist
- Organizations: Libertarian Youth, National Confederation of Labour
- Movement: Anarchism, anti-fascism
- Partner: Moni
- Children: 2
- Military career
- Allegiance: Spanish Republic
- Service: Spanish Republican Army (1939); Spanish Maquis (1944)
- Service years: 1939–1944
- Rank: Lieutenant
- Conflicts: Spanish Civil War; Catalonia Offensive; World War II; Liberation of France; Invasion of Val d'Aran

Antoni Téllez Solà (Note: Also known by the Spanish: Antonio Téllez Solá.) (1921–2005) was a Catalan anarchist guerrilla, historian and journalist. Born in Tarragona, he was too young to join the confederal militias during the Spanish Civil War and was forced to flee to France by the Catalonia Offensive. The Vichy government drafted him into a forced labour company, within which he worked until his escape in 1944. He subsequently joined up with the Spanish Maquis, participating in the Liberation of France and in the abortive invasion of Val d'Aran. After the war, he began writing history books about the maquis, continuing to work on the subject until his death.

== Biography ==
Antoni Téllez Solà was born on 18 January 1921, in the Catalan city of Tarragona. After completing his secondary education, in January 1936, he began an apprenticeship as a carpenter. As fascism was on the rise in the country, he also joined the Libertarian Youth. Following the outbreak of the Spanish Civil War, he attempted to join the Aguiluchos Column, but he was rejected due to his young age. When he turned 18, in January 1939, he was conscripted into the Spanish Republican Army to fight against the Catalonia Offensive. The following month, he fled to France and was held in an internment camp for 18 months.

In the wake of the Battle of France, the Vichy government drafted him into a forced labour company, within which he contributed to the refurbishment of a barracks in Mende. When Téllez demanded a pay rise, in February 1943, the French police transferred him to work in a mine in Le Collet-de-Dèze. There he was fined three days' pay for missing a day of work, and when he requested repayment, his demands were backed by German officers who had fought in the Spanish Civil War. He was later put to work fortifying the ports of Sète and Agde, and at a hospital in Avairon. In March 1944, he was ordered to report to Rodès for transfer to Nazi Germany, as part of the Service du travail obligatoire (STO). Téllez escaped to La Cavalariá, where he joined the Avairon branch of the French Resistance. Under the nom de guerre of Tarra (short for Tarragona), he linked up with the Spanish Maquis, with whom he participated in the liberation of Rodès on 10 September 1944.

Téllez then joined the Spanish National Union, which began planning an offensive against Francoist Spain with an invasion of Val d'Aran. He was appointed as a lieutenant and given command of a small platoon, which crossed over the France–Spain border into the Val d'Aran on 16 October 1944. After hiding out in an abandoned mine, on 19 October, he went to Salardú, where his unit attacked the local garrison of the Civil Guard and Spanish Army. After 8 hours of fighting, they withdrew once Francoist reinforcements arrived. Short on supplies and facing adverse weather conditions, they fled back over the border to Sent Gironç. Téllez was ordered to convince the anarchist guerrillas to return, but he refused to continue fighting, believing the operation to have been futile. He and the other anarchists left and the UNE sentenced them at a court martial for desertion.

Téllez moved to Tolosa, where he clandestinely established an arms depot for the maquis. He also contributed to the anarchist publications Ruta and Solidaridad Obrera. In 1946, he attempted to link up with the underground anarchist movement in Spain. He spent three months there, but was unable to convince the leadership of the National Confederation of Labour (CNT) to support the maquis. After the Spanish authorities murdered his friend Josep Lluís Facerias in Barcelona, in August 1957, Téllez launched the anarchist publication Atalaya. After the subsequent assassination of Quico Sabaté in 1960, Téllez withdrew from activism and turned to writing as a historian and journalist. He moved to Paris, where he worked for Agence France-Presse (AFP) until 1986. During this time, he wrote several books about the maquis and the resistance to Francoism. He then moved to Ceret, then on to Perpinyà. In February 2005, he was hospitalised by a pulmonary embolism, making him anxious that he would not live to see the publication of his book about Agustín Remiro. Antonio Téllez Solà died on 27 March 2005, leaving behind his partner and two children.

== Selected works ==
- The Anarchist Resistance to Franco (1994) ISBN 1-873605-65-X
- The Anarchist Pimpernel Francisco Ponzán Vidal, 1936-1944 (1997) ISBN 1-901172-04-X
- Sabaté: Guerrilla Extraordinary (1998) ISBN 1-902593-10-3
- The Assassination Attempt on Franco from the Air: 1948 (2006) ISBN 1-873605-80-3
- Anarchist International Action Against Francoism From Genoa 1949 to The First Of May Group (2010) ISBN 978-1-873605-85-1

== Bibliography ==
- Ballarín Aured, Manuel (18 April 2005). "Antonio Téllez Solá, A Historian in the Service of the Forgotten". Rojo y Negro. Translated by Sharkey, Paul. ISSN 1138-1019 – via Kate Sharpley Library.
- Christie, Stuart (9 May 2005). "Antonio Téllez Solà". The Guardian. ISSN 0261-3077.
