= Kate Sharpley Library =

Library dedicated to anarchist texts and history

KSL
- Kate Sharpley Library
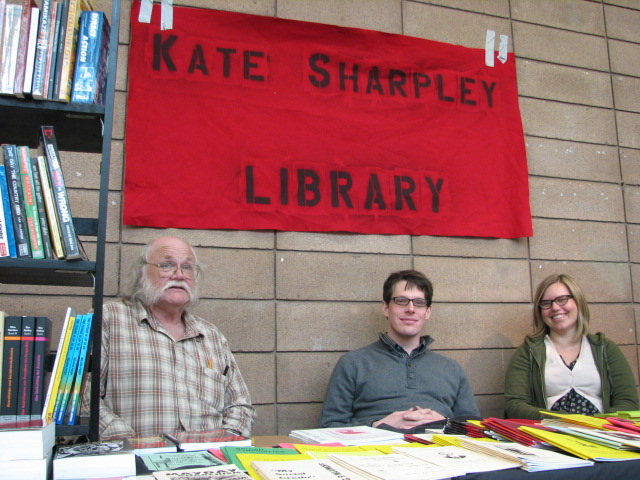
- Anarchist historian Barry Pateman (left), at the Kate Sharpley Library booth at the 2011 Bay Area Anarchist Bookfair.
- Location: Northern California, United States
- Established: 1979

Collection
- Items collected: As of 2010: over 2,000 books 3,000 pamphlets 2,000 periodicals in the English language. Large French, Italian and Spanish sections. Publications in most languages, including Esperanto.

Other information
- Website: katesharpleylibrary.net

The Kate Sharpley Library (KSL) is a library dedicated to anarchist texts and history. Started in 1979 and reorganized in 1991, it currently holds around ten thousand English language volumes, pamphlets and periodicals in its archive.

== Namesake ==
The Kate Sharpley Library was named after an anarchist and anti-war activist who was born in Deptford, in South London in 1891. She worked in a munitions factory and was active in the shop stewards movement. During the World War I, her brother William Sharpley was lost during a battle between Serre-lès-Puisieux and Beaumont-Hamel. Her father was killed in action and her boyfriend was listed as missing believed killed, although she suspected he had been shot for mutiny. At the age of 22, when called to receive her family's medals from Queen Mary she threw the medals back at the Queen, saying 'If you like them so much you can have them'.

The Queen's face was scratched, Kate Sharpley was beaten by police, and imprisoned for a few days. However, no charges were brought against her. But she lost her job. After marrying in 1922, she dropped out of anarchist activities until a chance encounter with Albert Meltzer at a train station during an anti-fascist action. This led to her meeting many younger activists and so, when Brixton anarchists came to name the archives they had collected from the movement, '[t]hey resisted the temptation to call the archives after a famous person and named it the Kate Sharpley Library'. (Note: Goodway 2012, p. 362 commented: 'it was seen to be singularly appropriate to name the library after a working-class woman who had been previously unknown.')

== Holdings ==
The library has texts in English and other languages, near complete collections of several anarchist newspapers, and collections of reports and literature from various anarchist organisations. It is maintained by donations, and money made from sales of pamphlets and other publications. As of 2014 it was receiving one or two in-person visits per month and the bulk of the research requests arrived by email.

== Locations ==
The library was begun in the 121 Centre, a squat in Railton Road, Brixton, South London in 1979 by a collective which included anarchist Albert Meltzer. It had both lending and reference sections. In 1984 the centre was raided by the police. Consequently the library was moved for safety across the road to a different squat. Barry Pateman, a self-described '"independent" scholar' who around that time was undertaking research into the history of anarchism, recalled in an interview:

'... I think in 1991, I learnt from Albert Meltzer that the KSL was in search of a new home.'

At the time Pateman was living in Stamford, Lincolnshire. He later recalled that the library was transported from London which needed two trips of a minibus which was full of boxes. Consequently:

'The Library filled up one room with boxes and I put others on the floor, on tables etc. Initially I began to sort what I could. English language books, papers, newspapers, pamphlets, correspondence, ephemera in one place etc. Other languages all grouped together as well. As I did this I chatted to Albert about future plans. He was very keen on KSL becoming a little publishing house by publishing some of the material it had. Col [Longmore] and Ineke [Frencken] had produced some nice Bulletins and he was keen to make these a regular feature. That was the genesis of the Bulletin of the KSL.'

Moran (2014) observed that when the library was moved to the safety of Pateman's home, its focus shifted towards being a special collection and archive. After eight years, Pateman moved to the United States and in 1991 the library was moved again, to a renovated barn at his home in Northern California.

== Publications ==
As well as preserving the physical artifacts of anarchist history, the library also publishes books and pamphlets on anarchism and anarchist history, covering many subjects that would otherwise be forgotten. Its activities are recounted in its regular bulletin, which is available online and sent to its financial supporters.

Authors that the library has published or re-published include Miguel Garcia, Albert Meltzer, David Nicoll, Abel Paz, Antonio Téllez, and Bartolomeo Vanzetti.

== See also ==
- List of anarchist organizations
- Anarchist archives
- Anarchism in the United Kingdom
