= Eduard Pons Prades =

Catalan historian and journalist (1920-2007)

Eduard Pons
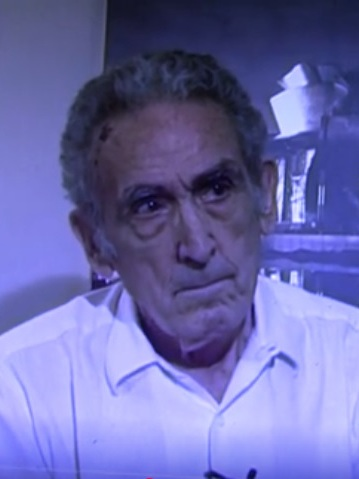
- Photo of Eduardo Pons Prades
- Born: Eduard Pons Prades; 19 December 1920; Barcelona, Catalonia, Spain
- Died: 28 May 2007 (aged 86); Barcelona, Catalonia, Spain
- Other name: Floreado Barsino
- Occupations: Historian, journalist
- Movement: Anarchism in Spain
- Military career
- Allegiance: Spanish Republic (1936-1939); Free France (1940-1944)
- Service: Spanish Republican Army; French resistance (1936-1939); Free France (1940-1944)
- Service years: 1936-1946
- Conflicts: Spanish Civil War; Siege of Madrid; Battle of the Ebro; Catalonia Offensive; World War II

Eduard Pons Prades (1920 – 2007) was a Catalan, fighter, historian and journalist. He fought in the Spanish Civil War and French resistance, and went on to write several history books about both conflicts.

== Biography ==
Eduard Pons Prades was born in 1920. He was the son of Valencian trade unionists from Horta Nord, who had settled in Barcelona. Pons worked in the wood industry, which was collectivised at the outset of the Spanish Revolution of 1936. At the age of 16, he volunteered to fight in the Spanish Civil War. He fought in the siege of Madrid and the battle of the Ebro, and in 1938, he was wounded during the Catalonia Offensive.

In early 1939, as the Nationalists advanced through Catalonia, Pons put together a team to evacuate 20,000 wounded people from Spain. When he arrived in France and told the authorities that the Nationalists had murdered wounded Republicans in their hospital beds, he was met with disbelief. In the French concentration camps where Spanish refugees were interned, Pons reported that disease spread rapidly, with many internees suffering from dysentery, pneumonia, scabies or mental disorders.

Following the battle of France, Pons joined the French resistance and fought against the Vichy regime in Aude. While fighting in the resistance, in 1942, he met the Catalan photographer Agustí Centelles in Carcassonne. After the Allied victory in World War II, Pons clandestinely returned to Francoist Spain. He was detained there in January 1946, but he managed to escape and fled back to France.

He lived in France until 1964, when he decided to return to Spain. Pons then settled down and became a historian, writing about the recent history of Spain. He authored numerous history books and a novel, and contributed to several publications. After the Spanish transition to democracy, in 1976, Pons and Centelles went back to Carcassone and recovered an archive of photographs Centelles had taken during the civil war. Together, they organised the material into a book, which they published in 1979. In the book, Pons celebrated the anarchist militias that defeated the military coup in Barcelona, placing Catalan workers at the forefront of his depiction of the war and revolution. In August 1981, while Pons was working as a journalist for Diario de Barcelona, he was interviewed by Martha A. Ackelsberg about his experiences during the Revolution.

On 1982, Pons published the book, El mensaje de otro mundo, The message of anaother world, when he describes an encounter with seven extraterrestrial beings in 1962.

Eduard Pons Prades died on the morning of 28 May 2007, in Barcelona's Hospital de Sant Pau.

== Selected works ==
- La Venganza (1966)
- Un soldado de la República: Memorias de La Guerra Civil espanola, 1936-1939 (Madrid, 1974)
- Anys de mort i esperança (Barcelona, 1979), with Agustí Centelles ISBN 84-7475-020-2
- Morir por la libertad: Españoles en los campos de exterminio nazis (1995) ISBN 84-8218-012-6
- El Holocausto de los Republicanos Españoles: Vida y Muerte, en los Campos de Exterminio Alemanes (1940–1945) (2005) ISBN 84-96326-24-1
- Guerrillas españolas: 1936-1960 ISBN 84-320-5634-0
- Los niños republicanos en la guerra de España ISBN 84-473-4406-1
- Un soldado de la República: Itinerario ibérico de un joven revolucionario, with Leopoldo de Luis ISBN 84-226-4394-4
- Los republicanos en la II Guerra Mundial ISBN 84-473-4443-6
- Los vencidos y el exilio ISBN 84-226-2799-X
- El mensaje de otros mundos (1982) ISBN 84-320-3636-6

== Bibliography ==
- Ackelsberg, Martha A. (2005) [1991]. Free Women of Spain: Anarchism and the Struggle for the Emancipation of Women. Oakland, California: AK Press. ISBN 1-902593-96-0. LCCN 2003113040. OCLC 63382446.
- Eaude, Michael (2001). "Trip to Collioure". Index on Censorship. 30 (2): 181–185. doi:10.1080/03064220108536925.
- Ferré Panisello, Teresa (2011). "Agustí Centelles: Testimony, Image, and Text. Bram, 1939". Catalan Review. 25 (25): 149–165. doi:10.3828/catr.25.1.149.
- Stafford, Katherine O. (2015). "Photojournalism and Memory: Agustí Centelles's Legacy". Narrating War in Peace: The Spanish Civil War in the Transition and Today. Springer. pp. 21–52. doi:10.1057/9781137496683_2. ISBN 978-1-349-56733-1.
- "Fallece Eduard Pons Prades, combatiente por la República y fundador de Alfaguara" [Eduard Pons Prades dies, combatant for the Republic and founder of Alfaguara]. La Vanguardia (in Spanish). 28 May 2007. Archived from the original on 22 September 2007.
