= Josep Lluís Facerias =

Catalan anarchist (1920–1957)

Personal details
- Born: 6 January 1920 Barcelona, Catalonia, Spain
- Died: 30 August 1957 (aged 37) Sant Andreu, Barcelona, Catalonia, Spain
- Resting place: Montjuïc Cemetery, Barcelona

Military service
- Allegiance: Second Spanish Republic
- Years of service: 1936-1939
- Unit: Ascaso Column
- Battles/wars: Spanish Civil War; Aragon Offensive

Josep Lluís Facerias (1920–1957) was a Spanish insurrectionary anarchist. He was born in Barcelona, Catalonia, Spain, on 6 January 1920. He was nicknamed 'Face'. When the military revolt took place in July 1936, Facerias was already affiliated to the National Confederation of Labour (CNT) and to the Libertarian Youth. He fought on the Aragon front throughout the war in the Ascaso Column (28th Division) and in other units. In the last battles in Catalonia he was taken prisoner and Facerias was in various concentration camps and work gangs. When he was released at the end of 1945 he joined, in Barcelona, the industrial network of the Graphic Arts of the clandestine CNT (an underground union) although in fact he was working as a waiter.

In April 1946, Facerias was nominated for the post of Defence Secretary of the Regional Committee of Catalonia and the Balearics of the Federation of Libertarian Youth of Iberia (FIJL).

On 17 August 1946 Facerias was arrested with almost all of the members of the Regional Committee along with other CNT activists: a total of 39 anarchists ended up in jail. He came out of prison in July 1947.

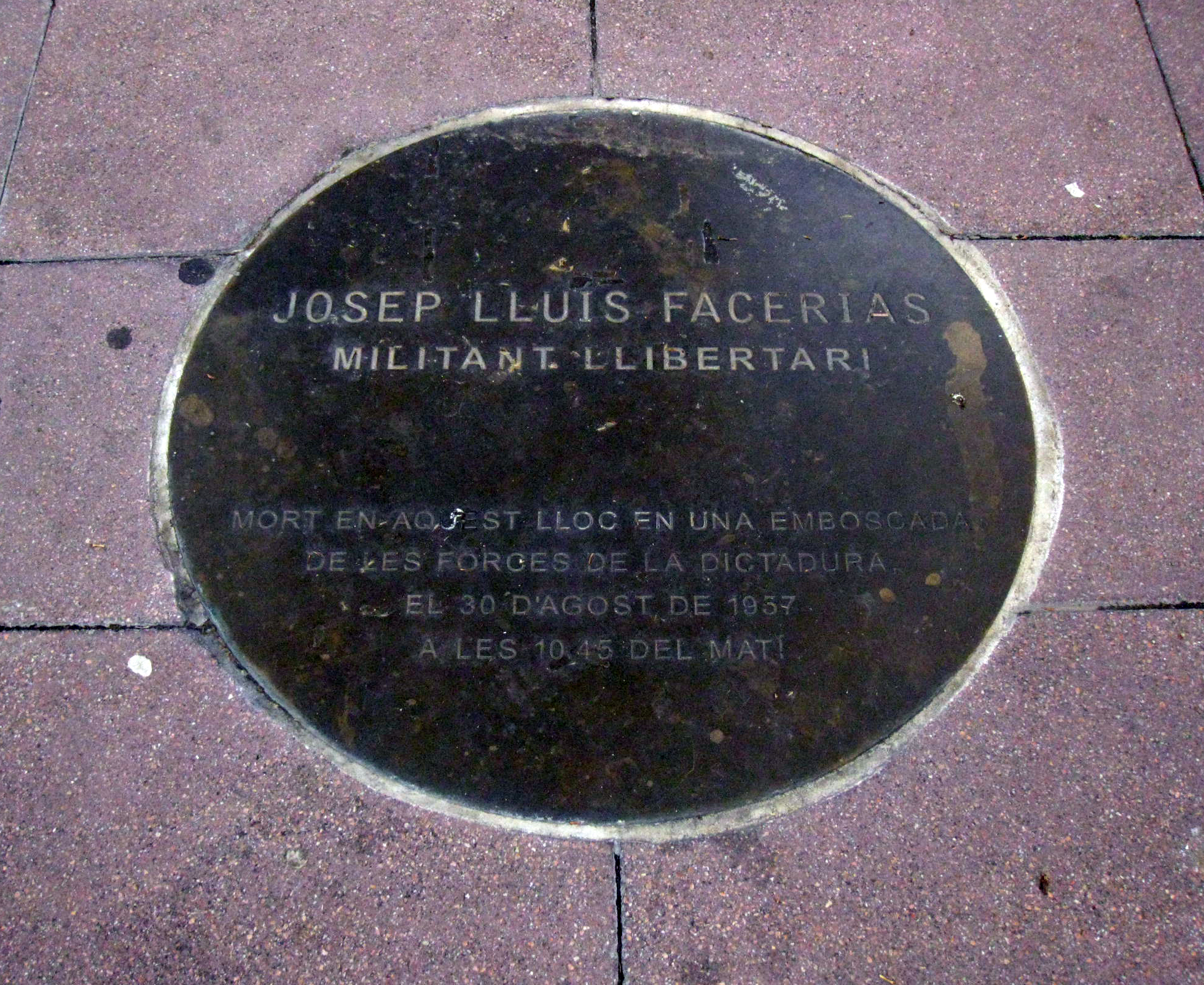
commemorative plate, Plaza de Mayo

Meanwhile, the Libertarian Resistance Movement (MLR) had been created which was intended to be the armed wing of Spanish anarcho-syndicalism. Facerias joined this organisation, but it had only an ephemeral life and was dissolved in February 1948. "Face" continued the violent opposition against Francoism until his death. On Friday 30 August 1957, at 10:45 AM, "Face" had a rendezvous in the Saint Andreu district, but those he was to meet had been arrested by the authorities, and the police were waiting for him. Facerias was shot several times, threw himself over a barrier into a trench, falling twelve feet. He then produced a hand-grenade from his pocket, but was fatally shot before it was primed, and died, aged 37. He was buried in the Montjuïc Cemetery, Barcelona.

== See also ==
- Anarchism in Spain

== Sources ==
- Téllez, Antonio, The Anarchist Resistance to Franco published by the Kate Sharpley Library.
- Tellez, Antonio. Sabate: Guerilla Extraordinary, Oakland:AK Press, 1998, ISBN 1-902593-10-3.
