= Sabaté brothers =

Spanish vigilante maquis

The Sabaté brothers Quico and Pepe (Francesc Sabaté i Llopart, and Josep Sabaté i Llopart) were among the famed Catalan Spanish maquis and urban guerrillas of the Francoist post-Civil War period. They participated in an anarchist guerrilla vigilante group of expropriators before the war. Afterward, as maquis, they turned their focus from unlikely anarchist mass insurrection to converting others to anti-Francoism.

The maquis descended from exile in the French Pyrenees to the Barcelona area, attacking Francoists and continuing vigilante robberies as a form of propaganda by deed. Their youngest brother, Manolo (Manuel Sabaté i Llopart), rode with another maquis in defiance of his brothers' request that he pursue other work. Manolo was quickly caught in a police trap and executed by firing squad in 1949 at Barcelona's El Camp de la Bóta, the notorious execution grounds of the Franco period.

== Los Novatos ==
The Sabaté brothers, Quico, Pepe and Manolo, were raised in L'Hospitalet de Llobregat, a Barcelona suburb at a time when anarchist organizations played more regular and practical roles in day-to-day living than government. Their father was a policeman, but had retired by the time they had become famed expropriators. Many future maquis were raised in these Barcelona industrial suburbs of the 1920s and 1930s and were steeped in the anarchist tradition indigenous to Barcelona. During those two decades, expropriators banded together in action/affinity groups in a time of pistolerisme ("gun law"), in which armed anarchist, urban guerrillas committed small-scale violence against the bourgeoisie with vigilante justice against their enemies. Brothers Quico and Pepe participated in a group called Los Novatos, or "The Rookies". During a 1933 anarchist uprising, they downed L'Hospitalet's power supply. Unlike the expropriators, however, who sought to incite insurrection toward the anarchist revolution, the guerrillas known as the maquis, as a result of the Spanish Civil War, sought the fall of Franco first, as anarchist revolution became a remote possibility. For this group, "propaganda of the deed" meant converting others to anti-Francoism, not anarchist insurrection.

During the Spanish Civil War, Quico Sabaté was known to even protect members of the bourgeoisie, as long as they did not support fascism, and hid some such people in his house to protect them from radical Republicans. Quico had evolved to this position, having seen what his anti-fascist but non-anarchist fellow Republicans sacrificed during the war. Quico and Pepe joined a local Republican defense group that served on the Aragon front. Through 1949, the decade after the war, Republican guerrillas maquis lived in exile in the French Pyrenees and would regularly return to Spain to expropriate money and assassinate Francoist loyalists. The maquis of Barcelona treated their social role with some theatricality and were known to have a level of friendliness and respect even while robbing people in their hometown. Their work was as much for personal gain as it was propaganda to share their message among their local comrades, who continued to support them. After one robbery, the Sabaté group left a note indicating that they are "anarchist resisters" and not "robbers" and would redistribute the food to children of killed anti-fascists and continue fighting for freedom. The Sabaté brothers Quico and Pepe were among the most famed maquis and Quico himself, legendary.

== Quico ==
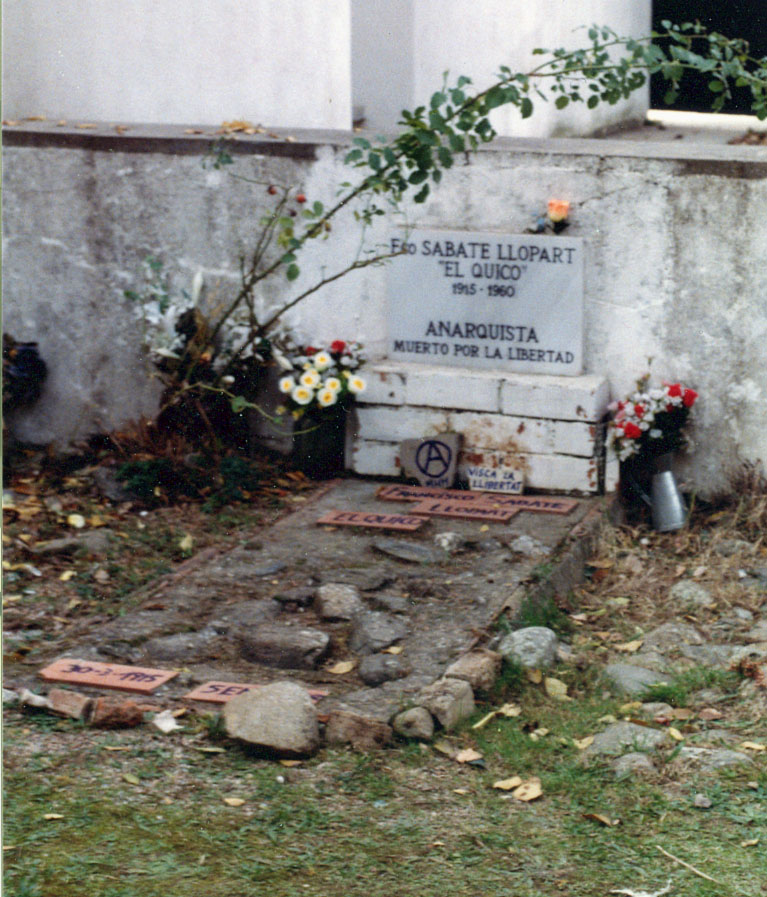
Quico's tomb

Francesc Sabaté i Llopart or Francisco Sabaté y Llopart, better known as Quico Sabaté or simply "El Quico", was a propagandist who would engage in risky public displays, such as during robberies, to reaffirm both the importance of resisting the Franco regime and Sabaté's own example of resisting their order. During his clandestine sojourns into Catalonia, Spain, Sabaté was known to make personal effort, at considerable risk, to visit and maintain friendships with his former neighbors of L'Hospitalet. These acts were partly to maintain his reputation as a member of the community, despite being an exile and fugitive.

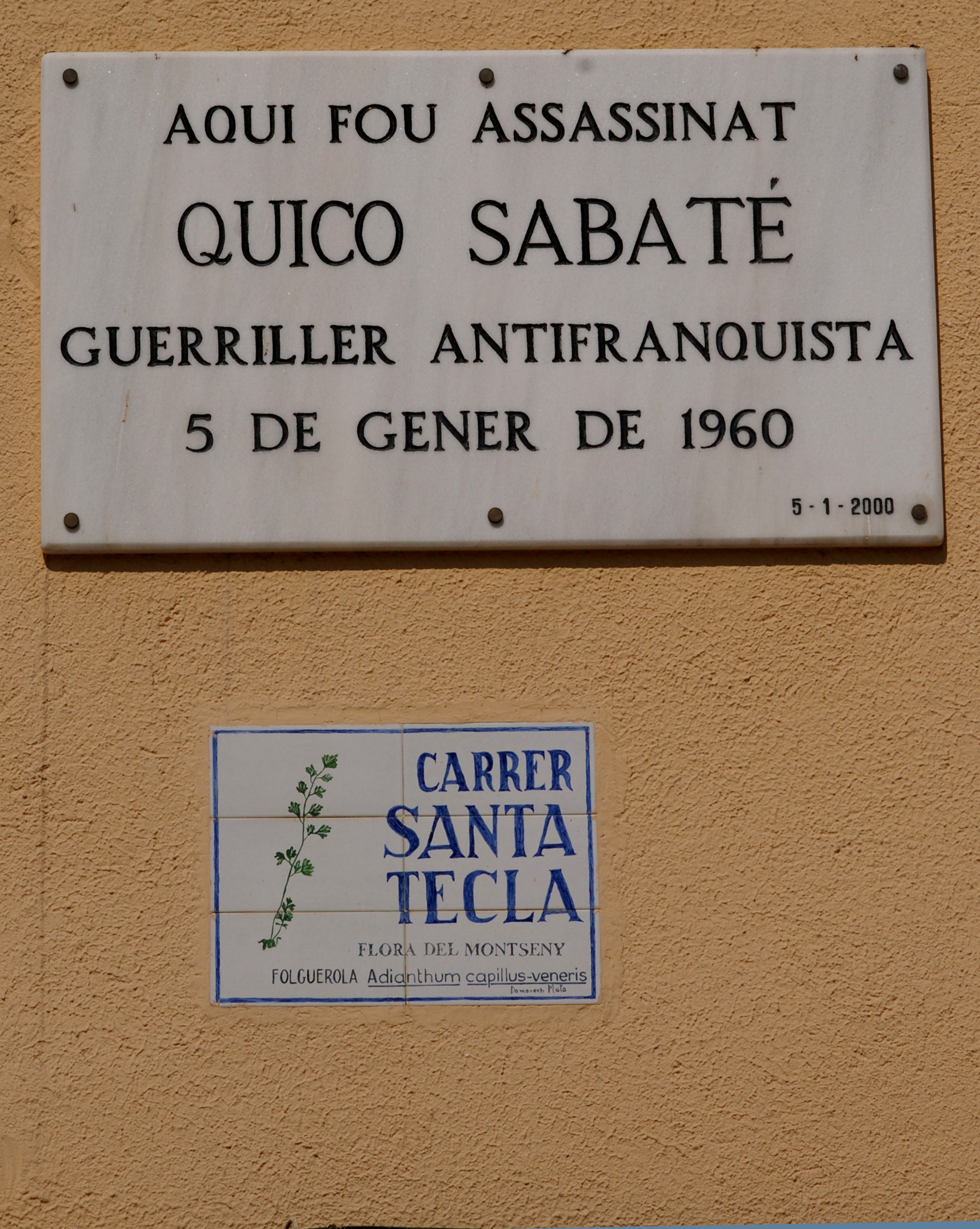
Placard marking the place of death of Quico Sabaté in L'Hospitalet de Llobregat, Catalonia, Spain

Quico's reputation traces to October 1945, when he freed three anarchist prisoners under police escort. He would ride across the Spanish–French border, staying briefly in Spain and escaping into the French mountains. In March 1949, he attempted to assassinate the police commissioner Eduardo Quintela. His attack on the wrong car killed its occupants. Upon his return to France, Quico was jailed through 1955. In late 1959, he returned to Spain for the last time. In January 1960, he and his group were surrounded in a Girona farmhouse. Quico escaped, wounded, and commandeered a train. After seeking medical treatment for his now gangrenous wound, Quico was spotted and killed on January 5.

His death inspired the 1961 novel Killing a Mouse on Sunday, which was adapted into the 1964 film Behold a Pale Horse.

== Pepe ==
Josep Sabaté i Llopart, i.e. Pep or Pepe Sabaté, was sighted while exiting a tram in Barcelona's Plaça Urquinaona in late 1949. Thinking that he might be followed, he drew his pistol and, when accosted by two police officers, shot and killed one. The other shot Pepe, who resisted but would ultimately bleed out due to his wounds in Carrer de Sant Pere Més Baix, a street in the Sant Pere neighborhood of Barcelona's Old City. His wife and son continued to live in French exile.

== Manuel ==
Quico and Pepe's younger brother, Manolo (Manuel Sabaté i Llopart), was less political in comparison to his brothers. He pursued his dream of becoming a matador, spending his late teens in Andalucia, but later abandoned this pursuit and traveled to Eus in the Pyrenees mountains to join his brothers as a maquis. Quico and Pepe suggested that Manuel stay, study, and work in France instead. They doubted his devotion to the cause and did not want Manuel along on their sojourns into Spain. Manuel defied them and convinced Ramon Vila Capdevila and an Italian anarchist to let him ride alongside in 1949. They met up with another group but split off near Barcelona toward Vila's area, Berga. Awaiting them was a police trap from which Vila escaped and Manuel was caught. It was Manuel's first arrest but his association as one of the Sabaté guaranteed a death sentence.

In prison, Manuel continued his propaganda by deed with reckless bravery and little effect, having no audience. He botched an escape attempt by irreparably destroying his toilet while looking for surfaces to dig out with a spoon. He was punished and later executed.

== See also ==
- Lucio Urtubia
- Bonnot Gang
- Illegalism

== Bibliography ==
- Beevor, Antony (2007) [2006]. The Battle for Spain: The Spanish Civil War 1936–1939. London: Phoenix. ISBN 978-0-7538-2165-7. OCLC 845175717.
- Hayes, Marcella (2015). "The Rebel Gesture: Anarchist Maquis of Barcelona, 1939–1960". The Spanish Civil War and Its Memory. Barcelona: University of Barcelona. pp. 63–127. ISBN 978-84-475-3927-7.
- Sheehan, Seán (2004). Anarchism. Reaktion Books. pp. 97–98. ISBN 978-1-86189-507-3.
