= William MacQueen =

British anarchist (1875–1908)

Billy MacQueen
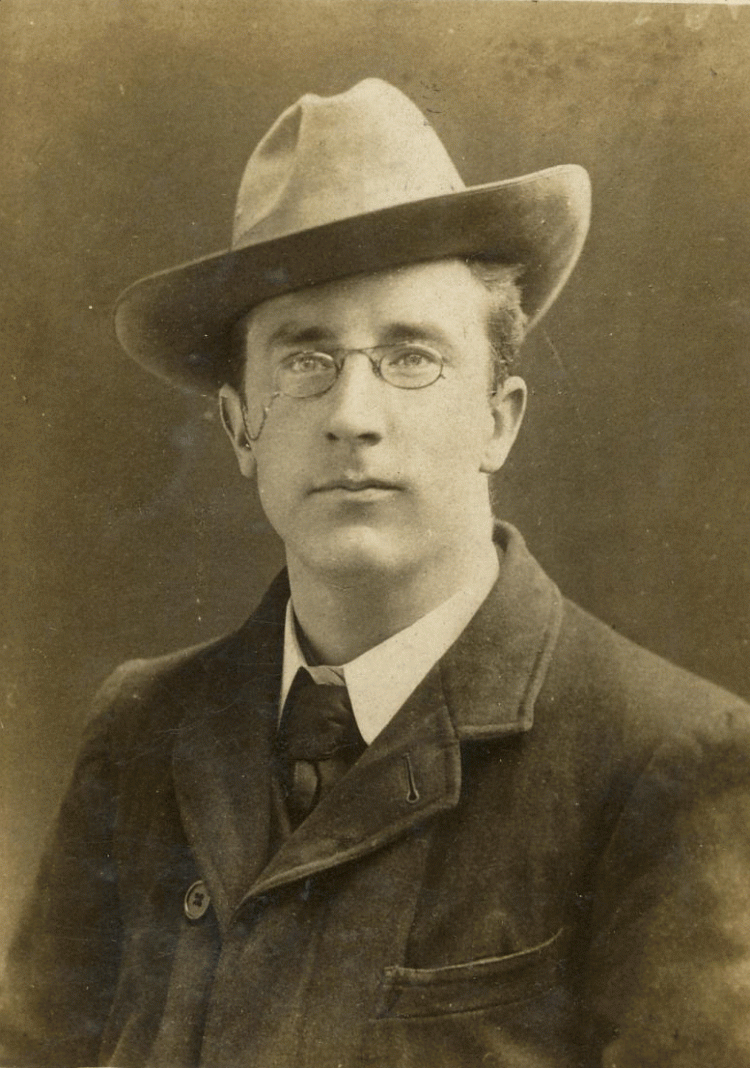
- Born: William MacQueen; 14 January 1875; Fitzrovia, London, England
- Died: 9 November 1908 (aged 33); Hunstlet, Leeds, England
- Movement: Anarchism
- Spouse: Nellie Barton (m. 1895)

William MacQueen (14 January 1875 – 9 November 1908) was a British anarchist, trade unionist, newspaper editor and public speaker.

== Biography ==
MacQueen was born on 14 January 1875 in London, England. His father, Robert MacQueen, was a painter. William MacQueen began working as a painter, later working as a commercial traveller.

In 1895 MacQueen married Nellie Barton in 1895, the sister of his friend and fellow anarchist Alf Barton.

From 1898 to 1899 he edited the Leeds-based monthly anarchist paper The Free Commune. MacQueen was a fluent German speaker and in 1901 translated the book Communist Anarchism by Johann Most.

MacQueen emigrated to New York City, began working as a proofreader, and from 1902 to 1903 edited the anarchist paper Liberty. He was an agitator and public speaker during the 1902 Paterson silk strike, where he was arrested alongside Rudolf Grossmann and Luigi Galleani for inciting a riot. MacQueen fled on bail to the United Kingdom, but later returned to face trial, was sentenced to five years and fined $1500. While in prison he was interviewed by H. G. Wells. MacQueen was released after three years on the condition that he leave the United States and didn't return.

MacQueen contracted tuberculosis in prison and died in Leeds on the 9 November 1908 aged 33. He was survived by his wife and children.

== See also ==
- Anarchism in the United Kingdom
