= Candace Falk =

American historian (born 1947)

- Born: July 30, 1947 (age 79); New York City, U.S.
- Occupation: Historian
- Spouse: Lowell Finley (m. 1977)
- Children: 2
- Awards: Guggenheim Fellowship (1998)

Academic background
- Education: University of Chicago; University of California, Santa Cruz

Academic work
- Discipline: History
- Sub-discipline: Emma Goldman
- Institutions: Stockton State College; University of California, Berkeley
- Notable works: Love, Anarchy, and Emma Goldman; Emma Goldman: A Documentary History of the American Years

Candace Falk (born July 30, 1947) is an American historian. A 1998 Guggenheim Fellow, she is the founder of the University of California, Berkeley's Emma Goldman Papers Project, and she is author of Love, Anarchy, and Emma Goldman (1984) and editor of Emma Goldman: A Documentary History of the American Years.

== Biography ==
Candace Falk was born on July 30, 1947 in New York City to Mildred (née Rosen) and Nathaniel Falk. She worked as a research associate at Woodlawn Mental Health Center, while studying at the University of Chicago, where she got a BA in 1969 and an MA in 1971. After working as a teacher at Stockton State College (1971-1972) and as an editor at the Center for Social Research and Education in San Francisco (1972-1979) and the Southeast Asia Resource Center (1976-1979), she moved to the University of California, Berkeley, in 1980. She obtained her PhD from the University of California, Santa Cruz, in 1984.

Falk specializes in anarchist Emma Goldman, having gained interest through her own interest in the anti-war movement and feminism. She founded UCB's Emma Goldman Papers Project the same year she joined the university. In 1984, she wrote Love, Anarchy, and Emma Goldman, a biography based on letters from Goldman's ten-year love affair with Ben Reitman. She is the documentary editor of Emma Goldman: A Documentary History of the American Years, a multi-volume collection of original documents pertaining to Goldman's time spent in the United States, as well as Emma Goldman: A Guide to Her Life and Documentary Sources (1995). She wrote the preface for a 1982 edition of Goldman's autobiography Living My Life. Her other collaborations include a secondary school curriculum on Goldman and a microfilm edition on Goldman's papers.

In 1998, Falk was awarded a Guggenheim Fellowship to write essays on Emma Goldman. Her Emma Goldman Papers Project won the Society of American Archivists' 2014 Philip M. Hamer and Elizabeth Hamer Kegan Award. She is an Organization of American Historians Distinguished Lecturer.

On October 23, 1977, Falk married lawyer Lowell Finley; they have two children. Falk lives in Berkeley, California.

== Bibliography ==
- Love, Anarchy, and Emma Goldman (1984)
- Emma Goldman: A Guide to Her Life and Documentary Sources (1995)
- Emma Goldman: A Documentary History of the American Years
