= 1902 Paterson silk dyers strike =

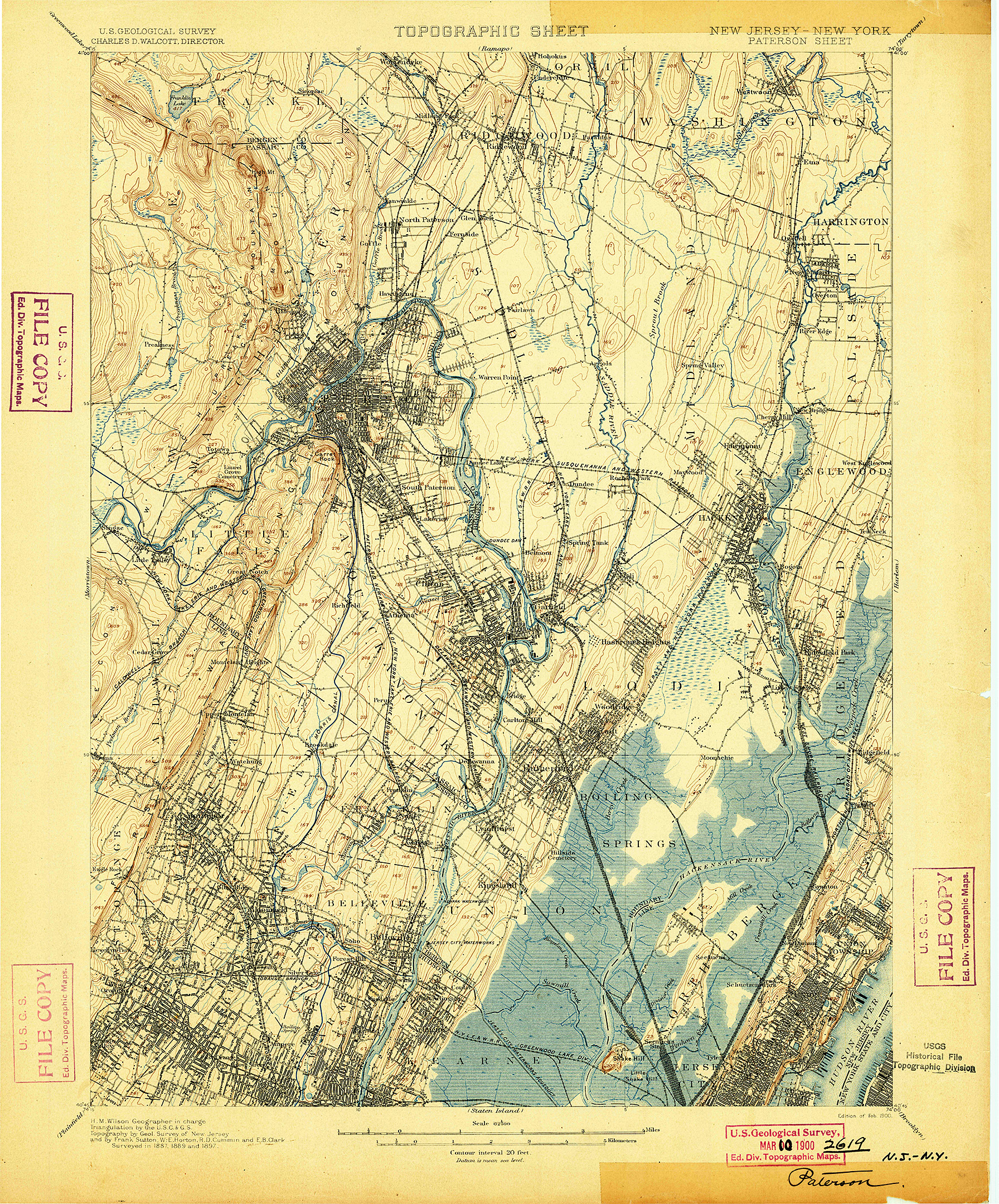
Map of Paterson, New Jersey c. 1900

A strike of silk dyers in Paterson, New Jersey, from April to June 1902, spilled over into the wider New Jersey textile industry.

== Background ==
At the turn of the 20th century, Italians were the predominant immigrant nationality in Paterson's silk industry. The silk dyers' helpers, an unskilled trade, were mainly from southern Italy and formed the center of Paterson's Italian community. The silk dyers' militant tradition extended from the radical political tradition of immigrants from northern Italy. In the 1890s, Paterson was known as the international home of Italian anarchism. The Paterson Italian community was willing to defend itself against anti-Italian prejudices of the public and police, even if it meant resorting to violence. The community banded together through their conflicts with management and police. Weavers had far more strikes than dye workers in the 1890s. As management could more easily replace and break the strike of unskilled dye workers, dye worker strikes tended to be bigger, such as the property destruction at the hands of dye workers in the 1894 ribbon weavers' strike.

== History ==
On April 23, 1902, a walkout of silk dyers in Paterson, New Jersey, started a strike. The strike targeted Paterson's two biggest dye firms, Jacob Weidmann and the National Silk Dyeing Company, both of whom opposed collective bargaining. What began with twenty workers from two firms spread to gunshot injuries to three Italian workers and one policeman at one plant. Smaller firms settled with the strikers. While the silk dyers supported each other, other silk industry workers did not support the strike and the industry's subcontracting to Pennsylvania factories mitigated its impact. The local newspaper Paterson Guardian supported the employers.

Though the strike was waning by June, thousands of workers attended a rally on June 18 in Belmont Park, in Haledon, New Jersey, with speakers including Luigi Galleani, William MacQueen, and Rudolf Grossmann. The rally dissipated into riots in the Paterson mill district. In the police gunfire, Galleani was shot in the face and absconded to Canada. Paterson declared martial law and brought in the National Guard, ending both the riots and the strike.

== Legacy ==
The strike was the Paterson's bloodiest.

== Bibliography ==
- Falk, Candace, ed. (2004). Emma Goldman: A Documentary History of the American Years, Vol. 2: Making Speech Free, 1902–1909. Berkeley: University of California Press. ISBN 978-0-520-22569-5.
- Golin, Steve (1988). The Fragile Bridge: Paterson Silk Strike, 1913. Philadelphia: Temple University Press. ISBN 978-0-87722-534-8.
- Goyens, Tom (2007). Beer and Revolution: the German Anarchist Movement in New York City, 1880–1914. Urbana: University of Illinois Press. ISBN 978-0-252-03175-5.
