= Love, Anarchy, and Emma Goldman =

1984 biography by Candace Falk

- Author: Candace Falk
- Subject: Biography
- Publisher: Holt, Rinehart & Winston
- Publication date: 1984
- Pages: 603

Love, Anarchy, and Emma Goldman: A Biography is a 1984 biography of Emma Goldman by Candace Falk. It is based on letters from Goldman's ten-year love affair with Ben Reitman.

External audio
- The author on discovering Goldman's love letters and the subsequent biography, 2015

== Bibliography ==
- Acena, Albert (1986). "Review of Love, Anarchy, and Emma Goldman". The History Teacher. 20 (1): 135–136. doi:10.2307/493200. ISSN 0018-2745. JSTOR 493200.
- Buhle, Mari Jo (January 23, 1985). "Emma Goldman: The Private Side of Living Her Life". In These Times. pp. 18–19.
- Frazer, Winifred L. (1984). "Review of Love, Anarchy, and Emma Goldman; Emma Goldman: An Intimate Life". Resources for American Literary Study. 14 (1/2): 198–206. doi:10.2307/26366428. ISSN 0048-7384. JSTOR 26366428.
- Herzog, Don. "Reviews of Love, Anarchy, and Emma Goldman: A Biography; Emma Goldman: An Intimate Life". The American Spectator. pp. 37–38.
- Marsh, Margaret (1985). "Review of Love, Anarchy, and Emma Goldman". The Pennsylvania Magazine of History and Biography. 109 (3): 412–413. ISSN 0031-4587. JSTOR 20091949.
- Marten, Suzanne (1985). "Review of Love, Anarchy, and Emma Goldman: A Biography". The Wisconsin Magazine of History. 69 (2): 156–157. ISSN 0043-6534. JSTOR 4635964.
- Myers, Constance Ashton (1986). "Review of Love, Anarchy, and Emma Goldman; Emma Goldman: An Intimate Life". The American Historical Review. 91 (3): 754–755. doi:10.2307/1869316. ISSN 0002-8762. JSTOR 1869316.
- Rosenberg, Karen (1984). "Emma's Ambiguous Legacy". The Women's Review of Books. 2 (2): 8–9. doi:10.2307/4019469. ISSN 0738-1433. JSTOR 4019469.
- Sochen, June (1985). "Review of Love, Anarchy, and Emma Goldman; Emma Goldman: An Intimate Life". American Jewish History. 75 (1): 107–109. ISSN 0164-0178. JSTOR 23882674.
- Sternhell, Carol (November 24, 1984). "Human, All Too Human". The Nation. pp. 557–558.
