= Emma Goldman: The Anarchist Guest =

- Directed by: Coleman Romalis
- Release date: 2000
- Country: Canada

Emma Goldman: The Anarchist Guest is a Canadian documentary film about Emma Goldman that was released in 2000. It was directed by Canadian sociologist and filmmaker Coleman Romalis. The film was screened at the 2000 San Francisco Jewish Film Festival.
