= No Conscription League =

American anarchist organization (1917)

No Conscription League Manifesto
- Excerpt of the No Conscription League Manifesto
- Author: Emma Goldman and Alexander Berkman
- Language: English
- Publication date: 1917
- Publication place: Manhattan, New York, U.S.

The No Conscription League was an anarchist organisation designed to promote anti-draft manifestos and aid those who refused military service. The league lasted for six weeks and was used to charge its founders Emma Goldman and Alexander Berkman with conspiracy to obstruct the draft.

== Formation ==
The No Conscription League in the United States was founded by anarchist Emma Goldman and Alexander Berkman in 1917 in response to the draft in World War I. The draft was enforced by the Selective Service Act of 1917, which granted the federal government the right to raise a national army. The league viewed the draft as a destroyer of the freedom to ethical and political choice granted by the constitution of the United States. The members of the league strongly opposed government-enforced conscription; they saw it as a violation of the liberty of American people. This oppression was justified by Woodrow Wilson's Espionage Act of 1917, which prohibited any action that would interfere with the US military or government affairs. Many were prosecuted under this act, including those in the No Conscription League. Those charged were fined a maximum of 10,000 dollars and were sentenced to up to 20 years of imprisonment.

== Manifesto ==
Emma Goldman and the members of her league published a piece of literature known as the No Conscription League manifesto. This document goes into great detail about the freedoms of Americans, and how the government was oppressing citizens' certain unalienable rights. Goldman urges the nation for support and promotes the need to protect and fight for one's liberty as a citizen. This pamphlet went into circulation with over 100,000 printed, which caused fear in the eyes of the US government. The following is the platform on which the league was founded, taken from the manifesto itself:

We oppose conscription because we are internationalists, anti-militarists, and opposed to all wars waged by capitalistic governments.

We will fight for what we choose to fight for; we will never fight simply because we are ordered to fight. We believe that the militarization of America is an evil that far outweighs, in its anti-social and anti-libertarian effects, any good that may come from America's participation in the war.

We will resist conscription by every means in our power, and we will sustain those who, for similar reasons, refuse to be conscripted.

== Government response ==
Due to the mass number of publications of the manifesto, the government retaliated against people who were in opposition to the draft. Anti-draft meetings were forbidden, and those speaking out against the draft were to be arrested. In response to the 4 June 1917 mass meeting, Emma Goldman and Alexander Berkman were arrested with bail set at $25,000 each. According to the PBS time line on Emma Goldman regarding her arrest, "Berkman and Goldman were found guilty of conspiracy against the selective draft law in New York City. They were fined $10,000, sentenced to two years' imprisonment, and immediately transported to federal penitentiaries: Berkman was sent to Atlanta State Penitentiary in Georgia and Goldman was taken to Jefferson City Penitentiary in Missouri".

== See also ==
- Conscription crisis
- Opposition to World War I
- List of anti-war organizations
