= Emma (play) =

Emma (or Emma: A Play in Two Acts about Emma Goldman, American Anarchist, its full title) is a play by historian and playwright Howard Zinn (1922–2010). It was first performed in 1976 at Theater for the New City directed by Jeff Zinn.

== Context ==
The play dramatizes events from the life of Emma Goldman. Zinn wrote the play using Goldman's autobiography, correspondence between Goldman and fellow anarchist Alexander Berkman (Emma's lover, who also became a character in the play), and other research. As Zinn describes her in his introduction, "She seemed to be tireless as she traveled the country, lecturing to large audiences everywhere, on birth control ('A woman should decide for herself'), on the problems of marriage as an institution ('Marriage has nothing to do with love'), on patriotism ('the last refuge of a scoundrel'), on free love ('What is love if not free?'), and also on the drama — Shaw, Ibsen, Strindberg."

According to author Tom H. Hastings, the play shows the period of Goldman's "nonviolence and resistance to militarism", rather than her earlier "attachment to violent revolution". After someone accuses her of plotting to "blow up the fleet" in San Francisco harbor, she declares "Bombs are not my way", but she "would be happy to see the fleet sink to the bottom of the sea ... so that we, and our brothers and sisters in other countries, can live in peace."

== Plot summary ==
The action of the play takes place during the late 1880s, and focuses on the character of Emma Goldman as she grows from a simple textile factory worker to a revolutionary and anarchist. The outspoken advocacy of radical anarchist and populist ideals are followed through persecution and hardship to the beginnings of World War I. The play closes with the words of Goldman during an anti-conscription protest in 1917, just before her arrest on sedition charges.
