= James Colton =

Scottish anarchist (1860–1936)

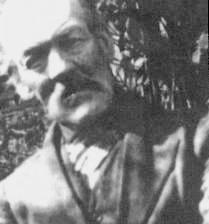
- Colton, c. 1925
- Born: 12 May 1860; Govan, Scotland
- Died: 5 August 1936 (aged 76); Glanamman, Wales
- Occupations: Anarchist; trade unionist; coal miner
- Known for: Marriage of convenience with Emma Goldman
- Spouse: Emma Goldman (m. 1925)

Signature
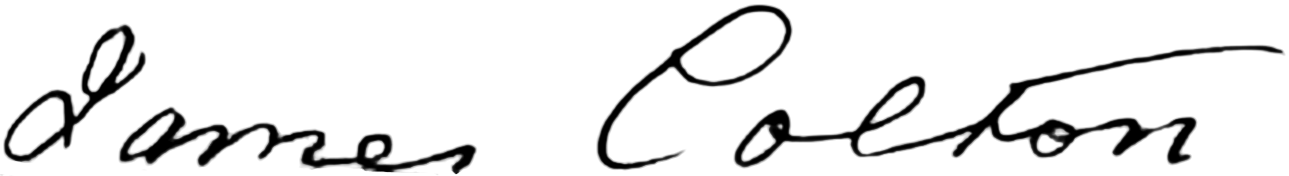

James Colton (12 May 1860 – 5 August 1936) was a Scottish anarchist, trade unionist, and coal miner who spent most of his life in Wales. He worked as a baker before becoming a miner in Glanamman in the Amman Valley. He is known for marrying the anarchist activist and writer Emma Goldman on 27 June 1925 in a marriage of convenience that enabled her to obtain British citizenship.

== Biography ==
=== Early life and work ===
Colton was born in Govan, Scotland, on 12 May 1860, the son of Arthur Colton, a stonemason, and Ann Colton (née Mechan). He moved to Penarth in Wales as a child.

He worked first as a baker in Upper Boat and later moved to Glanamman in the Amman Valley, where he became a miner at the Gelliceidrim Colliery. Colton was self-educated and identified with libertarian thought.

He first met Emma Goldman during her speaking tour of Edinburgh in 1895.

=== Marriage to Emma Goldman ===
After the death of Colton's first wife, and as Goldman sought British citizenship following her deportation from the United States in 1919, Colton proposed a marriage of convenience. They married on 27 June 1925, Goldman's 58th birthday, when he was 65. The couple were not close and did not intend to live together. Despite this, they occasionally maintained contact via letters. The marriage was reported in The New York Times the following year.

=== Later years and death ===
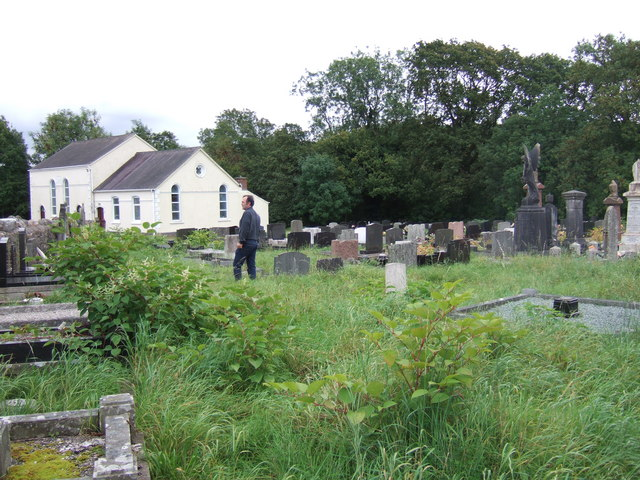
Tabernacle chapel and cemetery, Glanamman, where Colton is buried

After the death of Goldman's longtime partner Alexander Berkman, Colton, who was ill himself, wrote to Goldman to express his sympathies.

Colton died of cancer on 5 August 1936. He was buried in the Tabernacle cemetery at Glanamman. Goldman's last letter to Colton did not reach him before his death.
