= Emma Goldman: A Documentary History of the American Years =

- Volume 1: Made for America, 1890–1901; Volume 2: Making Speech Free, 1902–1909; Volume 3: Light and Shadows, 1910–1916
- Edited by: Candace Falk

Emma Goldman: A Documentary History of the American Years is a collection of original documents pertaining to anarchist Emma Goldman's time spent in the United States. Prepared by Candace Falk, founding director of the Emma Goldman Research Project at the University of California, Berkeley, the documents cover Goldman's career from her 1890 arrival in the United States through her 1919 deportation to Russia.
