= The Social Significance of the Modern Drama =

Book by Emma Goldman

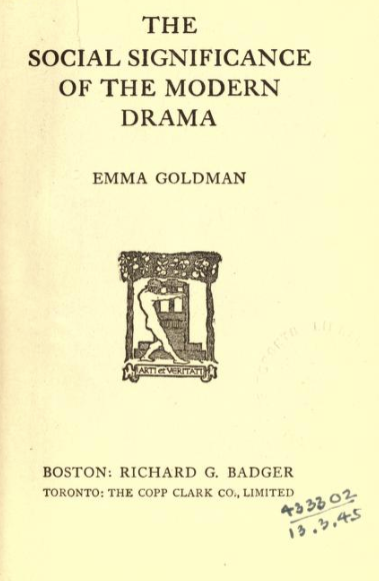
- Title page for The Social Significance of the Modern Drama (1914)
- Author: Emma Goldman
- Language: English
- Genre: Non-fiction
- Publication date: 1914

The Social Significance of the Modern Drama is a 1914 treatise by Emma Goldman on political implications of significant playwrights in the late nineteenth and early twentieth centuries.

Goldman, who had done significant work with Modernist dramatists (managing tours, hosting, publicizing, and lecturing), here published her analyses of the political implications of modern drama. The book featured analyses of the political—even radical—implications of the work of playwrights including Henrik Ibsen, August Strindberg, Hermann Sudermann, Gerhart Hauptmann, Frank Wedekind, Maurice Maeterlinck, Edmond Rostand, Brieux, George Bernard Shaw, John Galsworthy, Stanley Houghton, Githa Sowerby, William Butler Yeats, Lennox Robinson, T. G.(C) Murray, Leo Tolstoy, Anton Tchekhof (more familiar in English as "Anton Chekhov"), Maxim Gorky, and Leonid Andreyev. Goldman published the book as she set out on a tour, hoping to acquaint radicals and ordinary citizens alike to the radical potential of modern drama.

The book was first published in 1914, Richard G. Badger, The Gorham Press, in Boston, and in Toronto, the Copp Clark Co., Ltd. The book was not a commercial success, and was quickly out of print.

== See also ==
- Anarchism and the arts
- Expressionism (theatre)
