= Pierre Ramus =

Austrian anarchist (1882–1942)

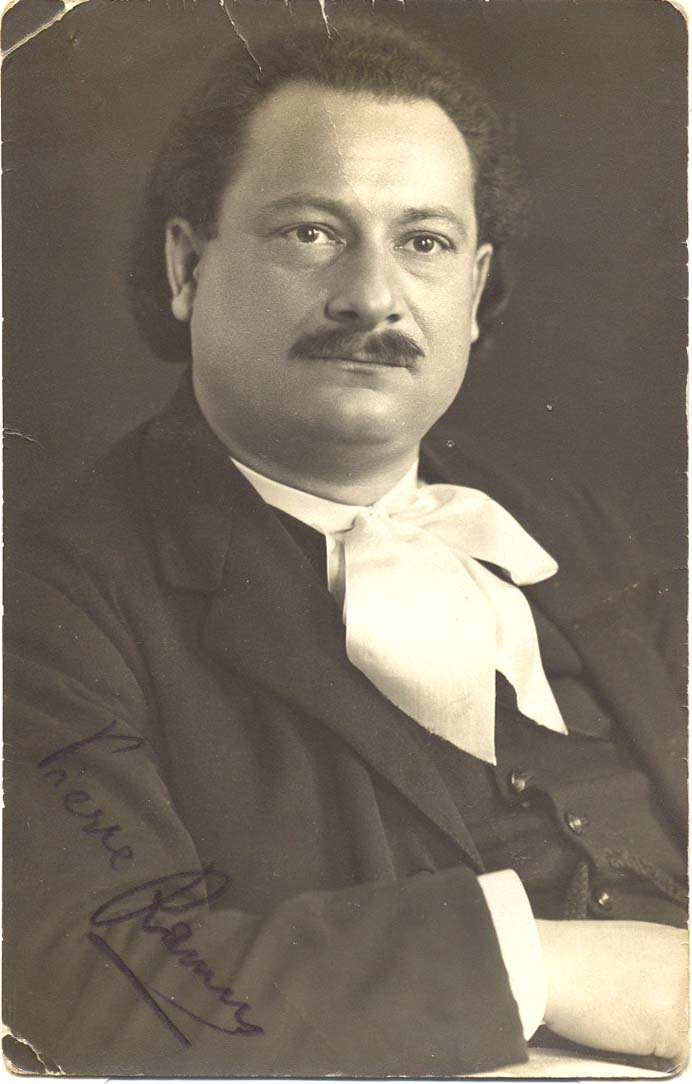
- Ramus in 1924
- Born: April 15, 1882; Vienna
- Died: May 27, 1942 (aged 60)
- Occupations: Journalist, writer
- Spouse: Sophie Ossipowna Friedmann

Rudolf Grossmann (1882–1942), known by his pseudonym Pierre Ramus, was an Austrian anarchist and pacifist.

== Early life and career ==
Rudolf Grossmann was born April 15, 1882, in Vienna. His father was a Jewish merchant and his mother was Catholic. Grossmann's participation in Social-Democratic propaganda led him to cut off relations with his parents and schooling. He was sent to New York family in 1895 where he soon joined the socialist movement. As a late teen, Grossmann worked with the New Yorker Volkszeitung and Gross-New-Yorker Zeitung. He wrote on antimilitarism, anarcho-syndicalism, and communist anarchism, influenced by Peter Kropotkin and Leo Tolstoy. He met Johann Most and published in his Freiheit.

With friends, he published the short-lived anarchist monthly Der Zeitgeist from April to July 1901. Its anticapitalist content sought to be a mix of "honest, unfanatical, and studious social-revolutionary elements" and declared the need for revolution by any means necessary, akin to romantic anarchist periodicals from the 1880s. The magazine also covered literature with topical book reviews. The first issue, on May Day 1901, included contributions from Most and Georg Biedenkapp. Biedenkapp's satirical supplement Der Tramp continued to publish through November. It was the era's last revolutionary German-language anarchist periodical in New York City.

The repression surrounding the late 1901 anarchist assassination of William McKinley likely affected Grossmann's propaganda. His planned Austrian-Hungarian newspaper did not materialize. Grossmann went to Paterson, New Jersey, to join in the 1902 silk dyers strike there, seeking to foment a general strike beyond the silk dyers' conditions alone. He spoke to crowds of workers in June but had left town by the time the workers rioted in the apex of the strike. Grossmann was arrested along with other speakers for inciting to riot. New York anarchists had started a legal defense fund by the time he was released on bail in August.

Grossmann was convicted in October and sentenced to five years of hard labor. His appeal to the New Jersey Supreme Court was denied despite multiple witnesses confirming that he had not been in Paterson. Grossmann absconded to England by way of Canada and adopted multiple pseudonyms: Pierre Ramus, Friedrich Stürmer, and Klarent Morleit. He moved between London, Berlin, and Vienna, and received a doctorate in economics (1910). In Austria, he spent time as an editor, antimilitary activist, and sex reformer. In 1938, he left for Switzerland, France, and Morocco. Boarding a ship to Veracruz, Mexico, en route to the United States to reunite with his family, Grossmann died after a week at sea in May 1942.

== Bibliography ==
- Goyens, Tom (2007). Beer and Revolution: the German Anarchist Movement in New York City, 1880–1914. Urbana: University of Illinois Press. ISBN 978-0-252-03175-5.
