= Emma Goldman =

Russian-born anarchist (1869–1940)

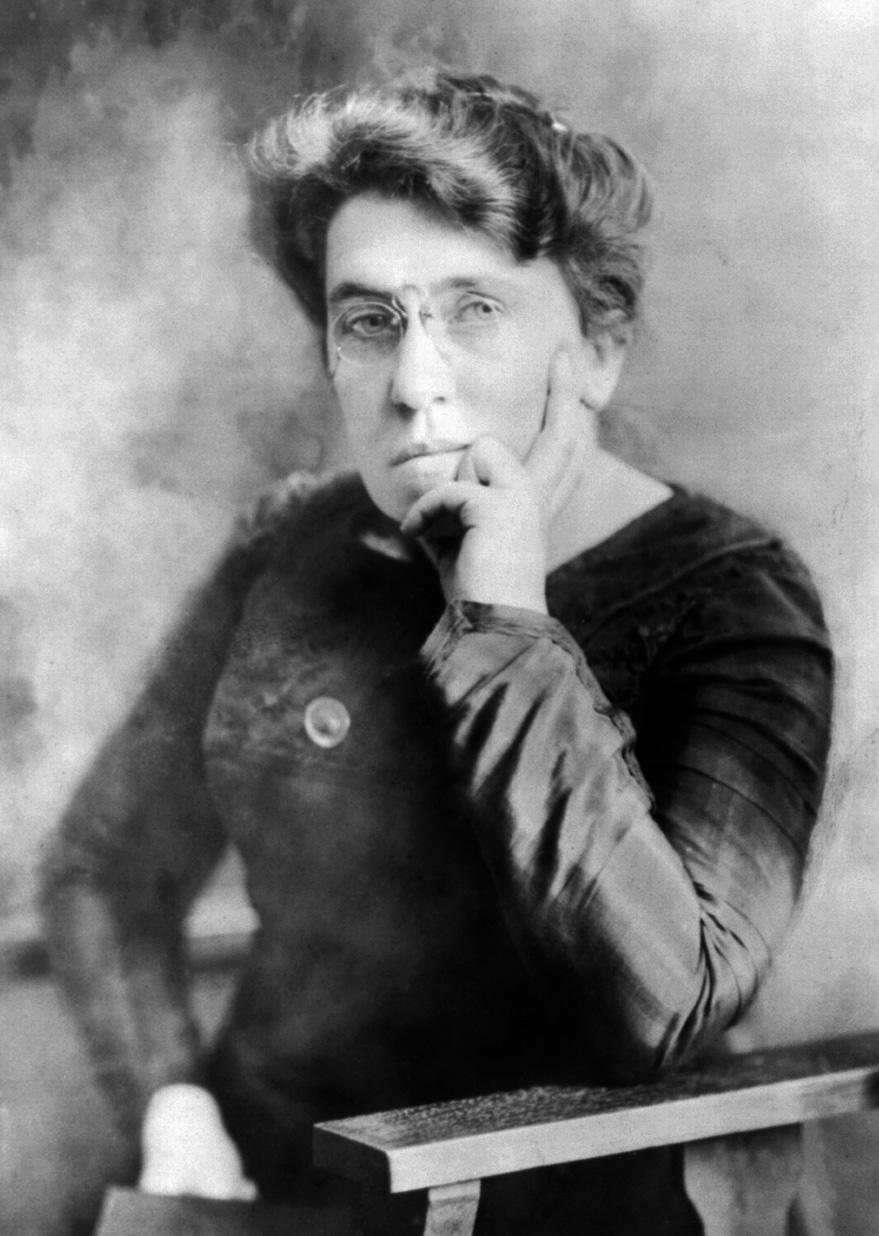
- Goldman, c. 1911
- Born: June 27, 1869; Kaunas, Kovno Governorate, Russian Empire
- Died: May 14, 1940 (aged 70); Toronto, Ontario, Canada
- Resting place: Forest Home Cemetery, Illinois, US
- Spouses: Jacob Kershner (m. 1887; div. 1888) James Colton (m. 1925; died 1936)

Philosophical work
- School: Anarchism; feminism
- Notable works: Anarchism and Other Essays (1910); Living My Life (1931); The Social Significance of the Modern Drama (1914)

Emma Goldman (June 27, 1869 – May 14, 1940) was a Russian-born anarchist revolutionary, political activist, and writer. She played a pivotal role in the development of anarchist political philosophy in North America and Europe in the first half of the 20th century.

Born in Kaunas, Lithuania (then within the Russian Empire), to a Lithuanian Jewish family, Goldman immigrated to the United States in 1885. Attracted to anarchism after the Haymarket affair in Chicago, Goldman became a writer and a renowned lecturer on anarchist philosophy, women's rights, and social issues, attracting crowds of thousands. She and anarchist writer Alexander Berkman, her lover and lifelong friend, planned to assassinate industrialist and financier Henry Clay Frick as an act of propaganda of the deed. Frick survived the attempt on his life in 1892, and Berkman was sentenced to 22 years in prison. Goldman was imprisoned several times in the years that followed, for "inciting to riot" and illegally distributing information about birth control. In 1906, Goldman founded the anarchist journal Mother Earth.

In 1917, Goldman and Berkman were sentenced to two years in jail for conspiring to "induce persons not to register" for the newly instated draft. After their release from prison, they were arrested—along with 248 others—in the so-called Palmer Raids during the First Red Scare and deported to Russia in December 1919. Initially supportive of that country's October Revolution that brought the Bolsheviks to power, Goldman changed her opinion in the wake of the Kronstadt rebellion; she denounced the Soviet Union for its violent repression of independent voices. She left the Soviet Union and in 1923 published a book about her experiences, My Disillusionment in Russia. While living in England, Canada, and France, she wrote an autobiography called Living My Life. It was published in two volumes, in 1931 and 1935. After the outbreak of the Spanish Civil War, Goldman traveled to Spain to support the anarchist revolution there. She died in Toronto, Ontario, Canada, in 1940, aged 70.

During her life, Goldman was lionized as a freethinking "rebel woman" by admirers, and denounced by detractors as an advocate of politically motivated murder and violent revolution. Her writing and lectures spanned a wide variety of issues, including prisons, atheism, freedom of speech, militarism, capitalism, marriage, free love, and homosexuality. Although she distanced herself from first-wave feminism and its efforts toward women's suffrage, she developed new ways of incorporating gender politics into anarchism. After decades of obscurity, Goldman gained iconic status in the 1970s by a revival of interest in her life, when feminist and anarchist scholars rekindled popular interest.

== Biography ==
=== Family ===
Emma Goldman was born into an Orthodox Jewish family in Kaunas in Lithuania, then within the Russian Empire. Goldman's mother Taube Bienowitch had been married before to a man with whom she had two daughters—Helena in 1860 and Lena in 1862. When her first husband died of tuberculosis, Taube was devastated. Goldman later wrote: "Whatever love she had had died with the young man to whom she had been married at the age of fifteen."

Taube's second marriage was arranged by her family and, as Goldman puts it, "mismated from the first". Her second husband, Abraham Goldman, invested Taube's inheritance in a business that quickly failed. The ensuing hardship, combined with the emotional distance between husband and wife, made the household a tense place for the children. When Taube became pregnant, Abraham hoped desperately for a son; a daughter, he believed, would be one more sign of failure. They eventually had three sons, but their first child was Emma.

Emma Goldman was born on June 27, 1869. Her father used violence to punish his children, beating them when they disobeyed him. He used a whip on Emma, the most rebellious of them. Her mother provided scarce comfort, rarely calling on Abraham to tone down his beatings. Goldman later speculated that her father's furious temper was at least partly a result of sexual frustration.

Goldman's relationships with her elder half-sisters, Helena and Lena, were a study in contrasts. Helena, the oldest, provided the comfort the children lacked from their mother and filled Goldman's childhood with "whatever joy it had". Lena, however, was distant and uncharitable. The three sisters were joined by brothers Louis (who died at the age of six), Herman (born in 1872), and Moishe (born in 1879).

=== Adolescence ===
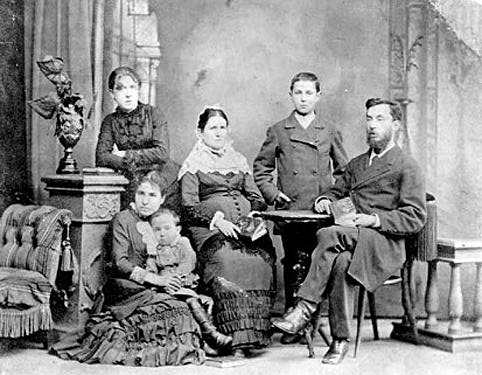
Emma Goldman's family in St. Petersburg, Russia in 1882. From left to right: Emma, standing; Helena, seated, with Moishe on her lap; Taube; Herman; Abraham.

When Emma Goldman was a young girl, the Goldman family moved to the village of Papilė, where her father ran an inn. While her sisters worked, she became friends with a servant named Petrushka, who excited her "first erotic sensations". Later in Papilė she witnessed a peasant being whipped with a knout in the street. This event traumatized her and contributed to her lifelong distaste for violent authority.

At the age of seven, Goldman moved with her family to the Prussian city of Königsberg (then part of the German Empire), and she was enrolled in a Realschule. One teacher punished disobedient students—targeting Goldman in particular—by beating their hands with a ruler. Another teacher tried to molest his female students and was fired when Goldman fought back. She found a sympathetic mentor in her German-language teacher, who loaned her books and took her to an opera. A passionate student, Goldman passed the exam for admission into a gymnasium, but her religion teacher refused to provide a certificate of good behavior and she was unable to attend.

The family moved to the Russian capital of Saint Petersburg, where her father opened one unsuccessful store after another. Their poverty forced the children to work, and Goldman took an assortment of jobs, including one in a corset shop. As a teenager Goldman begged her father to allow her to return to school, but instead he threw her French book into the fire and shouted: "Girls do not have to learn much! All a Jewish daughter needs to know is how to prepare gefilte fish, cut noodles fine, and give the man plenty of children."

Goldman pursued an independent education on her own. She studied the political turmoil around her, particularly the Nihilists responsible for assassinating Alexander II of Russia. The ensuing turmoil intrigued Goldman, although she did not fully understand it at the time. When she read Nikolai Chernyshevsky's novel, What Is to Be Done? (1863), she found a role model in the protagonist Vera, who adopts a Nihilist philosophy and escapes her repressive family to live freely and organize a sewing cooperative. The book enthralled Goldman and remained a source of inspiration throughout her life.

Her father, meanwhile, continued to insist on a domestic future for her, and he tried to arrange for her to be married at the age of fifteen. They fought about the issue constantly; he complained that she was becoming a "loose" woman, and she insisted that she would marry for love alone. At the corset shop, she was forced to fend off unwelcome advances from Russian officers and other men. One man took her into a hotel room and committed what Goldman described as "violent contact"; two biographers call it rape. She was stunned by the experience, overcome by "shock at the discovery that the contact between man and woman could be so brutal and painful." Goldman felt that the encounter forever soured her interactions with men.

=== Rochester, New York ===
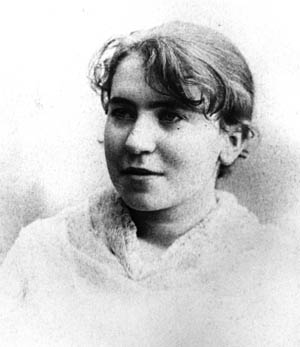
Emma Goldman in 1886

In 1885, her sister Helena made plans to move to New York in the United States to join her sister Lena and her husband. Goldman wanted to join her sister, but their father refused to allow it. Despite Helena's offer to pay for the trip, Abraham turned a deaf ear to their pleas. Desperate, Goldman threatened to throw herself into the Neva River if she could not go. Their father finally agreed. On December 29, 1885, Helena and Emma arrived at New York City's Castle Garden, the entry for immigrants.

They settled upstate, living in the Rochester home which Lena had made with her husband, Samuel. Fleeing the rising antisemitism of Saint Petersburg, their parents and brothers joined them a year later. Goldman began working as a seamstress, sewing overcoats for more than ten hours a day, earning two and a half dollars a week. She asked for a raise and was denied; she quit and took work at a smaller shop nearby.

At her new job, Goldman met a fellow worker named Jacob Kershner, who shared her love for books, dancing, and traveling, as well as her frustration with the monotony of factory work. After four months, they married in February 1887. Once he moved in with Goldman's family, their relationship faltered. On their wedding night she discovered that he was impotent; they became emotionally and physically distant. Before long he became jealous and suspicious and threatened to commit suicide should she leave him. Meanwhile, Goldman was becoming more engaged with the political turmoil around her, particularly the aftermath of executions related to the 1886 Haymarket affair in Chicago and the anti-authoritarian political philosophy of anarchism.

Less than a year after the wedding, the couple were divorced; Kershner begged Goldman to return and threatened to poison himself if she did not. They reunited, but after three months she left once again. Her parents considered her behavior "loose" and refused to allow Goldman into their home. Carrying her sewing machine in one hand and a bag with five dollars in the other, she left Rochester and headed southeast to New York City.

=== Most and Berkman ===
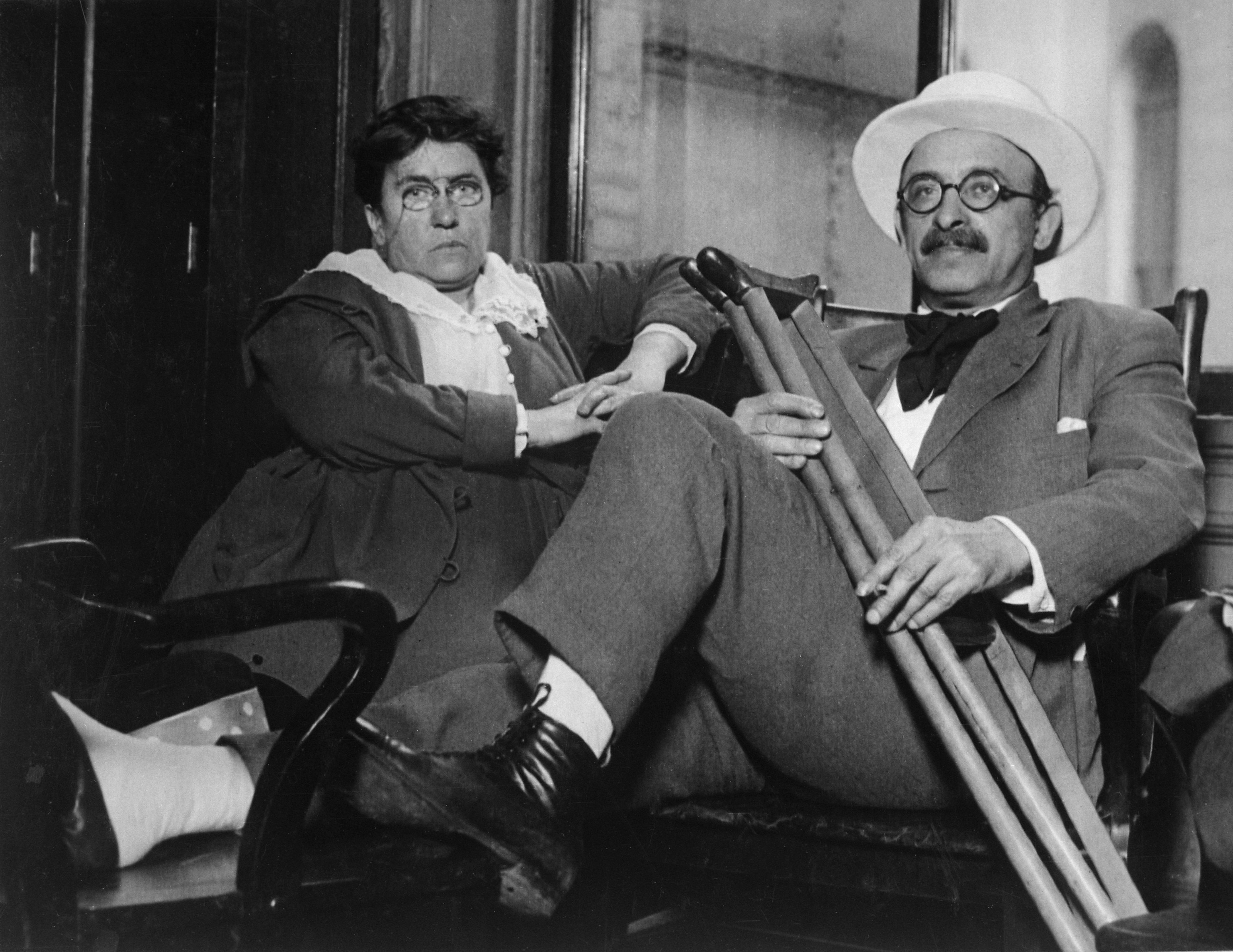
Goldman enjoyed a decades-long relationship with her lover Alexander Berkman. Photo c. 1917–1919.

On her first day in New York City, Goldman met two men who would have a significant and enduring influence on the course of her life. At Sachs' Café, a gathering place for radicals, she was introduced to Alexander Berkman, an anarchist who invited her to a public speech that evening. They went to hear Johann Most, editor of a radical publication called Freiheit and an advocate of "propaganda of the deed"—the use of violence to instigate change. She was impressed by his fiery oration, and Most took her under his wing, training her in methods of public speaking. He encouraged her vigorously, telling her that she was "to take my place when I am gone." One of her first public talks in support of "the Cause" was in Rochester. After convincing Helena not to tell their parents of her speech, Goldman found her mind a blank once on stage. She later wrote, suddenly:

something strange happened. In a flash I saw it—every incident of my three years in Rochester: the Garson factory, its drudgery and humiliation, the failure of my marriage, the Chicago crime...I began to speak. Words I had never heard myself utter before came pouring forth, faster and faster. They came with passionate intensity...The audience had vanished, the hall itself had disappeared; I was conscious only of my own words, of my ecstatic song.

Excited by the experience, Goldman refined her public persona during subsequent engagements. She quickly found herself arguing with Most over her independence. After a momentous speech in Cleveland, she felt as though she had become "a parrot repeating Most's views" and resolved to express herself on the stage. When she returned to New York, Most became furious and told her: "Who is not with me is against me!" She left Freiheit and joined another publication, Die Autonomie.

Meanwhile, Goldman had begun a friendship with Berkman, whom she affectionately called Sasha. Before long they became lovers and moved into a communal apartment with his cousin Modest "Fedya" Stein and Goldman's friend, Helene Minkin, on 42nd Street. Although their relationship had numerous difficulties, Goldman and Berkman would share a close bond for decades, united by their anarchist principles and commitment to personal equality.

In 1892, Goldman joined with Berkman and Stein in opening an ice cream shop in Worcester, Massachusetts. After a few months of operating the shop, Goldman and Berkman were diverted to participate in the Homestead Strike near Pittsburgh.

=== Homestead plot ===
Berkman and Goldman came together through the Homestead Strike. In June 1892, a steel plant in Homestead, Pennsylvania, owned by Andrew Carnegie became the focus of national attention when talks between the Carnegie Steel Company and the Amalgamated Association of Iron and Steel Workers (AA) broke down. The factory's manager was Henry Clay Frick, a fierce opponent of the union. When a final round of talks failed at the end of June, management closed the plant and locked out the workers, who immediately went on strike. Strikebreakers were brought in and the company hired Pinkerton guards to protect them. On July 6, a fight broke out between 300 Pinkerton guards and a crowd of armed union workers. During the twelve-hour gunfight, seven guards and nine strikers were killed.

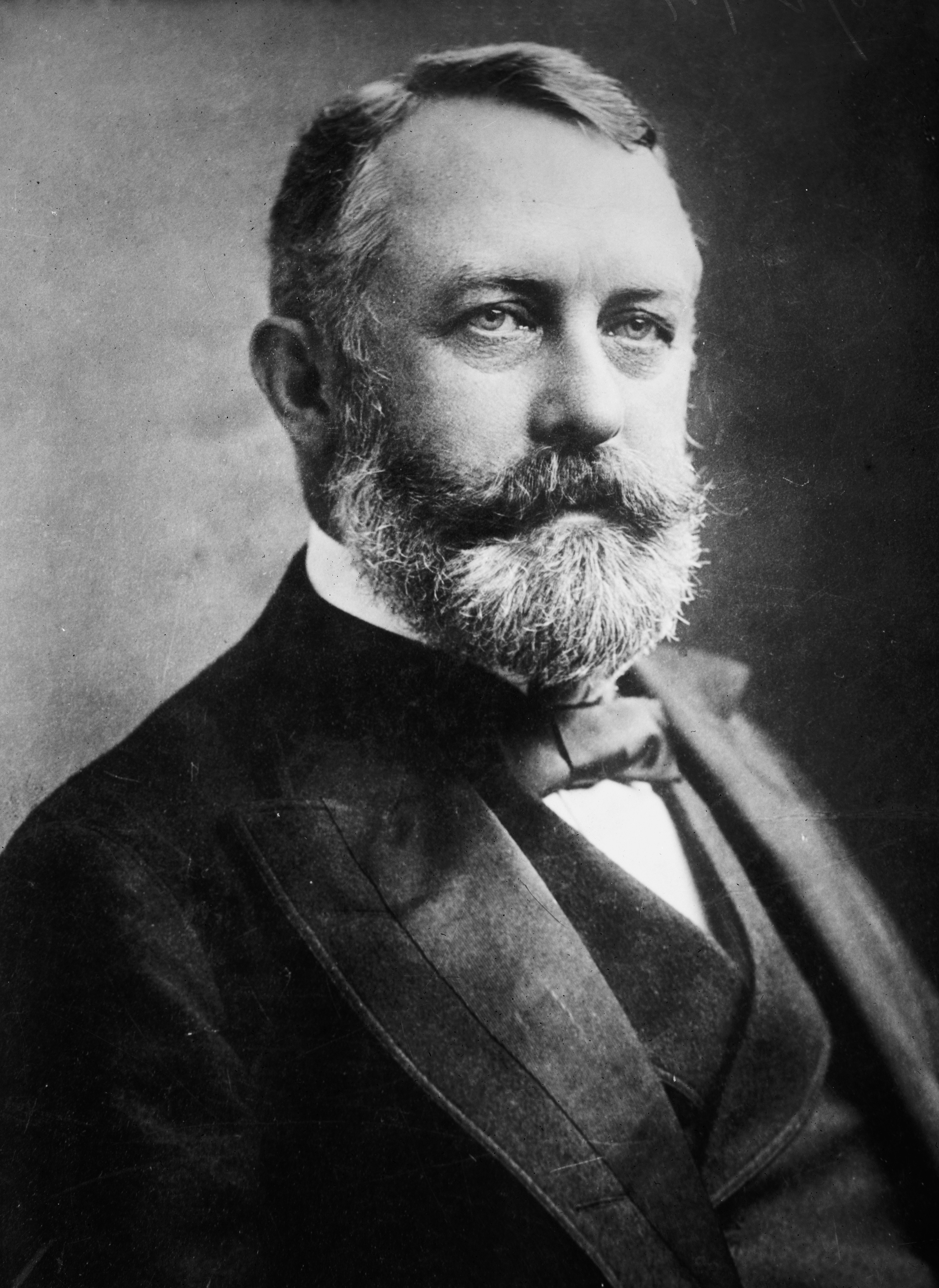
Goldman and Berkman believed that a retaliatory assassination of Carnegie Steel Company manager Henry Clay Frick (pictured) would "strike terror into the soul of his class" and "bring the teachings of Anarchism before the world".

When a majority of the nation's newspapers expressed support of the strikers, Goldman and Berkman resolved to assassinate Frick, an action they expected would inspire the workers to revolt against the capitalist system. Berkman chose to carry out the assassination and ordered Goldman to stay behind in order to explain his motives after he went to jail. He would be in charge of "the deed"; she of the associated propaganda. Berkman set off for Pittsburgh on his way to Homestead, where he planned to shoot Frick.

Goldman, meanwhile, decided to help fund the scheme through prostitution. Remembering the character of Sonya in Fyodor Dostoevsky's novel Crime and Punishment (1866), she mused: "She had become a prostitute in order to support her little brothers and sisters ... Sensitive Sonya could sell her body; why not I?" Once on the street, Goldman caught the eye of a man who took her into a saloon, bought her a beer, gave her ten dollars, informed her she did not have "the knack," and told her to quit the business. She was "too astounded for speech". She wrote to Helena, claiming illness, and asked her for fifteen dollars.

On July 23, Berkman gained access to Frick's office while carrying a concealed handgun; he shot Frick three times, and stabbed him in the leg. A group of workers—far from joining in his attentat—beat Berkman unconscious, and he was carried away by the police. Berkman was convicted of attempted murder and sentenced to 22 years in prison. Goldman suffered during his long absence.

Convinced Goldman was involved in the plot, police raided her apartment. Although they found no evidence, they pressured her landlord into evicting her. Furthermore, the attentat had failed to rouse the masses: workers and anarchists alike condemned Berkman's action. Johann Most, their former mentor, lashed out at Berkman and the assassination attempt. Furious at these attacks, Goldman brought a toy horsewhip to a public lecture and demanded, onstage, that Most explain his betrayal. He dismissed her, whereupon she struck him with the whip, broke it on her knee, and hurled the pieces at him. She later regretted her assault, confiding to a friend: "At the age of twenty-three, one does not reason."

=== "Inciting to riot" ===
When the Panic of 1893 struck in the following year, the United States suffered one of its worst economic crises. By year's end, the unemployment rate was higher than 20 percent, and "hunger demonstrations" sometimes gave way to riots. Goldman began speaking to crowds of frustrated men and women in New York City. On August 21, she spoke to a crowd of nearly 3,000 people in Union Square, where she encouraged unemployed workers to take immediate action. Her exact words are unclear: undercover agents insist she ordered the crowd to "take everything ... by force". But Goldman later recounted this message: "Well then, demonstrate before the palaces of the rich; demand work. If they do not give you work, demand bread. If they deny you both, take bread." Later in court, Detective-Sergeant Charles Jacobs offered yet another version of her speech.

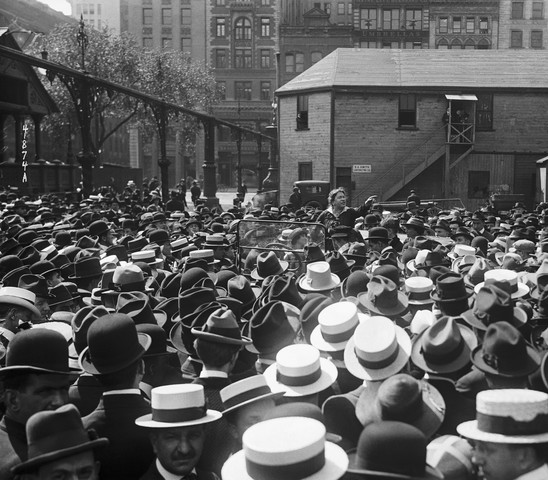
Goldman (shown here in Union Square, New York in 1916) urged unemployed workers to take direct action rather than depend on charity or government aid.

A week later, Goldman was arrested in Philadelphia and returned to New York City for trial, charged with "inciting to riot". During the train ride, Jacobs offered to drop the charges against her if she would inform on other radicals in the area. She responded by throwing a glass of ice water in his face. As she awaited trial, Goldman was visited by Nellie Bly, a reporter for the New York World. She spent two hours talking to Goldman and wrote a positive article about the woman she described as a "modern Joan of Arc."

Despite this positive publicity, the jury was persuaded by Jacobs's testimony and frightened by Goldman's politics. The assistant district attorney questioned Goldman about her anarchism, as well as her atheism; the judge spoke of her as "a dangerous woman". She was sentenced to one year in the Blackwell's Island Penitentiary. Once inside, she suffered an attack of rheumatism and was sent to the infirmary. There, she befriended a visiting doctor and received informal training in nursing, eventually being placed in charge of a 16-bed women's ward in the infirmary. She also read dozens of books, including works by the American activist-writers Ralph Waldo Emerson and Henry David Thoreau; novelist Nathaniel Hawthorne; poet Walt Whitman, and philosopher John Stuart Mill. When Goldman was released after ten months, a raucous crowd of nearly 3,000 people greeted her at the Thalia Theater in New York City. She soon became swamped with requests for interviews and lectures.

To make money, Goldman decided to continue the medical studies she had started in prison, but her preferred fields of specialization—midwifery and massage—were unavailable to nursing students in the United States. She sailed to Europe, lecturing in London, Glasgow, and Edinburgh. She met with renowned anarchists such as Errico Malatesta, Louise Michel, and Peter Kropotkin. In Vienna, she received two diplomas for midwifery and put them immediately to use back in the United States.

Alternating between lectures and midwifery, Goldman conducted the first cross-country tour by an anarchist speaker. In November 1899, she returned to Europe to speak, where she met the Czech anarchist Hippolyte Havel in London. They went together to France and helped organize what would have been the 1900 International Anarchist Congress on the outskirts of Paris. Afterward, Havel immigrated to the United States, traveling with Goldman to Chicago. They shared a residence there with friends of Goldman.

=== McKinley assassination ===
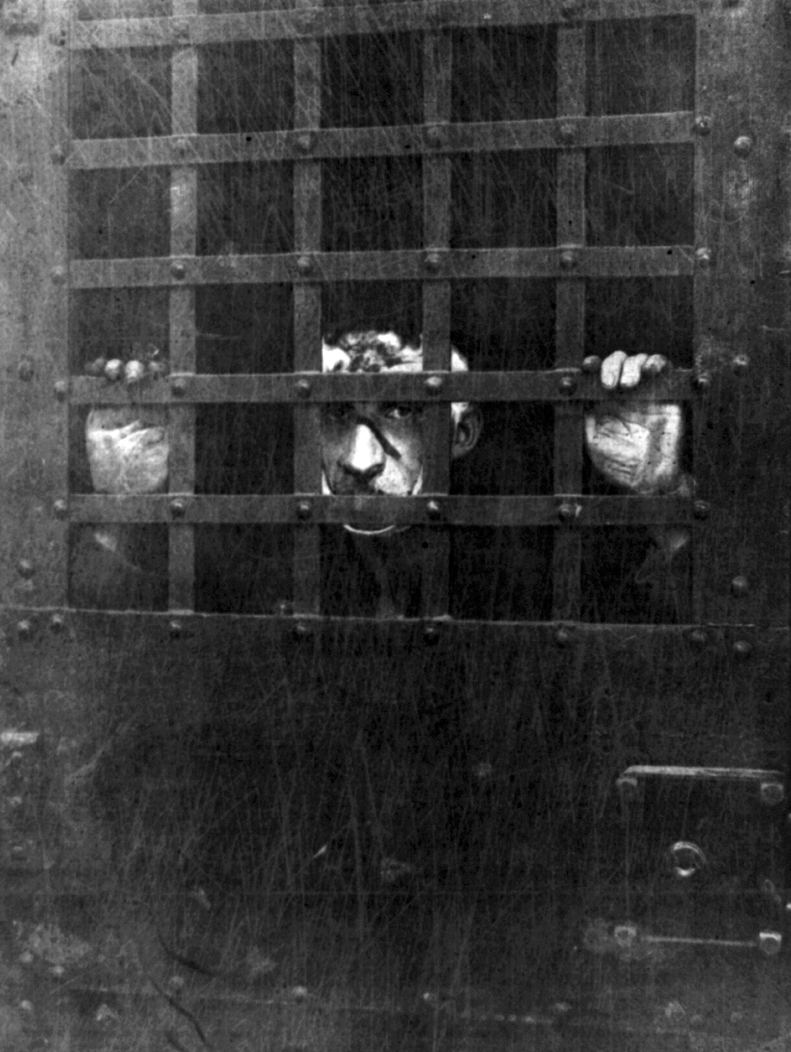
Leon Czolgosz insisted that Goldman had not guided his plan to assassinate U.S. President William McKinley, but she was arrested and held for two weeks.

On September 6, 1901, Leon Czolgosz, an unemployed factory worker and anarchist, shot U.S. President William McKinley twice during a public speaking event in Buffalo, New York. McKinley was hit in the breastbone and stomach, and died eight days later. Czolgosz was arrested, and interrogated around the clock. During interrogation he claimed to be an anarchist and said he had been inspired to act after attending a speech by Goldman. The authorities used this as a justification to charge Goldman with planning McKinley's assassination. They tracked her to the residence in Chicago she shared with Havel, as well as with Mary and Abe Isaak, an anarchist couple and their family. Goldman was arrested, along with Isaak, Havel, and ten other anarchists.

Earlier, Czolgosz had tried but failed to become friends with Goldman and her companions. During a talk in Cleveland, Czolgosz had approached Goldman and asked her advice on which books he should read. In July 1901, he had appeared at the Isaak house, asking a series of unusual questions. They assumed he was an infiltrator, like a number of police agents sent to spy on radical groups. They had remained distant from him, and Abe Isaak sent a notice to associates warning of "another spy".

Although Czolgosz repeatedly denied Goldman's involvement, the police held her in close custody, subjecting her to what she called the "third degree" (intense interrogation by police). Magistrate Prindiville ruled Goldman should be held without bail pending a preliminary hearing set for September 19, a decision Goldman challenged by declaring herself ready to act as her own attorney. When shown a dispatch claiming Czolgosz had admitted to a plot to assassinate McKinley and implicated her, Goldman responded: "I can prove that I have not been in Buffalo since I left there the latter part of August. He declares he had no one to assist him. Why should he implicate me?" She also criticized police interrogation methods, warning that they would have to use "very severe means" before obtaining a confession from her. She explained her housemates' distrust of Czolgosz, and the police finally recognized that she had not had any significant contact with the attacker. No evidence was found linking Goldman to the attack, and she was released after two weeks of detention. Before McKinley died, Goldman offered to provide nursing care, referring to him as "merely a human being". Czolgosz, despite considerable evidence of mental illness, was convicted of murder and executed.

Throughout her detention and after her release, Goldman steadfastly refused to condemn Czolgosz's actions, standing virtually alone in doing so. Friends and supporters—including Berkman—urged her to quit his cause. But Goldman defended Czolgosz as a "supersensitive being" and chastised other anarchists for abandoning him. She was vilified in the press as the "high priestess of anarchy", while many newspapers declared the anarchist movement responsible for the murder. In the wake of these events, socialism gained support over anarchism among U.S. radicals. McKinley's successor, Theodore Roosevelt, declared his intent to crack down "not only against anarchists, but against all active and passive sympathizers with anarchists".

=== Mother Earth and Berkman's release ===
After Czolgosz was executed, Goldman withdrew from society and, from 1903 to 1913, lived at 208–210 East 13th Street, New York City. Scorned by her fellow anarchists, vilified by the press, and separated from her love, Berkman, she retreated into anonymity and nursing. "It was bitter and hard to face life anew," she wrote later.

Using the name E. G. Smith, she left public life and took on a series of private nursing jobs while suffering from severe depression. The U.S. Congress's passage of the Anarchist Exclusion Act (1903) stirred a new wave of oppositional activism, pulling Goldman back into the movement. A coalition of people and organizations across the left end of the political spectrum opposed the law on grounds that it violated freedom of speech, and she had the nation's ear once again.

Following the arrest and threatened deportation of English anarchist John Turner under the Anarchist Exclusion Act, Goldman joined forces with the Free Speech League to champion Turner's cause. The league enlisted the aid of noted attorneys Clarence Darrow and Edgar Lee Masters, who took Turner's case to the U.S. Supreme Court. Although Turner and the League lost, Goldman considered it a victory of propaganda. She had returned to anarchist activism, but it was taking its toll on her. "I never felt so weighed down," she wrote to Berkman. "I fear I am forever doomed to remain public property and to have my life worn out through the care for the lives of others."

In 1906, Goldman decided to start a publication, "a place of expression for the young idealists in arts and letters". Mother Earth was staffed by a cadre of radical activists, including Hippolyte Havel, Max Baginski, and Leonard Abbott. In addition to publishing original works by its editors and anarchists around the world, Mother Earth reprinted selections from a variety of writers. These included the French philosopher Pierre-Joseph Proudhon, Russian anarchist Peter Kropotkin, German philosopher Friedrich Nietzsche, and British writer Mary Wollstonecraft. Goldman wrote frequently about anarchism, politics, labor issues, atheism, sexuality, and feminism, and was the first editor of the magazine.

Goldman's Mother Earth magazine became a home to radical activists and literary free thinkers around the United States.

On May 18 of the same year, Alexander Berkman was released from prison. Carrying a bouquet of roses, Goldman met him on the train platform and found herself "seized by terror and pity" as she beheld his gaunt, pale form. Neither was able to speak; they returned to her home in silence. For weeks, he struggled to readjust to life on the outside: an abortive speaking tour ended in failure, and in Cleveland he purchased a revolver with the intent of killing himself. Upon returning to New York, he learned that Goldman had been arrested with a group of activists meeting to reflect on Czolgosz. Invigorated anew by this violation of freedom of assembly, he declared, "My resurrection has come!" and set about securing their release.

Berkman took the helm of Mother Earth in 1907, while Goldman toured the country to raise funds to keep it operating. Editing the magazine was a revitalizing experience for Berkman. But his relationship with Goldman faltered, and he had an affair with a 15-year-old anarchist named Becky Edelsohn. Goldman was pained by his rejection of her but considered it a consequence of his prison experience. Later that year she served as a delegate from the U.S. to the International Anarchist Congress of Amsterdam. Anarchists and syndicalists from around the world gathered to sort out the tension between the two ideologies, but no decisive agreement was reached. Goldman returned to the U.S. and continued speaking to large audiences.

=== Reitman, essays, and birth control ===
For the next ten years, Goldman traveled around the country nonstop, delivering lectures and agitating for anarchism. The coalitions formed in opposition to the Anarchist Exclusion Act had given her an appreciation for reaching out to those of other political positions. When the U.S. Justice Department sent spies to observe, they reported the meetings as "packed". Writers, journalists, artists, judges, and workers from across the spectrum spoke of her "magnetic power", her "convincing presence", her "force, eloquence, and fire".

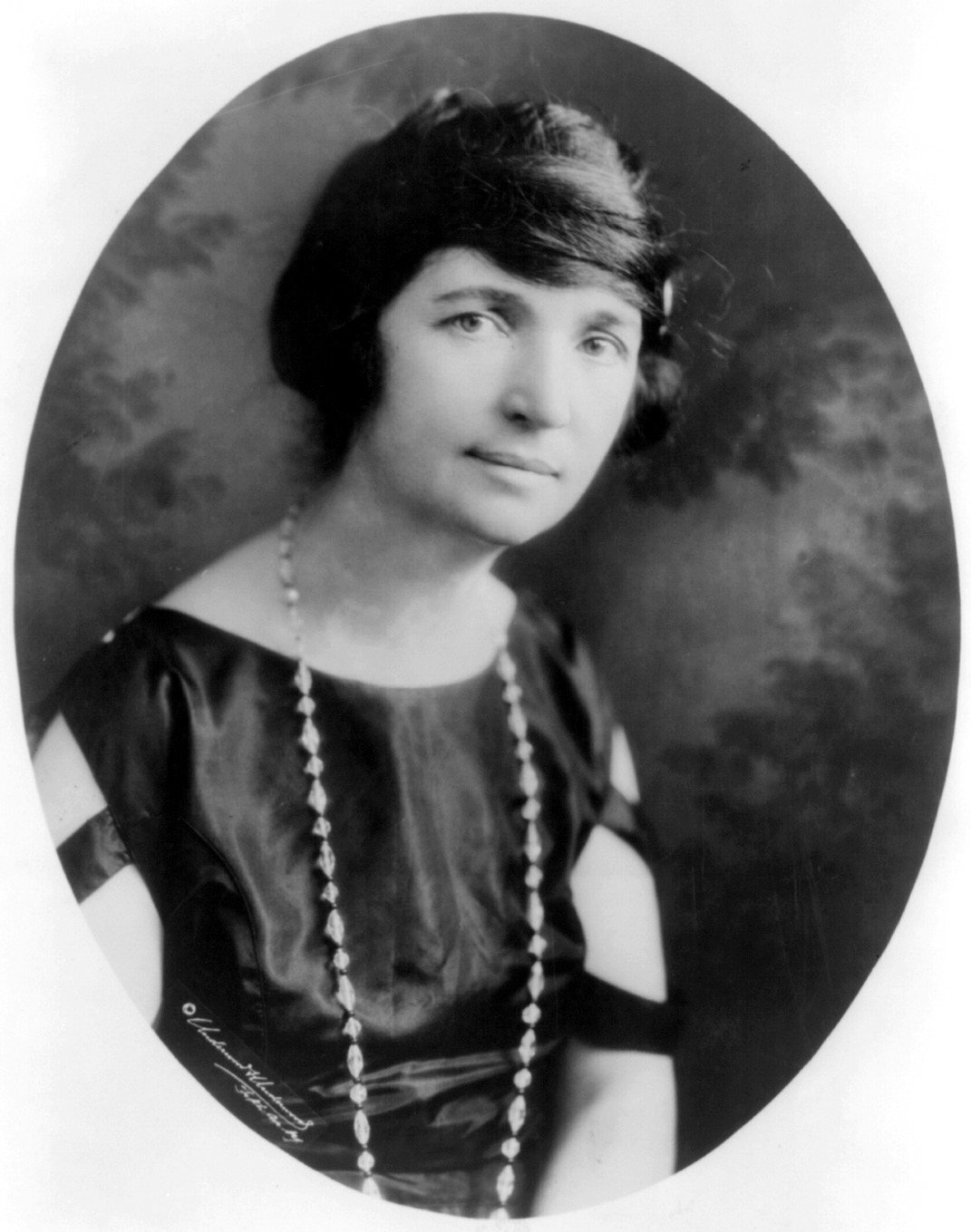
Goldman joined Margaret Sanger (pictured) in crusading for women's access to birth control; both women were arrested for violating the Comstock Law.

In the spring of 1908, Goldman met and fell in love with Ben Reitman, the so-called "Hobo doctor". Having grown up in Chicago's Tenderloin District, Reitman spent several years as a drifter before earning a medical degree from the College of Physicians and Surgeons of Chicago. As a doctor, he treated people suffering from poverty and illness, particularly venereal diseases. He and Goldman began an affair. They shared a commitment to free love and Reitman took a variety of lovers, but Goldman did not. She tried to reconcile her feelings of jealousy with a belief in freedom of the heart but found it difficult.

Two years later, Goldman began feeling frustrated with lecture audiences. She yearned to "reach the few who really want to learn, rather than the many who come to be amused". She collected a series of speeches and items she had written for Mother Earth and published a book titled Anarchism and Other Essays. Covering a wide variety of topics, Goldman tried to represent "the mental and soul struggles of twenty-one years".

When Margaret Sanger, an advocate of access to contraception, coined the term "birth control" and disseminated information about various methods in the June 1914 issue of her magazine The Woman Rebel, she received aggressive support from Goldman. The latter had already been active in efforts to increase birth control access for several years. In 1916, Goldman was arrested for giving lessons in public on how to use contraceptives. Sanger, too, was arrested under the Comstock Law, which prohibited the dissemination of "obscene, lewd, or lascivious articles", which authorities defined as including information relating to birth control.

Although they later split from Sanger over charges of insufficient support, Goldman and Reitman distributed copies of Sanger's pamphlet Family Limitation (along with a similar essay of Reitman's). In 1915 Goldman conducted a nationwide speaking tour, in part to raise awareness about contraception options. Although the nation's attitude toward the topic seemed to be liberalizing, Goldman was arrested on February 11, 1916, as she was about to give another public lecture. Goldman was charged with violating the Comstock Law. Refusing to pay a $100 fine, she spent two weeks in a prison workhouse, which she saw as an "opportunity" to reconnect with those rejected by society.

=== World War I ===
Although President Woodrow Wilson was re-elected in 1916 under the slogan "He kept us out of the war", at the start of his second term, he announced that Germany's continued deployment of unrestricted submarine warfare was sufficient cause for the U.S. to enter the Great War. Shortly afterward, Congress passed the Selective Service Act of 1917, which required all males aged 21–30 to register for military conscription. Goldman saw the decision as an exercise in militarist aggression, driven by capitalism. She declared in Mother Earth her intent to resist conscription, and to oppose U.S. involvement in the war.

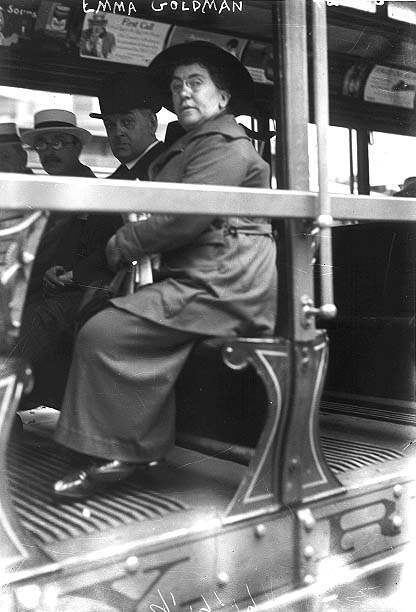
Goldman on a streetcar in 1917, perhaps during a strike or demonstration

To this end, she and Berkman organized the No Conscription League of New York, which proclaimed: "We oppose conscription because we are internationalists, antimilitarists, and opposed to all wars waged by capitalistic governments." The group became a vanguard for anti-draft activism, and chapters began to appear in other cities. When police began raiding the group's public events to find young men who had not registered for the draft, Goldman and others focused their efforts on distributing pamphlets and other writings. At a No-Conscription League meeting in the Bronx on June 5, 1917, nearly 300 patrolmen and detectives surrounded the hall, police automobiles equipped with searchlights patrolled the streets, federal agents mingled in the audience while stenographers recorded every word spoken, and three army soldiers were stationed at each door. Young men in khaki in the galleries heckled speakers; when one speaker was struck by a light bulb thrown from the gallery, Goldman came to the platform and rebuked the police for failing to prevent the soldiers from "breaking the law." In the midst of the nation's patriotic fervor, many elements of the political left refused to support the League's efforts. The Women's Peace Party, for example, ceased their peace efforts and turned to war relief once the U.S. entered the war. The Socialist Party of America took an official stance against U.S. involvement but supported Wilson in most of his activities.

On June 15, 1917, Goldman and Berkman were arrested during a raid of their offices, in which authorities seized "a wagon load of anarchist records and propaganda". The New York Times reported that Goldman asked to change into a more appropriate outfit, and emerged in a gown of "royal purple". The pair were charged with conspiracy to "induce persons not to register" under the newly enacted Espionage Act, and were held on $25,000 bail each. Defending herself and Berkman during their trial, Goldman invoked the First Amendment, asking how the government could claim to fight for democracy abroad while suppressing free speech at home:

We say that if America has entered the war to make the world safe for democracy, she must first make democracy safe in America. How else is the world to take America seriously, when democracy at home is daily being outraged, free speech suppressed, peaceable assemblies broken up by overbearing and brutal gangsters in uniform; when free press is curtailed and every independent opinion gagged? Verily, poor as we are in democracy, how can we give of it to the world?

The jury found Goldman and Berkman guilty. Judge Julius Marshuetz Mayer imposed the maximum sentence: two years' imprisonment, a $10,000 fine each, and the possibility of deportation after their release from prison. As she was transported to Missouri State Penitentiary, Goldman wrote to a friend: "Two years imprisonment for having made an uncompromising stand for one's ideal. Why that is a small price."

In prison, she was assigned to work as a seamstress, under the eye of a "miserable gutter-snipe of a 21-year-old boy paid to get results". She met the socialist Kate Richards O'Hare, who had also been imprisoned under the Espionage Act. Although they differed on political strategy—O'Hare believed in voting to achieve state power—the two women came together to agitate for better conditions among prisoners. Goldman also met and became friends with Gabriella Segata Antolini, an anarchist and follower of Luigi Galleani. Antolini had been arrested transporting a satchel filled with dynamite on a Chicago-bound train. She had refused to cooperate with authorities and was sent to prison for 14 months. Working together to make life better for the other inmates, the three women became known as "The Trinity". Goldman was released on September 27, 1919.

=== Deportation ===
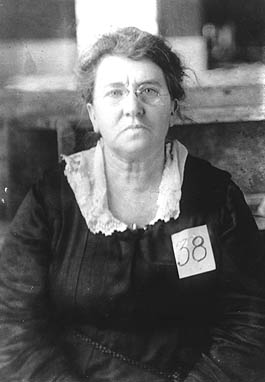
Goldman's deportation photo, 1919

Goldman and Berkman were released from prison during the United States' Red Scare of 1919–20, when public anxiety about wartime pro-German activities had expanded into a pervasive fear of Bolshevism and the prospect of an imminent radical revolution. It was a time of social unrest due to union organizing strikes and actions by activist immigrants. Attorney General Alexander Mitchell Palmer and J. Edgar Hoover, head of the U.S. Department of Justice's General Intelligence Division (now the FBI), were intent on using the Anarchist Exclusion Act and its 1918 expansion to deport any non-citizens they could identify as advocates of anarchy or revolution. "Emma Goldman and Alexander Berkman," Hoover wrote while they were in prison, "are, beyond doubt, two of the most dangerous anarchists in this country and return to the community will result in undue harm."

At her deportation hearing on October 27, 1919, Goldman refused to answer questions about her beliefs, on the grounds that her American citizenship invalidated any attempt to deport her under the Anarchist Exclusion Act, which could be enforced only against non-citizens of the U.S.. She presented a written statement instead: "Today so-called aliens are deported. Tomorrow native Americans will be banished. Already some patrioteers are suggesting that native American sons to whom democracy is a sacred ideal should be exiled." Louis Post at the Department of Labor, which had ultimate authority over deportation decisions, determined that the revocation of her husband Kershner's American citizenship in 1908 after his conviction had revoked hers as well. After initially promising a court fight, Goldman decided not to appeal his ruling.

The Labor Department included Goldman and Berkman among 249 aliens it deported en masse, mostly people with only vague associations with radical groups, who had been swept up in government raids in November. Buford, a ship the press nicknamed the "Soviet Ark", sailed from the Army's New York Port of Embarkation on December 21. Some 58 enlisted men and four officers provided security on the journey, and pistols were distributed to the crew. Most of the press approved enthusiastically. The Cleveland Plain Dealer wrote: "It is hoped and expected that other vessels, larger, more commodious, carrying similar cargoes, will follow in her wake." The ship landed her charges in Hanko, Finland, on Saturday, January 17, 1920. Upon arrival in Finland, authorities there conducted the deportees to the Russian frontier under a flag of truce.

=== Russia ===
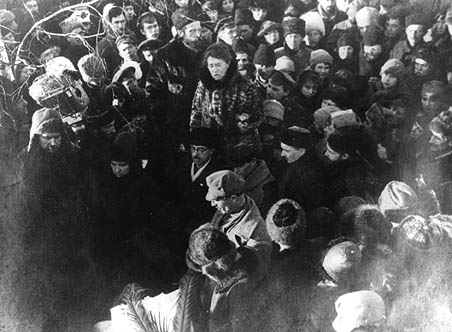
Here, Emma Goldman delivers a eulogy at Peter Kropotkin's funeral procession. Immediately in front of Goldman stands her lifelong comrade Alexander Berkman. Kropotkin's funeral was the occasion of the last great demonstration of anarchists in Moscow—tens of thousands of people poured into the streets to pay their respects.

Goldman initially viewed the Bolshevik revolution in a positive light. She wrote in Mother Earth that despite its dependence on Communist government, it represented "the most fundamental, far-reaching and all-embracing principles of human freedom and of economic well-being". By the time she neared Europe, she expressed fears about what was to come. She was worried about the ongoing Russian Civil War and the possibility of being seized by anti-Bolshevik forces. The state, anti-capitalist though it was, also posed a threat. "I could never in my life work within the confines of the State," she wrote to her niece, "Bolshevist or otherwise."

She quickly discovered that her fears were justified. Days after returning to Petrograd (Saint Petersburg), she was shocked to hear a party official refer to free speech as a "bourgeois superstition". As she and Berkman traveled around the country, they found repression, mismanagement, and corruption instead of the equality and worker empowerment they had dreamed of. Those who questioned the government were demonized as counter-revolutionaries, and workers labored under severe conditions. They met with Vladimir Lenin, who assured them that government suppression of press liberties was justified. He told them: "There can be no free speech in a revolutionary period." Berkman was more willing to forgive the government's actions in the name of "historical necessity", but he eventually joined Goldman in opposing the Soviet state's authority.

In March 1921, strikes erupted in Petrograd when workers took to the streets demanding better food rations and more union autonomy. Goldman and Berkman felt a responsibility to support the strikers, stating: "To remain silent now is impossible, even criminal." The unrest spread to the port town of Kronstadt, where the government ordered a military response to suppress striking soldiers and sailors. In the Kronstadt rebellion, approximately 1,000 rebelling sailors and soldiers were killed and two thousand more were arrested; many were later executed. In the wake of these events, Goldman and Berkman decided there was no future in the country for them. "More and more", she wrote, "we have come to the conclusion that we can do nothing here. And as we can not keep up a life of inactivity much longer we have decided to leave."

In December 1921, they left the country and went to the Latvian capital city of Riga. The U.S. commissioner in that city wired officials in Washington, D.C., who began requesting information from other governments about the couple's activities. After a short trip to Stockholm, they moved to Berlin for several years; during this time Goldman agreed to write a series of articles about her time in Russia for Joseph Pulitzer's newspaper, the New York World. These were later collected and published in book form as My Disillusionment in Russia (1923) and My Further Disillusionment in Russia (1924). The publishers added these titles to attract attention; Goldman protested, albeit in vain.

=== England, Canada, and France ===
Goldman found it difficult to acclimate to the German leftist community in Berlin. Communists despised her outspokenness about Soviet repression; liberals derided her radicalism. While Berkman remained in Berlin helping Russian exiles, Goldman moved to London in September 1924. Upon her arrival, the novelist Rebecca West arranged a reception dinner for her, attended by philosopher Bertrand Russell, novelist H. G. Wells, and more than 200 other guests. When she spoke of her dissatisfaction with the Soviet government, the audience was shocked. Some left the gathering; others berated her for prematurely criticizing the Communist experiment. Later, in a letter, Russell declined to support her efforts at systemic change in the Soviet Union and ridiculed her anarchist idealism.

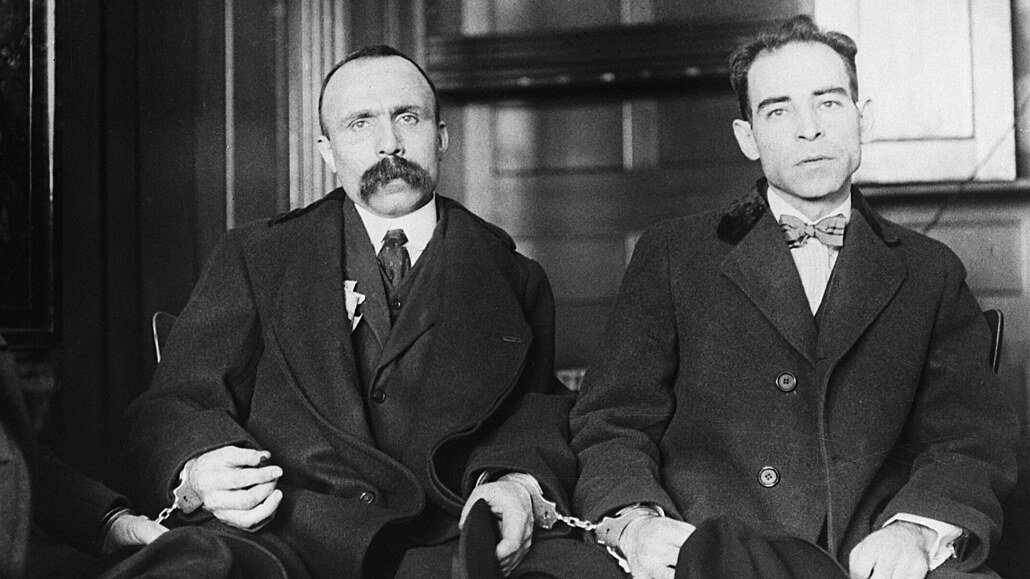
The 1927 executions of Italian anarchists Nicola Sacco (right) and Bartolomeo Vanzetti were troubling for Goldman, then living alone in Canada.

In 1925, the spectre of deportation loomed again, but James Colton, a Scottish anarchist Goldman had first met in Glasgow whilst on a speaking tour in 1895, had offered to marry her and provide British citizenship. Although they were only distant acquaintances, she accepted and they were married on June 27, 1925, Goldman's 56th birthday. Her new status gave her peace of mind and allowed her to travel to France and Canada. The pair sporadically exchanged correspondence until Colton's death in 1936. Life in London was stressful for Goldman; she wrote to Berkman: "I am awfully tired and so lonely and heartsick. It is a dreadful feeling to come back here from lectures and find not a kindred soul, no one who cares whether one is dead or alive." She worked on analytical studies of drama, expanding on the work she had published in 1914. But the audiences were "awful," and she never finished her second book on the subject.

Goldman traveled to Canada in 1927, just in time to receive news of the impending executions of Italian anarchists Nicola Sacco and Bartolomeo Vanzetti in Boston. Angered by the many irregularities of the case, she saw it as another travesty of justice in the United States. She longed to join the mass demonstrations in Boston; memories of the Haymarket affair overwhelmed her, compounded by her isolation. "Then," she wrote, "I had my life before me to take up the cause for those killed. Now I have nothing."

In 1928, she began writing her autobiography, with the support of a group of American admirers, including journalist H. L. Mencken, poet Edna St. Vincent Millay, novelist Theodore Dreiser and art collector Peggy Guggenheim, who raised $4,000 for her. She secured a cottage in the French coastal city of Saint-Tropez and spent two years recounting her life. Berkman offered sharply critical feedback, which she eventually incorporated at the price of a strain on their relationship. Goldman intended the book, Living My Life, as a single volume for a price the working class could afford (she urged no more than $5.00); her publisher Alfred A. Knopf released it as two volumes sold together for $7.50. Goldman was furious, but unable to force a change. Due in large part to the Great Depression, sales were sluggish despite keen interest from libraries around the United States. Critical reviews were generally enthusiastic; The New York Times, The New Yorker, and Saturday Review of Literature all listed it as one of the year's top non-fiction books.

In 1933, Goldman received permission to lecture in the United States under the condition that she speak only about drama and her autobiography—but not current political events. She returned to New York on February 2, 1934, to generally positive press coverage—except from Communist publications. Soon she was surrounded by admirers and friends, besieged with invitations to talks and interviews. Her visa expired in May, and she went to Toronto in order to file another request to visit the United States. This second attempt was denied. She stayed in Canada, writing articles for U.S. publications.

In February and March 1936, Berkman underwent a pair of prostate gland operations. Recuperating in Nice and cared for by his companion, Emmy Eckstein, he missed Goldman's sixty-seventh birthday in Saint-Tropez in June. She wrote in sadness, but he never read the letter; she received a call in the middle of the night that Berkman was in great distress. She left for Nice immediately, but when she arrived that morning, Goldman found that he had shot himself and was in a nearly comatose paralysis. He died later that evening.

=== Spanish Civil War ===
In July 1936, the Spanish Civil War started after an attempted coup d'état by parts of the Spanish Army against the government of the Second Spanish Republic. At the same time, the Spanish anarchists, fighting against the Nationalist forces, started an anarchist revolution. Goldman was invited to Barcelona and in an instant, as she wrote to her niece, "the crushing weight that was pressing down on my heart since Sasha's death left me as by magic". She was welcomed by the Confederación Nacional del Trabajo (CNT) and Federación Anarquista Ibérica (FAI) organizations, and for the first time in her life lived in a community run by and for anarchists, according to true anarchist principles. "In all my life", she wrote later, "I have not met with such warm hospitality, comradeship and solidarity." After touring a series of collectives in the province of Huesca, she told a group of workers: "Your revolution will destroy forever [the notion] that anarchism stands for chaos." She began editing the weekly CNT-FAI Information Bulletin and responded to English-language mail.

Goldman edited the English-language Bulletin of the Anarcho-syndicalist organizations Confederación Nacional del Trabajo (CNT) and Federación Anarquista Ibérica (FAI) during the Spanish Civil War.

Goldman began to worry about the future of Spain's anarchism when the CNT-FAI joined a coalition government in 1937—against the core anarchist principle of abstaining from state structures—and, more distressingly, made repeated concessions to Communist forces in the name of uniting against fascism. In November 1936, she wrote that cooperating with Communists in Spain was "a denial of our comrades in Stalin's concentration camps". The USSR, meanwhile, refused to send weapons to anarchist forces, and disinformation campaigns were being waged against the anarchists across Europe and the United States. Her faith in the movement unshaken, Goldman returned to London as an official representative of the CNT-FAI.

Delivering lectures and giving interviews, Goldman enthusiastically supported the Spanish anarcho-syndicalists. She wrote regularly for Spain and the World, a biweekly newspaper focusing on the civil war. In May 1937, Communist-led forces attacked anarchist strongholds and broke up agrarian collectives. Newspapers in England and elsewhere accepted the timeline of events offered by the Second Spanish Republic at face value. British journalist George Orwell, present for the crackdown, wrote: "[T]he accounts of the Barcelona riots in May ... beat everything I have ever seen for lying."

Goldman returned to Spain in September, but the CNT-FAI appeared to her like people "in a burning house". Worse, anarchists and other radicals around the world refused to support their cause. The Nationalist forces declared victory in Spain just before she returned to London. Frustrated by England's repressive atmosphere—which she called "more fascist than the fascists"—she returned to Canada in 1939. Her service to the anarchist cause in Spain was not forgotten. On her seventieth birthday, the former Secretary-General of the CNT, Mariano R. Vázquez, sent a message to her from Paris, praising her for her contributions and naming her as "our spiritual mother". She called it "the most beautiful tribute I have ever received".

=== Final years ===
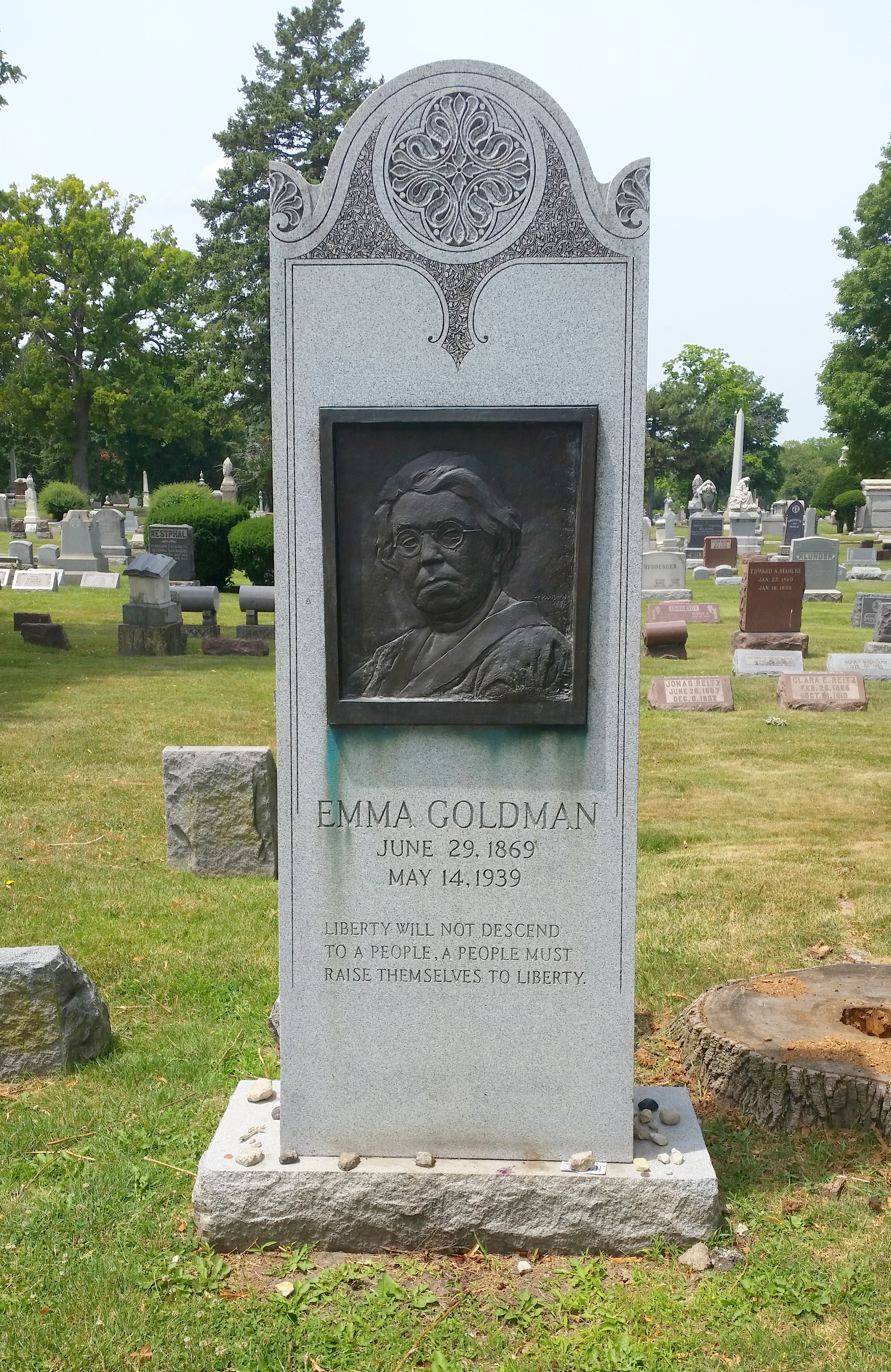
Goldman's grave in Illinois's Forest Home Cemetery, near those of the anarchists executed for the Haymarket affair. The dates on the stone are incorrect.

As the events preceding World War II began to unfold in Europe, Goldman reiterated her opposition to wars waged by governments. "[M]uch as I loathe Hitler, Mussolini, Stalin and Franco", she wrote to a friend, "I would not support a war against them and for the democracies which, in the last analysis, are only Fascist in disguise." She felt that Britain and France had missed their opportunity to oppose fascism, and that the coming war would only result in "a new form of madness in the world".

=== Death ===
On Saturday, February 17, 1940, Goldman suffered a debilitating stroke. She became paralyzed on her right side, and although her hearing was unaffected, she could not speak. As one friend described it: "Just to think that here was Emma, the greatest orator in America, unable to utter one word." For three months she improved slightly, receiving visitors and on one occasion gesturing to her address book to signal that a friend might find friendly contacts during a trip to Mexico. She suffered another stroke on May 8 and she died six days later in Toronto, aged 70.

The U.S. Immigration and Naturalization Service allowed her body to be brought back to the United States. She was buried in German Waldheim Cemetery (now named Forest Home Cemetery) in Forest Park, Illinois, a western suburb of Chicago, near the graves of those executed after the Haymarket affair. The bas relief on her grave marker was created by sculptor Jo Davidson, and the stone includes the quote "Liberty will not descend to a people, a people must raise themselves to liberty".

== Philosophy ==
Goldman spoke and wrote extensively on a wide variety of issues. While she rejected orthodoxy and fundamentalist thinking, she was an important contributor to several fields of modern political philosophy. She was influenced by many diverse thinkers and writers, including Mikhail Bakunin, Henry David Thoreau, Peter Kropotkin, Ralph Waldo Emerson, Nikolai Chernyshevsky, and Mary Wollstonecraft. Another philosopher who influenced Goldman was Friedrich Nietzsche. In her autobiography, she wrote: "Nietzsche was not a social theorist, but a poet, a rebel, and innovator. His aristocracy was neither of birth nor of purse; it was the spirit. In that respect Nietzsche was an anarchist, and all true anarchists were aristocrats."

=== Anarchism ===
Anarchism was central to Goldman's view of the world, and she is widely considered one of the most important figures in the history of anarchism and libertarian socialism. First drawn to it during the persecution of anarchists after the 1886 Haymarket affair, she wrote and spoke regularly on behalf of anarchism. In the title essay of her book Anarchism and Other Essays, she wrote:

Anarchism, then, really stands for the liberation of the human mind from the dominion of religion; the liberation of the human body from the dominion of property; liberation from the shackles and restraint of government. Anarchism stands for a social order based on the free grouping of individuals for the purpose of producing real social wealth; an order that will guarantee to every human being free access to the earth and full enjoyment of the necessities of life, according to individual desires, tastes, and inclinations.

Goldman's anarchism was intensely personal. She believed it was necessary for anarchist thinkers to live their beliefs, demonstrating their convictions with every action and word. "I don't care if a man's theory for tomorrow is correct," she once wrote. "I care if his spirit of today is correct." Anarchism and free association were to her logical responses to the confines of government control and capitalism. "It seems to me that these are the new forms of life," she wrote, "and that they will take the place of the old, not by preaching or voting, but by living them." At the same time, she believed that the movement on behalf of human liberty must be staffed by liberated humans. While dancing among fellow anarchists one evening, she was chided by an associate for her carefree demeanor. In her autobiography, Goldman wrote:

I told him to mind his own business, I was tired of having the Cause constantly thrown in my face. I did not believe that a Cause which stood for a beautiful ideal, for anarchism, for release and freedom from conventions and prejudice, should demand denial of life and joy. I insisted that our Cause could not expect me to behave as a nun and that the movement should not be turned into a cloister. If it meant that, I did not want it. "I want freedom, the right to self-expression, everybody's right to beautiful, radiant things."

==== Tactical uses of violence ====
In her political youth, Goldman held targeted violence to be a legitimate means of revolutionary struggle. At that time, she believed that the use of violence, while distasteful, could be justified in relation to the social benefits it might accrue. She advocated propaganda of the deed—attentat, or violence carried out to encourage the masses to revolt. She supported her partner Alexander Berkman's attempt to kill industrialist Henry Clay Frick, and even begged him to allow her to participate. She believed that Frick's actions during the Homestead strike were reprehensible and that his murder would produce a positive result for working people. She later wrote in her autobiography, "Yes, the end in this case justified the means." While she never gave explicit approval of Leon Czolgosz's assassination of U.S. President William McKinley, she defended his ideals and believed actions like his were a natural consequence of repressive institutions. As she wrote in "The Psychology of Political Violence" that "the accumulated forces in our social and economic life, culminating in an act of violence, are similar to the terrors of the atmosphere, manifested in storm and lightning."

Her experiences in Russia led her to qualify her earlier belief that revolutionary ends might justify violent means. In the afterword to My Disillusionment in Russia, she wrote: "There is no greater fallacy than the belief that aims and purposes are one thing, while methods and tactics are another. ... The means employed become, through individual habit and social practice, part and parcel of the final purpose ... ." In the same chapter, Goldman affirmed that "Revolution is indeed a violent process," and noted that violence was the "tragic inevitability of revolutionary upheavals". Some misinterpreted her comments on the Bolshevik terror as a rejection of all militant force, but Goldman corrected this in the preface to the first U.S. edition of My Disillusionment in Russia:

The argument that destruction and terror are part of revolution I do not dispute. I know that in the past every great political and social change necessitated violence. ... Black slavery might still be a legalized institution in the United States but for the militant spirit of the John Browns. I have never denied that violence is inevitable, nor do I gainsay it now. Yet it is one thing to employ violence in combat, as a means of defense. It is quite another thing to make a principle of terrorism, to institutionalize it, to assign it the most vital place in the social struggle. Such terrorism begets counter-revolution and in turn itself becomes counter-revolutionary.

Goldman saw the militarization of Soviet society not as a result of armed resistance per se, but of the statist vision of the Bolsheviks, writing that "an insignificant minority bent on creating an absolute State is necessarily driven to oppression and terrorism."

=== Capitalism and labor ===
Goldman believed that the economic system of capitalism was incompatible with human liberty. "The only demand that property recognizes," she wrote in Anarchism and Other Essays, "is its own gluttonous appetite for greater wealth, because wealth means power; the power to subdue, to crush, to exploit, the power to enslave, to outrage, to degrade." She also argued that capitalism dehumanized workers, "turning the producer into a mere particle of a machine, with less will and decision than his master of steel and iron." Originally opposed to anything less than complete revolution, Goldman was challenged during one talk by an elderly worker in the front row. In her autobiography, she wrote:

He said that he understood my impatience with such small demands as a few hours less a day, or a few dollars more a week.... But what were men of his age to do? They were not likely to live to see the ultimate overthrow of the capitalist system. Were they also to forgo the release of perhaps two hours a day from the hated work? That was all they could hope to see realized in their lifetime.

=== State ===
Goldman viewed the state as essentially and inevitably a tool of control and domination. As a result of her anti-state views, Goldman believed that voting was useless at best and dangerous at worst. Voting, she wrote, provided an illusion of participation while masking the true structures of decision-making. Instead, Goldman advocated targeted resistance in the form of strikes, protests, and "direct action against the invasive, meddlesome authority of our moral code". She maintained an anti-voting position even when many anarcho-syndicalists in 1930s Spain voted for the formation of a liberal republic. Goldman wrote that any power anarchists wielded as a voting bloc should instead be used to strike across the country.

Goldman disagreed with the movement for women's suffrage, which demanded the right of women to vote. In her essay "Woman Suffrage", she ridicules the idea that women's involvement would infuse the democratic state with a more just orientation: "As if women have not sold their votes, as if women politicians cannot be bought!" She agreed with the suffragists' assertion that women are equal to men but disagreed that their participation alone would make the state more just. "To assume, therefore, that she would succeed in purifying something which is not susceptible of purification, is to credit her with supernatural powers." Goldman was also critical of Zionism, which she saw as another failed experiment in state control.

Goldman was a passionate critic of the prison system, critiquing both the treatment of prisoners and the social causes of crime. Goldman viewed crime as a natural outgrowth of an unjust economic system, and in her essay "Prisons: A Social Crime and Failure", she quoted liberally from the 19th-century authors Fyodor Dostoevsky and Oscar Wilde on prisons, and wrote:

Year after year the gates of prison hells return to the world an emaciated, deformed, will-less, shipwrecked crew of humanity, with the Cain mark on their foreheads, their hopes crushed, all their natural inclinations thwarted. With nothing but hunger and inhumanity to greet them, these victims soon sink back into crime as the only possibility of existence.

Goldman was a committed war resister and was particularly opposed to the draft, viewing it as one of the worst of the state's forms of coercion, and was one of the founders of the No-Conscription League for which she was ultimately arrested and imprisoned in 1917 before being deported in 1919.

Goldman was routinely surveilled, arrested, and imprisoned for her speech and organizing activities in support of workers and various strikes, access to birth control, and in opposition to World War I. As a result, she became active in the early 20th century free speech movement, seeing freedom of expression as a fundamental necessity for achieving social change. Her outspoken championship of her ideals, in the face of persistent arrests, inspired Roger Baldwin, one of the founders of the American Civil Liberties Union. Goldman's and Reitman's experiences with vigilantism in the San Diego free speech fight in 1912 is an example of their persistence in the fight for free speech despite risking their safety.

=== Feminism and sexuality ===
Although she was hostile to the suffragist goals of first-wave feminism, Goldman advocated passionately for the rights of women, and is today heralded as a founder of anarcha-feminism, which challenges patriarchy as a hierarchy to be resisted alongside state power and class divisions. In 1897, she wrote: "I demand the independence of woman, her right to support herself; to live for herself; to love whomever she pleases, or as many as she pleases. I demand freedom for both sexes, freedom of action, freedom in love and freedom in motherhood."

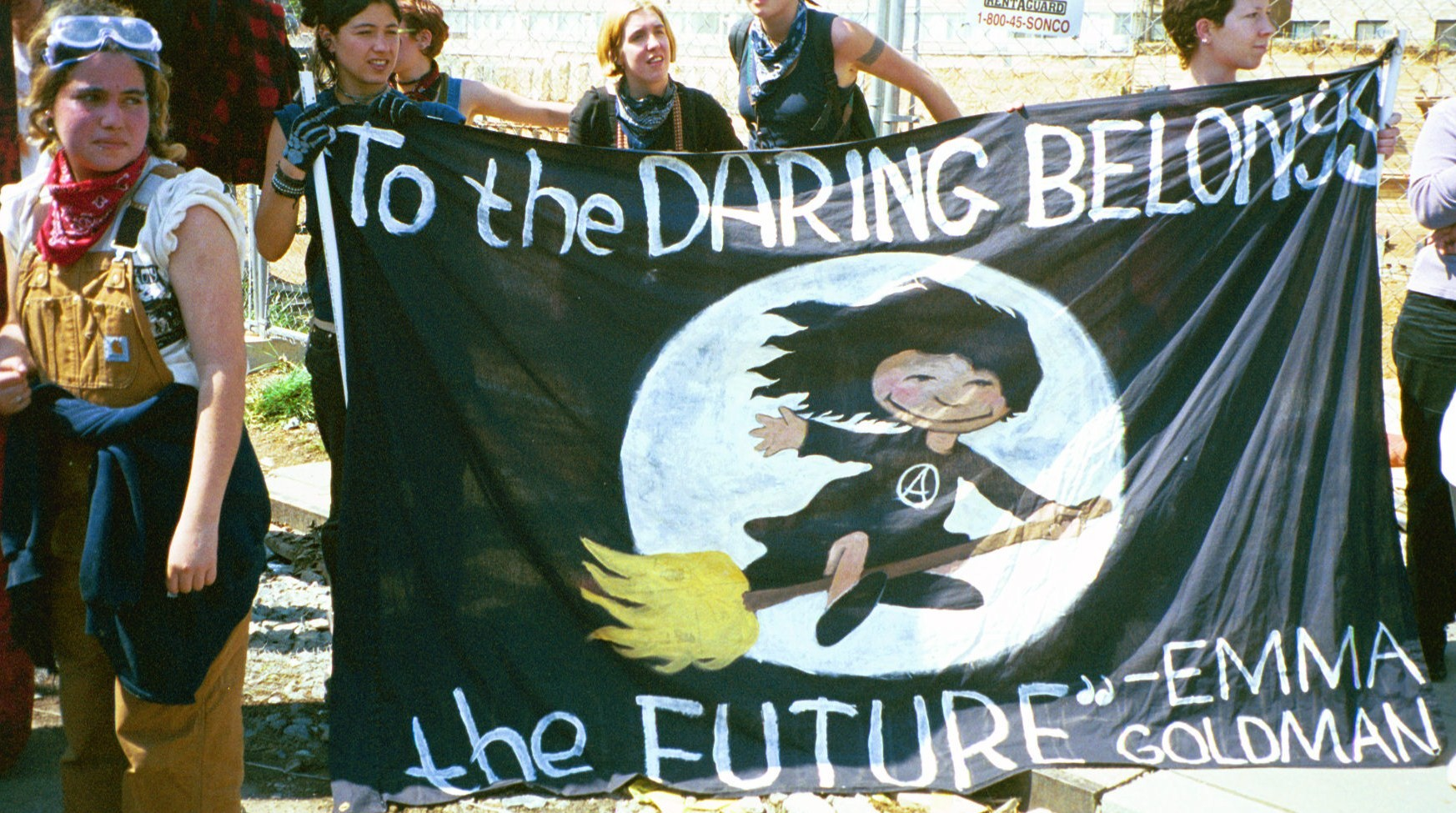
Anarcha-feminists at an anti-globalization protest quote Emma Goldman

A nurse by training, Goldman was an early advocate for educating women concerning contraception. Like many feminists of her time, she saw abortion as a tragic consequence of social conditions, and birth control as a positive alternative. Goldman was also an advocate of free love, and a strong critic of marriage. She saw early feminists as confined in their scope and bounded by social forces of Puritanism and capitalism. She wrote: "We are in need of unhampered growth out of old traditions and habits. The movement for women's emancipation has so far made but the first step in that direction."

Goldman was an outspoken critic of prejudice against homosexual and genderqueer people. Her belief that social liberation should extend to gay men and lesbians was virtually unheard of at the time, even among anarchists. As German sexologist Magnus Hirschfeld wrote, "she was the first and only woman, indeed the first and only American, to take up the defense of homosexual love before the general public." In numerous speeches and letters, she defended the right of gay men and lesbians to love as they pleased and condemned the fear and stigma associated with homosexuality. As Goldman wrote in a letter to Hirschfeld, "It is a tragedy, I feel, that people of a different sexual type are caught in a world which shows so little understanding for homosexuals and is so crassly indifferent to the various gradations and variations of gender and their great significance in life."

=== Atheism ===
A committed atheist, Goldman viewed religion as another instrument of control and domination. Her essay "The Philosophy of Atheism" quoted Bakunin at length on the subject and added:

Consciously or unconsciously, most theists see in gods and devils, heaven and hell, reward and punishment, a whip to lash the people into obedience, meekness and contentment.... The philosophy of Atheism expresses the expansion and growth of the human mind. The philosophy of theism, if we can call it a philosophy, is static and fixed.

In essays like "The Hypocrisy of Puritanism" and a speech entitled "The Failure of Christianity", Goldman made more than a few enemies among religious communities by attacking their moralistic attitudes and efforts to control human behavior. She blamed Christianity for "the perpetuation of a slave society", arguing that it dictated individuals' actions on Earth and offered poor people a false promise of a plentiful future in heaven.

== Legacy ==
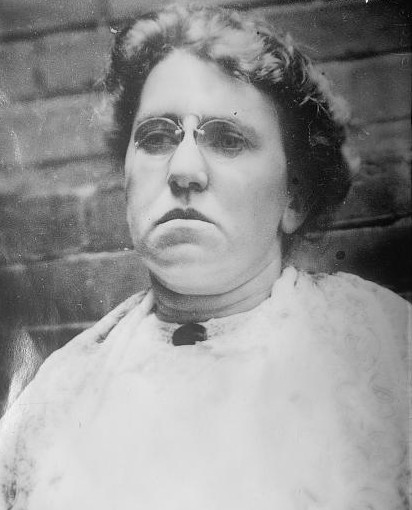
Goldman's image, often accompanying a popular paraphrase of her ideas—"If I can't dance, I don't want to be in your revolution"—has been reproduced on countless walls, garments, stickers, and posters as an icon of freedom.

Goldman was well known during her life, described as—among other things—"the most dangerous woman in America". After her death and through the middle part of the 20th century, her fame faded. Scholars and historians of anarchism viewed her as a great speaker and activist but did not regard her as a philosophical or theoretical thinker on par with, for example, Peter Kropotkin.

In 1970, Dover Press reissued Goldman's autobiography, Living My Life, and in 1972, feminist writer Alix Kates Shulman issued a collection of Goldman's writing and speeches, Red Emma Speaks. These works brought Goldman's life and writings to a larger audience, and she was in particular lionized by the women's movement of the late 20th century. In 1973, Shulman was asked by a printer friend for a quotation by Goldman for use on a T-shirt. She sent him the selection from Living My Life about "the right to self-expression, everybody's right to beautiful, radiant things", recounting that she had been admonished "that it did not behoove an agitator to dance". The printer created a statement based on these sentiments that has become one of the most famous quotations attributed to Goldman even though she probably never said or wrote it as such: "If I can't dance I don't want to be in your revolution." Variations of this saying have appeared on thousands of T-shirts, buttons, posters, bumper stickers, coffee mugs, hats, and other items.

The women's movement of the 1970s that "rediscovered" Goldman was accompanied by a resurgent anarchist movement, beginning in the late 1960s, that also reinvigorated scholarly attention to earlier anarchists. The growth of feminism also initiated some reevaluation of Goldman's philosophical work, with scholars pointing out Goldman's contributions to anarchist thought in her time. Goldman's belief in the value of aesthetics, for example, can be seen in the later influences of anarchism and the arts. Similarly, Goldman is now given credit for influencing and broadening the scope of activism on issues of sexual liberty, reproductive rights, and freedom of expression.

Goldman has been honored by a number of organizations named in her memory. The Emma Goldman Clinic, a women's health center in Iowa City, Iowa, selected Goldman as its namesake "in recognition of her challenging spirit." Red Emma's Bookstore Coffeehouse, an infoshop in Baltimore, Maryland, adopted her name out of their belief "in the ideas and ideals that she fought for her entire life: free speech, sexual and racial equality and independence, the right to organize in our jobs and in our own lives, ideas and ideals that we continue to fight for, even today".

== In popular culture ==
Goldman has been depicted in numerous works of fiction.

In the historical novel Anarchists in Love (2025, Douglas & McIntyre), author Robert Hough re-imagines the lives of Emma Goldman and Alexander "Sasha" Berkman when she lived in New York City from 1890, exploring how their documented torrid relationship seeded the anarchist movement in the US, culminating in the attempted assassination of wealthy industrialist Henry C. Frick.

The character of Goldman appeared in Warren Beatty's 1981 film Reds, in which she was portrayed by Maureen Stapleton, who won an Academy Award for her performance.

Goldman is a character in the Broadway musicals Tintypes, Ragtime, and Assassins. Plays depicting Goldman's life include: Howard Zinn's play, Emma; Martin Duberman's Mother Earth; Jessica Litwak's Love, Anarchy, and Other Affairs (about Goldman's arrest in connection with McKinley's assassination); Lynn Rogoff's Love Ben, Love Emma (about Goldman's relationship with Reitman); Carol Bolt's Red Emma; and Alexis Roblan's Red Emma and the Mad Monk.

Ethel Mannin's 1941 novel Red Rose is based on Goldman's life. Lisa Norton portrays Goldman in three episodes of the period detective series Murdoch Mysteries.

== Works ==
Goldman was a prolific writer, penning countless pamphlets and articles on a diverse range of subjects. She authored six books, including an autobiography, Living My Life, and a biography of fellow anarchist Voltairine de Cleyre.

=== Books ===
- Anarchism and Other Essays. New York: Mother Earth Publishing Association, 1910.
- The Social Significance of the Modern Drama. Boston: Gorham Press, 1914.
- My Disillusionment in Russia. Garden City, New York: Doubleday, Page and Co., 1923.
- My Further Disillusionment in Russia. Garden City, New York: Doubleday, Page and Co., 1924.
- Living My Life. New York: Knopf, 1931.
- Voltairine de Cleyre. Berkeley Heights, New Jersey: Oriole Press, 1932.

=== Edited collections ===
- Alix Kates Shulman, ed., Red Emma Speaks: Selected Writings and Speeches. New York: Random House, 1972. ISBN 0-394-47095-8.
- Emma Goldman: A Documentary History of the American Years, Volume 1 – Made for America, 1890–1901. Berkeley: University of California Press, 2003. ISBN 0-520-08670-8.
- Emma Goldman: A Documentary History of the American Years, Volume 2 – Making Speech Free, 1902–1909. Berkeley: University of California Press, 2004. ISBN 0-520-22569-4.
- Emma Goldman: A Documentary History of the American Years, Volume 3 – Light and Shadows, 1910–1916. Stanford: Stanford University Press, 2012. ISBN 0-8047-7854-X.
- Red Emma speaks : an Emma Goldman reader, compiled and edited by Alix Kates Shulman. New York : Schocken Books, 1983.

== See also ==
- Emma Goldman: The Anarchist Guest
- Emma or Emma: A Play in Two Acts about Emma Goldman, American Anarchist, a play by Howard Zinn
- Birth control movement in the United States
- John R. Coryell
- Rosa Luxemburg
- List of peace activists
- List of women's rights activists

== Bibliography ==
- Berkman, Alexander (1992). Fellner, Gene (ed.). Life of an Anarchist: The Alexander Berkman Reader. Four Walls Eight Windows. ISBN 978-0-941423-77-9. OCLC 24905653.
- Chalberg, John (1991). Handlin, Oscar (ed.). Emma Goldman: American Individualist. HarperCollins. ISBN 978-0-673-52102-6. OCLC 22629881.
- Drinnon, Richard (1961). Rebel in Paradise: A Biography of Emma Goldman. University of Chicago Press. OCLC 266217.
- Falk, Candace (1984). Love, Anarchy, and Emma Goldman. Holt, Rinehart, & Winston. ISBN 978-0-03-043626-0. OCLC 9918504.
- —, ed. (2003). Emma Goldman: A Documentary History of the American Years, Vol. 1: Made for America, 1890–1901. University of California Press. ISBN 978-0-520-08670-8.
- —, ed. (2004). Emma Goldman: A Documentary History of the American Years, Vol. 2: Making Speech Free, 1902–1909. University of California Press. ISBN 978-0-520-22569-5.
- Goldman, Emma (1969) [1917]. Anarchism and Other Essays (3rd ed.). Dover Publications. ISBN 978-0-486-22484-8. OCLC 1089171334.
- — (1970a) [1931]. Living My Life. Dover Publications. ISBN 978-0-486-22543-2. OCLC 93436.
- — (1970b) [1923]. My Disillusionment in Russia. Thomas Y. Crowell Co. OCLC 76645.
- — (1970c). The Traffic in Women and Other Essays on Feminism. Times Change Press. ISBN 978-0-87810-001-9. OCLC 22596878.
- Haaland, Bonnie (1993). Emma Goldman: Sexuality and the Impurity of the State. Black Rose Books. ISBN 978-1-895431-64-3. OCLC 27678158.
- Marshall, Peter (1992). Demanding the Impossible: A History of Anarchism. HarperCollins. ISBN 978-0-00-217855-6.
- McCormick, Charles H (1997). Seeing Reds: Federal Surveillance of Radicals in the Pittsburgh Mill District, 1917–1921. University of Pittsburgh Press. ISBN 978-0-585-09911-8. OCLC 42331016.
- Murray, Robert K. (1955). Red Scare: A Study in National Hysteria, 1919–1920. University of Minnesota Press. OCLC 420192.
- Post, Louis F. (1923). The Deportations Delirium of Nineteen-Twenty: A Personal Narrative of an Historic Official Experience. Charles H. Kerr & Company. OCLC 394684.
- Pribanic-Smith, Erika J.; Schroeder, Jared (2018). Emma Goldman's No-Conscription League and the First Amendment. Routledge. ISBN 978-1-351-02797-7. OCLC 1066179265.
- Wexler, Alice (1984). Emma Goldman: An Intimate Life. Pantheon Books. ISBN 978-0-394-52975-2. OCLC 9970895.
- — (1989). Emma Goldman in Exile: From the Russian Revolution to the Spanish Civil War. Beacon Press. ISBN 978-0-8070-7004-8. OCLC 19353853.
