= Olga Taratuta =

Ukrainian anarchist (1876–1938)

Babushka Olga Taratuta
- Ольга Таратута
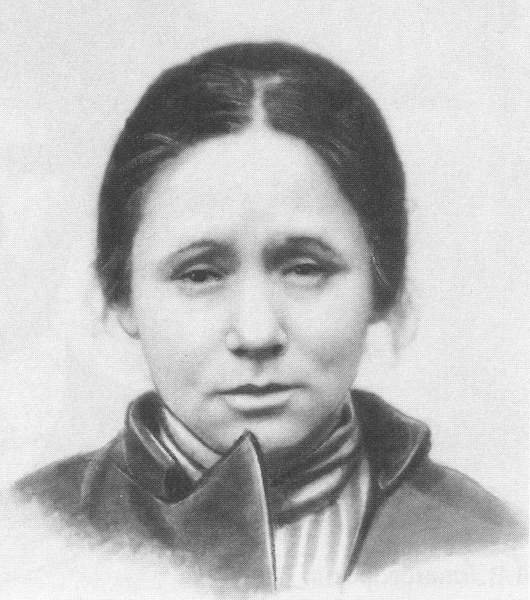
- Mugshot of Taratuta (1905)
- Born: Elka Illivna Ruvinska; 1874 or 1876; Novodmytrivka Persha, Taurida, Russian Empire
- Died: 8 February 1938 (aged 62); Kommunarka, Moscow, Soviet Union
- Cause of death: Execution by shooting
- Organization: Anarchist Black Cross (1919–1933)
- Known for: Terrorism, prisoner support
- Political party: Social Democratic Labour Party (1898–1903)
- Other political affiliations: Chernoe Znamia (1903–1909); Nabat (1920)
- Movement: Anarchism in Ukraine
- Criminal charges: Anti-Soviet agitation
- Criminal penalty: Capital punishment
- Spouse: Oleksandr Taratuta
- Children: Leonid Taratuta (b. 1903)
- Family: Khasya Erdalievska (sister); Roza Vilenska (sister)

Olha Illivna Taratuta (Ukrainian: О́льга Іллівна Тарату́та; (Note: Commonly known by the Russian: Ольга Таратута, romanized: Olga Taratuta.) 1876–1938) was a Ukrainian Jewish anarchist and a founder of the Anarchist Black Cross (ABC).

Taratuta joined the Social Democratic Labour Party (SDLP) during its founding in 1898, but within a few years moved towards more radical anarchist positions. She became a leading figure in the Odesa anarchist communist movement, organising a terrorist campaign against Russian imperial officials. After a number of years she was finally caught and imprisoned by the Tsarist authorities.

She was released from prison during the February Revolution and immediately dedicated herself to prisoner support work, first through the Political Red Cross and then later establishing the Anarchist Black Cross. For her activities, she was arrested and imprisoned by the Bolshevik government. She continued to organise international campaigns for Soviet political prisoners even after her release. During the Great Purge, Taratuta was charged with anti-Soviet agitation, sentenced to death, and executed by shooting.

== Biography ==
=== Early life and activism ===
Taratuta was born Elka Ruvinska, (Note: From the Yiddish: אלקא רוווינסקא.) in 1874 or 1876, into a Jewish family in the southern Ukrainian village of Novodmytrivka Persha, in the Taurida Governorate of the Russian Empire. After completing her education, she became a teacher in Yelisavethrad.

In 1895, she was arrested for socialist political activism, and in 1897, she joined the Yelisavethrad branch of the South Russian Workers' Union, led by Juda Grossman. In 1898, she became a member of the newly founded Social Democratic Labour Party (SDLP).

In 1901, she fled to Switzerland, where she began working for the SDLP's newspaper Iskra (English: Spark). After meeting the party's leaders Georgi Plekhanov and Vladimir Lenin in early 1903, she quickly became disillusioned with the social democrats and joined the emigrant Ukrainian anarchist movement. In this group, she met Oleksandr Taratuta, whom she married, taking his last name.

=== Terrorist campaign ===
By 1904, the Ukrainian port city of Odesa had become a hotspot of anarchist activity, led by the city's Jewish population. In early 1904, Olha and Oleksandr, as well as Olha's sister Khasya and her husband Kapel Erdalievskyi, arrived in the city. There they joined the anarchist Union of the Irreconcilable (Ukrainian: Союзу непримиренних), which local police believed to have been behind the assassination of Russian Interior Minister Vyacheslav von Plehve.

In April 1904, a number of the Irreconcilables were arrested in a sweep. Olha Taratuta and her sister Rosa were detained on suspicion of being connected to the assassin Stepan Balmashov, but no evidence of such was found and they were released in September 1904. After her release, Taratuta and her sister Khasya brought the remnants of the Irreconcilables together into the South Russian Group of Anarchist-Communists. Before she was even thirty years old, Taratuta had adopted the nom de guerre of Babuskha (English: Granny) and gained a reputation as a leading figure in the Odesa anarchist movement. In January 1905, the police opened another case against Taratuta, but failed to gather enough evidence to keep her under arrest. By April 1905, she was speaking publicly at political rallies, and by July 1905, the police dropped charges against her, although they kept the anarchist-communist group under surveillance.

During the 1905 Russian Revolution, Taratuta and other members of the anarchist-communist group joined a militant organization known as the Black Banner (Ukrainian: Чорний прапор), which launched out a campaign of what they called "motiveless terror" (Ukrainian: безмотивний терор) against Russian institutions and officials. By December 1905, rumours of a coming antisemitic pogrom began to spread around Odesa and the city's anarchists responded by carrying out bomb attacks against Tsarist officials. On 17 December 1905, Taratuta's cell carried out a bomb attack against the Libman Café, aiming to kill those they called "exploiters" who frequented the café. In the wake of the attacks, they published a leaflet declaring:

"Let terror, personal and mass, spread in a wide wave throughout the country! Let the bourgeoisie feel that the working class has finally risen up, not to play politics with it, but to completely destroy it and seize its property."

Within a week of the attack, the group was arrested. In November 1906, the tribunal of the Odesa Military District pronounced its sentence against the group: Moisei Metz, Yosip Brunstein and Beilya Shershevska were hanged; while Olha Taratuta herself had her death sentence commuted on account of her two-year-old son Leonid, and was sentenced to seventeen years of penal labour.

Out of the 167 anarchists and sympathizers that were arrested in the post-revolutionary repression, 28 were eventually executed and only five escaped. Taratuta herself escaped from her Odesa prison on 15 December 1906. She fled to Moscow, where she established the anarchist group Rebel (Russian: Бунтар), a cell of the Chernoe Znamia. After many of the group's members were arrested in March 1907, she fled again to Switzerland. In Geneva, she edited the group's homonymous newspaper, but quickly became tired of life in exile and decided to return home.

In August 1907, the anarchist exiles held a conference in Geneva, where they established a Union of Russian Anarchist-Communists and a militant "Combat Detachment", which they tasked with igniting another revolution in the Russian Empire. Taratuta was appointed to head the anarchist terror detachment in Odesa and granted 7,000 rubles for the task. In late 1907, Taratuta returned once again to Odesa, where she organised an anarchist prison break and carried out an armed robbery of a factory, stealing 3,200 rubles.

Along with fellow Chernoe Znamia member Vladimir Striga, she joined the Intransigents (Ukrainian: Непримиримі), which was made up of anarchists and other followers of Jan Wacław Machajski. As head of the combat detachment, Taratura planned attentats against a number of Tsarist officials, including the Odesa Military District commander Alexander von Kaulbars and Odesa mayor Ivan Tolmachev. She also planned a bombing of the Odesa tribunal while it was in session. But the police thwarted these plans before they could be carried out, due to information gathered from informants, and 50 of the combat detachment's members were arrested in February 1908.

That same month, Taratuta moved on to Kyiv, where she made a botched attempt at breaking out anarchists that were incarcerated in Lukyanivska Prison. She was arrested the following month and sentenced to 21-years of penal labour, joining her compatriots in Lukyanivska. Her collaborators, Andriy Shtokman and Serhiy Borisov, were hanged.

=== Revolutionary activities ===
She was released in March 1917, following the February Revolution, as part of a general amnesty that freed hundreds of anarchist prisoners. Following the formation of the Ukrainian State in May 1918, she established a branch of the Political Red Cross in Kyiv, which provided aid for hundreds of political prisoners of various affiliations.

Although she had initially kept her distance from the anarchist movement, by mid-1920, the growing political repression of anarchists by the Bolshevik government inspired Taratuta to join the Nabat Confederation of Anarchist Organizations. Following the ratification of the Starobilsk agreement by the Ukrainian Soviet Socialist Republic and the Makhnovshchina, Taratuta returned to Ukraine. In the Ukrainian Soviet capital of Kharkiv, she established the Anarchist Black Cross to provide aid to imprisoned and exiled anarchists. In November 1920, she represented the Makhnovshchina at negotiations with the government for the provision of autonomous status to the Makhnovist region. She also participated in the Nabat's preparations for an All-Russian Anarchist Conference in the city.

=== Underground agitation ===
After the conclusion of the siege of Perekop in late-November 1920, the Bolsheviks unleashed a new wave of repression against the Ukrainian anarchists. In Kharkiv, Taratuta and other leaders of the Nabat were arrested. In January 1921, the arrested Nabat members were transferred to Moscow's Butyrka prison. The following month, she and her fellow prisoners were permitted to attend Peter Kropotkin's funeral, but returned to prison immediately after. In April 1921, she was severely beaten by her guards, who had her forcibly transferred to Orlov, where she was kept in a politisolator. The following month, she was offered a release on the condition that she publicly denounce her anarchist beliefs, but she refused. Instead, she joined her fellow anarchist prisoners in an 11-day hunger strike.

In March 1922, Taratuta was exiled to the Vologda Governorate in the Russian North, along with her comrade Anastasia Stepanova-Halayeva. After their release in 1924, they moved to Kyiv, where they immediately moved to reconstitute the Ukrainian anarchist movement underground. According to Viktor Bilash, Taratuta established contact with Ukrainian anarchist exiles on the other side of the Polish border, maintaining communications with the movement abroad and smuggling literature back into the Soviet Union. In March of that year, she was arrested for publishing anarchist propaganda, but following the intervention of the anarchist-turned-Bolshevik Georgy Pyatakov, she was swiftly released.

She moved to Moscow later that year, aided by the Society of Political Prisoners and Exiles, but quickly withdrew from the Society after she denounced it as an organ of the State Political Directorate (GPU). She moved back to Kyiv, where Stepanova-Halayeva died in October 1925 and Taratuta published Stepanova-Halayeva's memoirs in the magazine Kandalnyi Zvon. Taratuta also decided to release her own account of her time in the Lukyanivska Prison, which was published in Hard Labour and Exile: History of the Revolutionary Movement in Russia.

In January 1927, she returned to Odesa, taking a job at the House of Revolutionary Veteran, while she clandestinely worked to rebuild the local militant anarchist movement. At a secret anarchist meeting chaired by Taratuta, the possibility of a war between the Soviet Union and the Entente was discussed, with the majority resolving to defend Ukraine if it was ever invaded. In February 1927, Taratuta attended the funeral of the anarchist Lev Tarlo, during which she gave a speech that the GPU considered to be anti-Soviet agitation. Taratuta's return to Odesa spurred the Soviet authorities into action. They discovered that the local anarchist movement had experienced a resurgence of activity, finding a number of anarchist cells among the city's dockers, metalworkers and rail workers, and unveiling Taratuta's cross-border Anarchist Black Cross network. After a series of anarchist leaflets were published which called for strike actions, wage increases and the release of political prisoners, Taratuta was arrested on charges of anarchist agitation, but insufficient evidence was found and she was released.

In the summer of 1927, she joined the international campaign to support Sacco and Vanzetti, circulating anarchist leaflets that compared the repression of the pair in America with the anti-anarchist repression in the Soviet Union. With the Anarchist Black Cross, Taratuta established a Sacco and Vanzetti defence committee, for which she was arrested by the GPU. Although she was quickly released, she demanded that she be re-arrested in protest of the continued detention of her comrade Noi Varshavsky. But the GPU considered it "inappropriate" to arrest her, as they wanted to keep tabs on her network. In October 1927, she moved back to Kyiv, where the GPU noted that she met Aron Baron's wife Fanya Ovrutska.

The GPU initially planned to hold a show trial of Ukrainian anarchists, but decided to shelve this plan in favour of a mass sweep of the anarchist underground in Odesa. In January 1929, they arrested 16 anarchists for allegedly organising a regional conference and distributing revolutionary leaflets. One of the detained anarchists testified that they were attempting to reconstitute an all-Ukrainian anarchist federation, with contacts in other cities and with anarchist exiles. Taratuta was named as one of the three leaders of the underground anarchist movement in Ukraine, which the GPU believed was being controlled by an anarchist "centre" in Moscow, followed the Organizational Platform devised by Nestor Makhno and Peter Arshinov and was considering the formation of a united front with the Trotskyists.

In the ensuing repression, Taratuta herself was arrested and sentenced to three years in the politisolator. At the end of 1931, she was released from prison and returned to Moscow. In the Russian capital, she continued her correspondence with the Odesa anarchists, discussing Makhno and Arshinov's Platform with those who visited her. In May 1933, she was arrested again, this time on account of her continued correspondence with the Paris-based Anarchist Black Cross. After she was released from internal exile in 1936, she immediately returned to work as a driller in a Muscovite metal factory, although by that point she was old and sick.

Taratuta was arrested for the final time during the Great Purge. On 27 November 1937, Taratuta was detained on charges of anti-Soviet agitation. On 8 February 1938, she was condemned to death by the Supreme Court and shot the same day. In the concluding words of his biography on Taratuta, Viktor Savchenko said:

Olha Taratuta and other "underground" anarchists, under the influence of the horrific terrorism of the "dictatorship of the proletariat", were imbued with the ideas of democracy and became the first "human rights activists" in the USSR. The feminism of the revolutionary years was crushed by patriarchal norms that Joseph Stalin took out of an old drawer.

== See also ==
- Halyna Kuzmenko – Ukrainian anarchist (1897–1978)
- Maria Nikiforova – Ukrainian anarchist (1885–1919)
- Mollie Steimer – Ukrainian anarchist activist (1897–1980)
- Milly Witkop – Anarchist and feminist (1877–1955)
- Lev Zadov – Ukrainian counter-intelligence agent (1893–1938)

== Bibliography ==
- Avrich, Paul (1971) [1967]. The Russian Anarchists. Princeton: Princeton University Press. ISBN 0-691-00766-7. OCLC 1154930946.
- Dubovik, Anatoly (2009). "The Anarchist underground in the Ukraine in the 1920s and 1930s: Outlines of history". After Makhno. Translated by Szarapow. Kate Sharpley Library. pp. 1–14. ISBN 9781873605844.
- Dubovik, Anatoly (2022). "Introduction, Afterword and Notes". In Archibald, Malcolm (ed.). The Kiev Lukyanovskaya Convict Prison. Kate Sharpley Library. pp. 1–9.
- Maximoff, G. P. (1975) [1940]. "The Sacco-Vanzetti case in Russia". The Guillotine at Work: Twenty Years of Terror in Russia. New York: Revisionist Press. pp. 567–568. ISBN 0-87700-203-7.
- Savchenko, Viktor (March 2021). "«Бабуся анархії». Ольга Таратута – феномен жінки у революційну добу (1903-1938)" [«Grandmother of Anarchy». Olha Taratuta – the Phenomenon of Women in the Revolutionary Era (1903-1938)]. Antiquities of Lukomorie (in Ukrainian). 2 (5): 100–107. doi:10.33782/2708-4116.2021.2.66. ISSN 2708-4116. OCLC 8974700808. S2CID 233682518.
