= Chudinovo =

Chudinovo (Russian: Чудиново) is the name of several rural localities in Russia:

- Chudinovo, Arkhangelsk Oblast, a village in Vyysky Selsoviet of Verkhnetoyemsky District of Arkhangelsk Oblast
- Chudinovo, Chelyabinsk Oblast, a selo in Chudinovsky Selsoviet of Oktyabrsky District of Chelyabinsk Oblast
- Chudinovo, Kirov Oblast, a selo in Podgorodny Rural Okrug of Orlovsky District of Kirov Oblast
- Chudinovo, Leningrad Oblast, a village in Osminskoye Settlement Municipal Formation of Luzhsky District of Leningrad Oblast
- Chudinovo, Moscow Oblast, a village in Barantsevskoye Rural Settlement of Chekhovsky District of Moscow Oblast
- Chudinovo, Nizhny Novgorod Oblast, a village in Grudtsinsky Selsoviet of Pavlovsky District of Nizhny Novgorod Oblast
- Chudinovo, Novgorod Oblast, a village in Velikoselskoye Settlement of Starorussky District of Novgorod Oblast
- Chudinovo, Novosibirsk Oblast, a selo in Maslyaninsky District of Novosibirsk Oblast
- Chudinovo, Perm Krai, a village in Nytvensky District of Perm Krai
- Chudinovo, Kimrsky District, Tver Oblast, a village in Kimrsky District, Tver Oblast
- Chudinovo, Kuvshinovsky District, Tver Oblast, a village in Kuvshinovsky District, Tver Oblast
- Chudinovo, Vladimir Oblast, a village in Vyaznikovsky District of Vladimir Oblast
- Chudinovo, Vologda Oblast, a village in Andronovsky Selsoviet of Kaduysky District of Vologda Oblast
- Chudinovo, Chudinovsky Rural Okrug, Bolsheselsky District, Yaroslavl Oblast, a village in Chudinovsky Rural Okrug of Bolsheselsky District of Yaroslavl Oblast
- Chudinovo, Markovsky Rural Okrug, Bolsheselsky District, Yaroslavl Oblast, a village in Markovsky Rural Okrug of Bolsheselsky District of Yaroslavl Oblast
- Chudinovo, Borisoglebsky District, Yaroslavl Oblast, a village in Yakovtsevsky Rural Okrug of Borisoglebsky District of Yaroslavl Oblast
- Chudinovo, Osetsky Rural Okrug, Lyubimsky District, Yaroslavl Oblast, a village in Osetsky Rural Okrug of Lyubimsky District of Yaroslavl Oblast
- Chudinovo, Osetsky Rural Okrug, Lyubimsky District, Yaroslavl Oblast, a village in Osetsky Rural Okrug of Lyubimsky District of Yaroslavl Oblast
- Chudinovo, Glebovsky Rural Okrug, Rybinsky District, Yaroslavl Oblast, a village in Glebovsky Rural Okrug of Rybinsky District of Yaroslavl Oblast
- Chudinovo, Mikhaylovsky Rural Okrug, Rybinsky District, Yaroslavl Oblast, a village in Mikhaylovsky Rural Okrug of Rybinsky District of Yaroslavl Oblast
- Chudinovo, Tutayevsky District, Yaroslavl Oblast, a village in Velikoselsky Rural Okrug of Tutayevsky District of Yaroslavl Oblast
