= ABCF =

ABCF may refer to:

- Anarchist Black Cross Federation
- American Breast Cancer Foundation
- ABC Family, a cable channel
- AIIMS Bhopal Club de Football
