= Louise Berger =

Russian Latvian anarchist

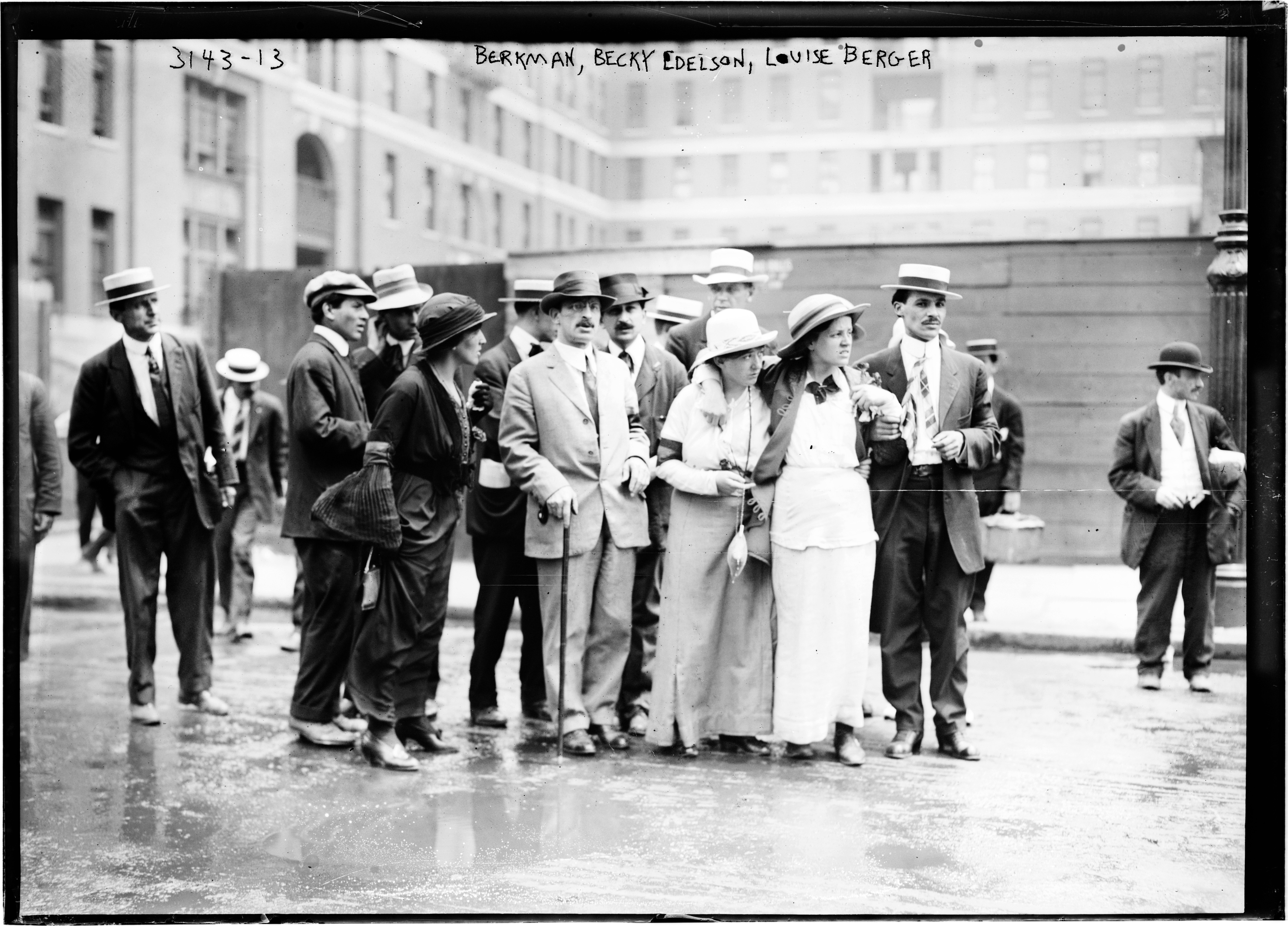
Alexander Berkman, Becky Edelson, and Louise Berger circa 1914

Louise Berger was a Russian Latvian anarchist, a member of the Anarchist Red Cross, and editor of Emma Goldman's Mother Earth Bulletin in New York. Berger became well known outside anarchist circles in 1914 after a premature bomb explosion at her New York City apartment (known as the Lexington Avenue bombing), which killed four persons and destroyed part of the building.

== Early life ==
Berger was born in Latvia in the 1890s. Around 1905, she left Latvia for Western Europe. In Hamburg, Germany she met two other Latvian Anarchist Red Cross members, Charles Berg and Carl Hanson (her stepbrother), and accompanied them to New York City in 1911. When the three arrived in New York, the three joined the Lettish (Latvian) Anarchist Group, an organization primarily devoted to the publication and dissemination of anarchist literature. However, when a number of comrades organized a Lettish Anarchist Red Cross in December 1913, the three became some of its first members.

== Tarrytown and the Lexington Avenue Bombing ==
During this same period, Berger, Berg, and Hanson also became active in anarchist labor rights groups and the Anti-Military League. Most of these organizations used the Ferrer Center at their hub for activities. Here people like Alexander Berkman, Emma Goldman, Luigi Galleani, and members of the Anarchist Red Cross and the Industrial Workers of the World spent a great deal of their time. During these meetings, plans were made to stage protests at the Tarrytown, New York estate of Standard Oil magnate John D. Rockefeller, owner of the Ludlow mines in Colorado.

The Ludlow Massacre in Colorado and police dispersal of the Tarrytown protests enraged most radicals. In June, members of the Lettish Anarchist Red Cross, including Berg, Hanson, Berger, and IWW member Arthur Caron began plotting a bomb attack to assassinate Rockefeller.

Berg, Hanson, and Caron began to collect dynamite from various sources, storing it in Louise Berger's apartment on New York's Lexington Avenue. Meetings were held at the Ferrer Center, where the conspirators devised a plan in which Berg, Hanson, and Caron would to plant a bomb at Rockefeller's home in Tarrytown. The plot was scheduled for July 3, but for reasons unknown, the plan was called off at the last moment. The three men returned to Berger's apartment from Tarrytown with bomb in hand.

At 9 a.m. on July 4, 1914, Louise Berger left her apartment and walked to the office of the Anarchist newspaper known as the Mother Earth Bulletin, where she worked as an editor alongside Alexander Berkman. It has been assumed by some who knew her that Berger was going there to inform Berkman that the bomb had been readjusted and was ready. At 9:15 an explosion occurred from Berger's apartment at 1626 Lexington Avenue. Passers-by witnessed a shower of debris and rubble fall into the street. Jack Isaacson, a newspaper editor who lived around the corner from Berger, recalled a man's arm falling from the Lexington Avenue building into the street in front of him. The three upper floors of the building were wrecked, while debris showered rooftops and the streets below. Large pieces of furniture were thrown hundreds of feet in the air by the blast.

The bomb had exploded prematurely, killing Carl Hanson, Charles Berg and Arthur Caron. A fourth person, Marie Chavez, was also killed. The blast threw Caron's body onto the mangled and twisted fire escape. The mutilated bodies of Marie Chavez and Hanson were found inside of the apartment. The blast had torn the body of Charles Berg into pieces, which were seen by spectators being thrown through the air onto the streets. In total, twenty other people were injured, seven of them severely enough to be hospitalized. Another man, an IWW member named Mike Murphy, was spending the night in the apartment, when the explosion occurred. Berkman and Berger attended the men's funerals. Berkman would later state that the Lexington Avenue explosion was the most meaningful anarchist event since the Haymarket riot. On July 20, 1914 Berger and two other women visited jailed hunger striker Rebecca Edelsohn, who was protesting her confinement for failure to pay a $300 fine for speaking disrespectfully of the American flag.

== The Manifesto and life in Soviet Russia ==
Louise Berger remained active in the United States anarchist movement for three more years. In 1917, after the October Revolution in Russia, she decided to leave the United States to return to her homeland and assist in the worker's revolution. Alexander Berkman and Emma Goldman had recently finished compiling a communique to their comrades in Russia titled Manifesto to the Russian Workers, Peasants, and Soldiers! to explain the state of the U.S. antiwar movement, in particular the recent imprisonment of Thomas Mooney and Warren Billings, convicted of the Preparedness Day bombings of 1916. Goldman and Berkman entrusted Louise Berger, (according to Goldman, one of "our closest and most dependable friends") with a copy of the manifesto to take with her on her journey to Russia. Berger sailed from New York in August 1917 bound for Russia, along with journalist John Reed and several other prominent radicals. On the voyage out she met another returnee, Senya Fleshin, and became his lover.

Back in Russia, Berger and Fleshin rejoined other anarchists participating in the revolution. She eventually parted with Fleshin and traveled to Odessa, where she reportedly carried out "bank expropriations" as an armed robber (naletchiki) during the chaos of the Revolution. According to one source, she fell ill and died during the typhus epidemic that swept Russia in 1920 and 1921. Another source claims that she was liquidated along with other anarchists by Bolshevik Cheka or Red Army security forces during Trotsky's campaign against 'anarcho-bandits' and other dissident movements.

== See also ==
- Anarchist Red Cross
- Emma Goldman
- Mother Earth (magazine)

== Sources ==
- Avrich, Paul, The Modern School Movement, AK Press (2005)
- Avrich, Paul, Sacco and Vanzetti: the Anarchist Background, Princeton University Press (1991)
- Avrich, Paul, Anarchist Voices: An Oral History, Princeton University Press (1996)
- Goldman, Emma, Living My Life, 1st ed., New York: Alfred A. Knopf (1931), p. 597.
