= Lexington Avenue explosion =

1914 premature explosion of a terrorist bomb on July 4

Coordinates: 40°47′25″N 73°56′53″W

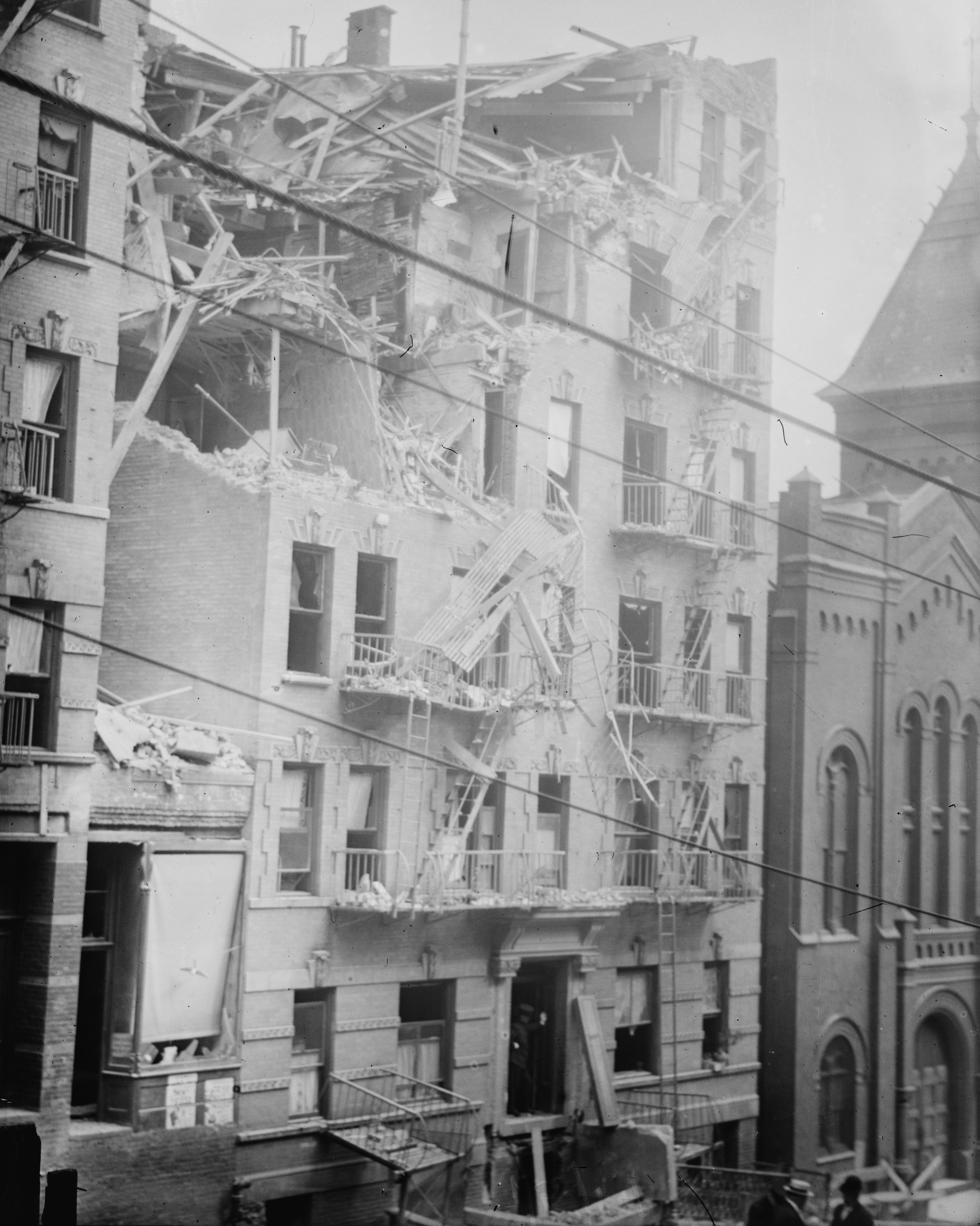
- 1626 Lexington Avenue in Manhattan, July 4, 1914
- Location: 1626 Lexington Avenue, New York City, New York, U.S.
- Date: July 4, 1914; 9:00 am
- Deaths: 4 (including 3 conspirators)
- Injuries: Dozens

The Lexington Avenue explosion was the July 4, 1914, explosion of a terrorist bomb in an apartment at 1626 Lexington Avenue in New York City. Members of the Lettish section of the Anarchist Black Cross (ABC) were constructing a bomb in a seven-story tenement when the group's large supply of dynamite exploded prematurely. The blast destroyed most of the top three floors of the building, killing three conspirators and another renter who was not part of the bomb plot, as well as injuring dozens more.

== The conspirators ==
In July 1914, two members of the Lettish section of the Anarchist Red Cross (ARC), Charles Berg and Carl Hanson, began collecting dynamite they had obtained from Russia. Plotting with them was Industrial Workers of the World (IWW) member Arthur Caron. They stored the dynamite at the apartment of another ARC member, Louise Berger, who was an editor of Emma Goldman's Mother Earth magazine. Several meetings were held at the Ferrer Center, where the group devised a plan in which Caron, Berg, and Hanson were to plant a bomb at John D. Rockefeller's home in Tarrytown, New York.

According to later accounts, the three men, along with Alexander Berkman and Charles Robert Plunkett, met at the Ferrer Center at least twice to discuss the plot. Plunkett, a party to the conspiracy, later stated that Berkman chose to remain behind the scenes rather than take an active role in the bombing due to his being on probation for the attempted murder of Henry Clay Frick. Berkman later denied any involvement or knowledge of the plan, a denial supported by some who knew him, and rejected by others. Plunkett also claimed that neither Rockefeller nor his house were intended to be the target of the bomb, and that its detonation in Tarrytown would be merely a "gesture of protest." Indeed, there was an explosion and massive fire in Tarrytown at 6:30pm on July 4, 1914, at the Westchester Lighting Company, nearly consuming the lighting company's gas holders, and only a short distance from the gasoline and oil tanks of Rockefeller's Standard Oil.

== Explosion ==
At 9 a.m. on July 4, Berger left her tenement building at 1626 Lexington Avenue and went to the Mother Earth offices on 119th Street. Fifteen minutes later, a deadly explosion took place on the sixth story of the Lexington Avenue building, located between 102nd and 103rd Streets in the thickly populated area of Harlem, only a few blocks away from the Ferrer Center. The explosion was said to have caused a deafening sound wave. The New York Times compared the noise level to "a broadside from a battleship". Passers-by witnessed a shower of debris and rubble fall into the street. The three upper floors of the tenement building were destroyed by the explosion, while debris showered rooftops and the streets below. Hundreds of windows in nearby buildings were also shattered. Large pieces of furniture were thrown hundreds of feet through the air due to the power of the blast.

The bomb intended for Rockefeller had exploded prematurely inside Berger's apartment, killing Hanson, Berg, Caron and Marie Chavez, who had apparently not been involved in the conspiracy but had merely rented a room in the apartment. The blast threw Caron's body onto the mangled and twisted fire escape. The mutilated bodies of Chavez and Hanson were found inside the apartment. The blast had torn the body of Berg into pieces, which were seen by spectators being thrown through the air onto the streets. In total, twenty other people were injured, seven of them severely enough to be hospitalized. Berkman attended the men's funerals. Berger later denied any involvement, and police were unable to implicate her in the conspiracy.

Another IWW member named "Mike" Murphy was spending the night in the same apartment when the explosion occurred. The blast destroyed the floor underneath him, causing his bed to fall into the apartment below. Slightly dazed and confused, Murphy was able to walk away from the incident with only the loss of some clothes and a few minor bruises. He was immediately sought for questioning by the police but was able to slip away to Mother Earth headquarters, where it is believed that Berkman sent him into hiding, accompanied by fellow co-conspirator Plunkett. Murphy was first taken to New Jersey, then to Philadelphia by members of the Radical Library, and finally on to Canada.

== Aftermath ==
The deaths of the bomb makers did not end the attacks against Rockefeller and his company, Standard Oil. On November 19, 1915, another bomb plot was discovered, this time against John D. Archbold, President of Standard Oil, at his home in Tarrytown. Police theorized the bomb was planted by anarchists and IWW radicals as a protest against the execution of IWW member Joe Hill in Salt Lake City, Utah. The bomb was discovered by a gardener who found four sticks of dynamite, weighing one pound (0.45 kg) each, half hidden in a rut in a driveway fifty feet (15 m) from the front entrance of the residence. The dynamite sticks were bound together by a length of wire, fitted with percussion caps, and wrapped with a piece of paper matching the color of the driveway, a path used by Archbold in going to or from his home by automobile. The bomb was later defused by police.

== Gallery ==
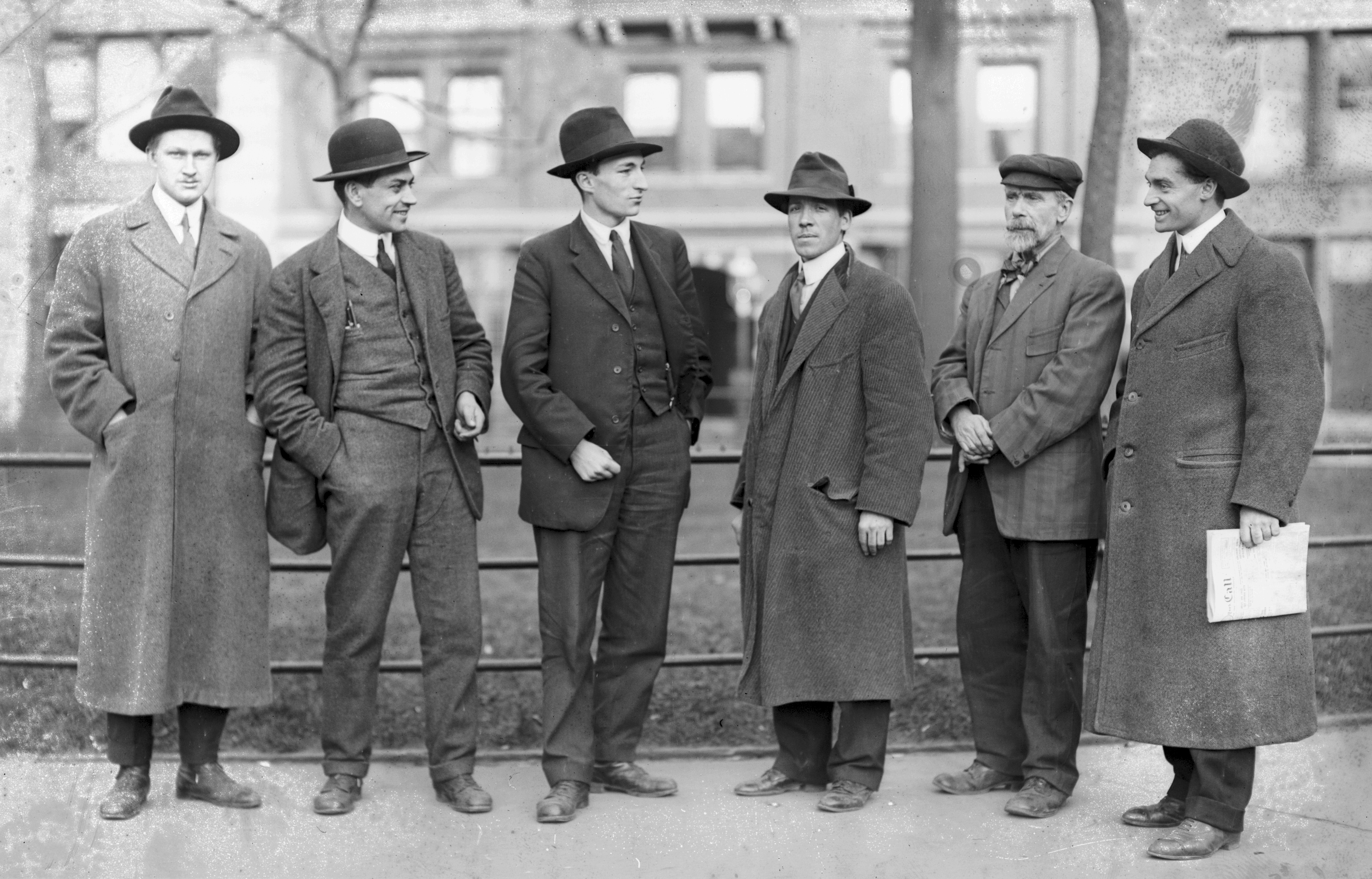
The IWW committee. Left to right are: Sullivan, Caron, Plunkett, Turner, Woolman. Arthur Caron and Charles Plunkett who were implicated in the bombing

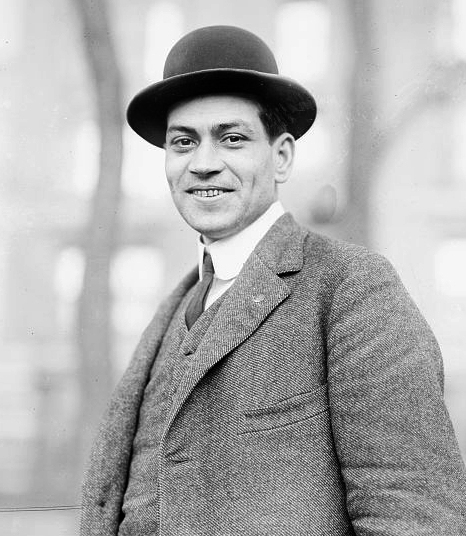
Arthur Caron circa 1914

== See also ==
- Greenwich Village townhouse explosion
- Domestic terrorism in the United States
- Anarchism and violence
- Propaganda of the deed
- September 1920 Wall Street bombing
- Palmer Raids
- Espionage Act of 1917
- 1919 United States anarchist bombings
- Milwaukee Police Department bombing

== Bibliography ==
Notes

References

- Avrich, Paul (1991). Sacco and Vanzetti: The Anarchist Background. Princeton University Press. ISBN 9780691047898. - Total pages: 265
- Avrich, Paul (1996). Anarchist Voices: An Oral History of Anarchism in America. Princeton University Press. ISBN 9780691044941. - Total pages: 323
- Johnson, Steven (May 17, 2024). "When Dynamite Turned Terrorism Into an Everyday Threat". The New York Times Sunday Magazine.
- The New York Times (July 5, 1914). "Exploded in Apartment Occupied by Tarrytown Disturbers. Only One Escaped Alive". The New York Times. ISSN 1553-8095. OCLC 1645522. "A large quantity of dynamite, which the police and certain friends of the leaders of the I. W. W. believe was being made into a bomb to be used in blowing up John D. Rockefeller's Tarrytown home, exploded prematurely at 9:16 o'clock in the upper story or on the roof of the new seven-story model tenement house at 1,626 Lexington Avenue."
- The New York Times (July 10, 1914c). "PLAN BIG MEETING FOR DEAD BOMB MEN; Demonstration in Union Square by Anti-Militarist League Announced for Tomorrow" (abstract). The New York Times. New York City, New York, United States. p. 1.
- The New York Times (November 22, 1915). "Dynamite Bomb For J.D. Archbold". New York Times (Online). Adolph Ochs. ISSN 1553-8095. OCLC 1645522.
- The New York Times (February 16, 1915b). "BERKMAN REVEALS ANARCHISTS' PLOT; Says Bomb Which Killed Makers Last July Was Meant for Rockefellers. DENIES HE KNOWS SCHMIDT But W. J. Burns, Who Caught Alleged Dynamiter, Thinks the Two Men Are Acquainted" (abstract). The New York Times. New York City, New York, United States. p. 1.
