= Khalturin =

Khalturin (Russian: Халтурин) is a Russian masculine surname, its feminine counterpart is Khalturina. It may refer to

- Marina Khalturina (born 1974), Soviet-Kazakhstani figure skater
- Stepan Khalturin (1856–1882), Russian revolutionary
