= Propaganda of the deed =

Political action meant to catalyse revolution

Propaganda of the deed, or propaganda by the deed, is a type of direct action intended to influence public opinion. The action itself is meant to serve as an example for others to follow, acting as a catalyst for social revolution. It is often associated with acts of violence perpetrated by various anarchists in the late 19th and early 20th century, including bombings and assassinations aimed at the state, the ruling class in a spirit of anti-capitalism, and church arsons targeting religious groups, even though propaganda of the deed also has non-violent applications.

These acts of terrorism were intended to ignite a "spirit of revolt" by demonstrating the state, the middle and upper classes, and religious organizations were not omnipotent as well as to provoke the State to become escalatingly repressive in its response. The 1881 London Social Revolutionary Congress gave the tactic its approval.

== Theoretical development ==
=== Formulation ===
The foundations of propaganda of the deed were first laid in the early 19th century, when members of the student counterculture began to call for revolutionary action. An early invocation of propaganda by the deed (Italian: propaganda dei fatti) was first outlined by the Italian socialist Carlo Pisacane in 1857. Pisacane rejected "propaganda of the idea", as he believed that "ideas result from deeds" and that "people will not be free when they are educated, but educated when they are free." To Pisacane, all citizens of a country ought to cooperate with social revolution; he specified conspiracies and assassination attempts as examples of ways citizens could contribute to a social revolution. The theory of propaganda by the deed was formalised in 1869 by the Russian revolutionaries Mikhail Bakunin and Sergey Nechayev, who favoured insurrectionary direct action over "pointless propaganda" which had no basis in reality. In August 1870, Bakunin called for revolutionaries to put their ideas into practice, propagating revolutionary principles through deeds, rather than words. He believed that revolutionary actors ought to focus on acts of destruction, which he considered a necessary prelude to any social revolution.

=== Elaboration by Italian anarchists ===
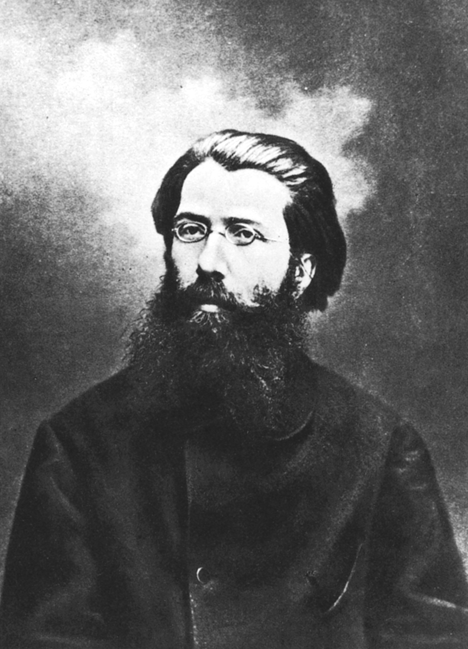
Carlo Cafiero, one of the main proponents of propaganda by the deed in the early Italian anarchist movement

In the wake of the suppression of the Paris Commune and rising political repression against the left-wing, during the 1870s, many European anarchists became impatient with gradualist methods such as education and industrial action. They instead turned towards propaganda by the deed, which they saw as a means to accelerate social change and bring about a revolution. When Italian activists such as Carlo Cafiero, Andrea Costa and Errico Malatesta joined the nascent anarchist movement, they organised political demonstrations and strike actions, with the aim of inciting an uprising that would escalate into a generalised insurrection. In 1874, Costa and Malatesta planned an insurrection in Bologna, but they were arrested by the Carabinieri before they made it to the city.

After the defeat of the Bologna insurrection, Cafiero and Malatesta adopted the doctrine of propaganda by the deed. They believed that symbolic actions could drive workers and peasants towards revolution, and encouraged members of the international anarchist movement to engage in violent action. At the 1876 Bern Congress of the Anti-authoritarian International, Malatesta argued that revolutions were driven by deeds, not words. He proposed that, every time class conflict erupted, revolutionary socialists were obliged to extend their support to the workers' movement. Among the people convinced by Malatesta's arguments was the French anarchist Paul Brousse, who became a leading proponent of propaganda of the deed, causing conflict between him and the moderate James Guillaume. Brousse called for workers to seize the means of production, peasants to occupy agricultural land, and for people to rise up in insurrection and establish a free association of producers.

Three months after the Bern Congress, Malatesta and Cafiero sought to define propaganda of the deed in the Jura Federation's Bulletin; they declared that actions which affirmed socialist principles were the most effective form of propaganda. At a subsequent national congress of Italian anarchists, held in Florence, Cafiero and Malatesta passed a resolution confirming the insurrectionary character of the Italian anarchist movement. A series of actions affirming propaganda by the deed were carried out over the subsequent years. On 18 March 1877, the sixth anniversary of the Paris Commune, Paul Brousse led a political demonstration in which he carried a red flag through the streets of Bern; he saw this as an act of propaganda of the deed, through which he aimed to raise class consciousness. In April 1877, Cafiero and Malatesta carried out another insurrection in the southern province of Benevento, hoping to incite a revolution through propaganda by the deed. After putting two small villages under an armed occupation, they burned tax registers and proclaimed the overthrow of the Kingdom of Italy. Despite being welcomed by local peasants, they did not receive their active support, so the insurrection was quickly suppressed. Cafiero and Malatesta were driven into exile, the Anti-authoritarian International was banned in Italy and its former members turned to acts of terrorism; in 1878, the new King Umberto I survived a stabbing by an Italian anarchist.

=== International debates ===
During the late 1870s, debates over propaganda of the deed intensified. These discussions sought to analyse the relationship between individual actions and wider society, as symbolic rebellious acts were intended to trigger a generalised revolution. Debates were also had over whether propaganda by the deed was supplementary to educational work or if it was intended as a replacement for the written and spoken word. In August 1877, Brousse wrote an article for the Jura Federation's Bulletin, in which he proposed that propaganda of the deed was intended to set an example, educate people and incite further action. Cafiero himself proposed that revolutionary ends justified any means. In an article published in Le Révolté in December 1880, he called for anarchists to use any means necessary to incite permanent revolution, whether it be by writing and public speaking, by violent attacks, or by voting. Cafiero's remarks in Le Révolté led to a wider debate within the anarchist movement on issues of strategy and the use of violence. At the time, propaganda by the deed was defined as any act of rebellion against the existing system, even those that were not carried out to gain support for the anarchist movement; it did not yet have the inherent implication of violence that it would later assume.

While the Italian anarchists advocated for propaganda of the deed, other anarchists, including the Russian narodnik Peter Kropotkin, continued to advocate for education. Kropotkin believed that small groups of revolutionaries should enter into larger workers' organisations, particularly trade unions, and agitate for social revolution. He was ambivalent towards revolutionary violence, rejecting Bakunin's conspiratorial methods and preferring methods of peaceful propaganda. However, he was not outright opposed to violent actions, so long as they were carried out as part of a larger revolutionary movement, had a clear purpose and were directed against a specific oppressive structure. He refused to condemn anarchists that engaged in terrorism, emphasising state terrorism as a motivating factor in all acts of individual terrorism. Although he was also personally repulsed by violence, he believed it to be necessary in some cases, so long as they were directed against economic forces and not individual targets. Kropotkin personally objected to Cafiero's definition of propaganda by the deed and preferred not to use the term.

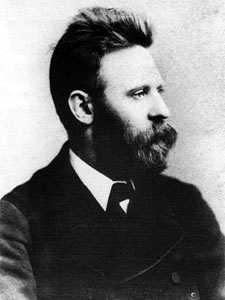
Johann Most, a prominent advocate of propaganda by the deed in the United States

By the turn of the 1880s, the French ecologist Élisée Reclus was advocating for propaganda by the deed, although he personally preferred propaganda by the word. Reclus believed that any revolt against oppression was inherently good and that the means were inherently neutral. He considered individual terrorism acceptable if it weakened the state, declaring that "all revolutionary acts are, by their very nature, essentially anarchical, whatever the power which seeks to profit from them". Meanwhile, in the United States, the German anarchist Johann Most became a fervent promoter of propaganda by the deed, which he believed could raise the class consciousness of the American working class. He toured the country giving speeches inciting revolutionary violence against Wall Street and the capitalist ruling class, during which he gained notoriety for claiming that every criminal was an anarchist. Most learned how to make bombs while working at an explosives factory and published a pamphlet detailing how to manufacture various kinds of bombs. He also believed that revolutionary ends justified any means, including assassinations against individual targets, which he considered a valid method to remove oppressive officials. Although Most himself never acted according to his own espoused doctrine, he inspired many revolutionaries to carry out propaganda by the deed. For a time he was considered the most dangerous man in America, a characterisation he delighted in, although he would distance himself from his advocacy of violence after the Haymarket affair.

== Later debates ==
State repression (including the infamous 1894 French lois scélérates) of the anarchist and labor movements following the few successful bombings and assassinations may have contributed to the abandonment of these kinds of tactics, although reciprocally state repression, in the first place, may have played a role in these isolated acts. The dismemberment of the French socialist movement, into many groups and, following the suppression of the 1871 Paris Commune, the execution and exile of many communards to penal colonies, favored individualist political expression and acts.

Later anarchist authors advocating "propaganda of the deed" included the German anarchist Gustav Landauer, and the Italians Errico Malatesta and Luigi Galleani. For Gustav Landauer, "propaganda of the deed" meant the creation of libertarian social forms and communities that would inspire others to transform society.

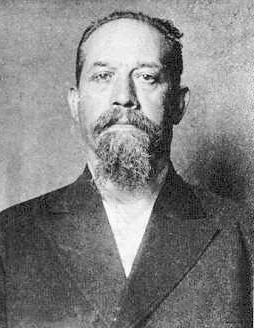
Luigi Galleani

The anarchist Luigi Galleani, perhaps the most vocal proponent of "propaganda by the deed" from the turn of the century through the end of the First World War, took undisguised pride in describing himself as a subversive, a revolutionary propagandist and advocate of the violent overthrow of established government and institutions through the use of "direct action," i.e., bombings and assassinations. Galleani heartily embraced physical violence and terrorism, not only against symbols of the government and the capitalist system, such as courthouses and factories, but also through direct assassination of "enemies of the people": capitalists, industrialists, politicians, judges, and policemen. He had a particular interest in the use of bombs, going so far as to include a formula for the explosive nitroglycerine in one of his pamphlets advertised through his monthly magazine, Cronaca Sovversiva. By all accounts, Galleani was an extremely effective speaker and advocate of his policy of violent action, attracting a number of devoted Italian-American anarchist followers who called themselves Galleanisti. Carlo Buda, the brother of Galleanist bombmaker Mario Buda, said of him, "You heard Galleani speak, and you were ready to shoot the first policeman you saw."

=== Relationship to revolution ===
Propaganda of the deed thus included stealing (in particular bank robberies – named "expropriations" or "revolutionary expropriations" to finance political activity), rioting and general strikes which aimed at creating the conditions of an insurrection or even a revolution. These acts were justified as the necessary counterpart to state repression.

As early as 1911, Leon Trotsky condemned individual acts of violence by anarchists as useful for little more than providing an excuse for state repression. "The anarchist prophets of the 'propaganda by the deed' can argue all they want about the elevating and stimulating influence of terrorist acts on the masses," he wrote in 1911, "Theoretical considerations and political experience prove otherwise." Vladimir Lenin largely agreed, viewing individual anarchist acts of terrorism as an ineffective substitute for coordinated action by disciplined cadres of the masses. Both Lenin and Trotsky acknowledged the necessity of violent rebellion and assassination to serve as a catalyst for revolution, but they distinguished between the ad hoc bombings and assassinations carried out by proponents of the propaganda of the deed and organized violence coordinated by a professional revolutionary vanguard utilized for that specific end.

== Notable actions ==
This timeline lists some significant actions that have been described as "Propaganda of the deed" since the 19th century.

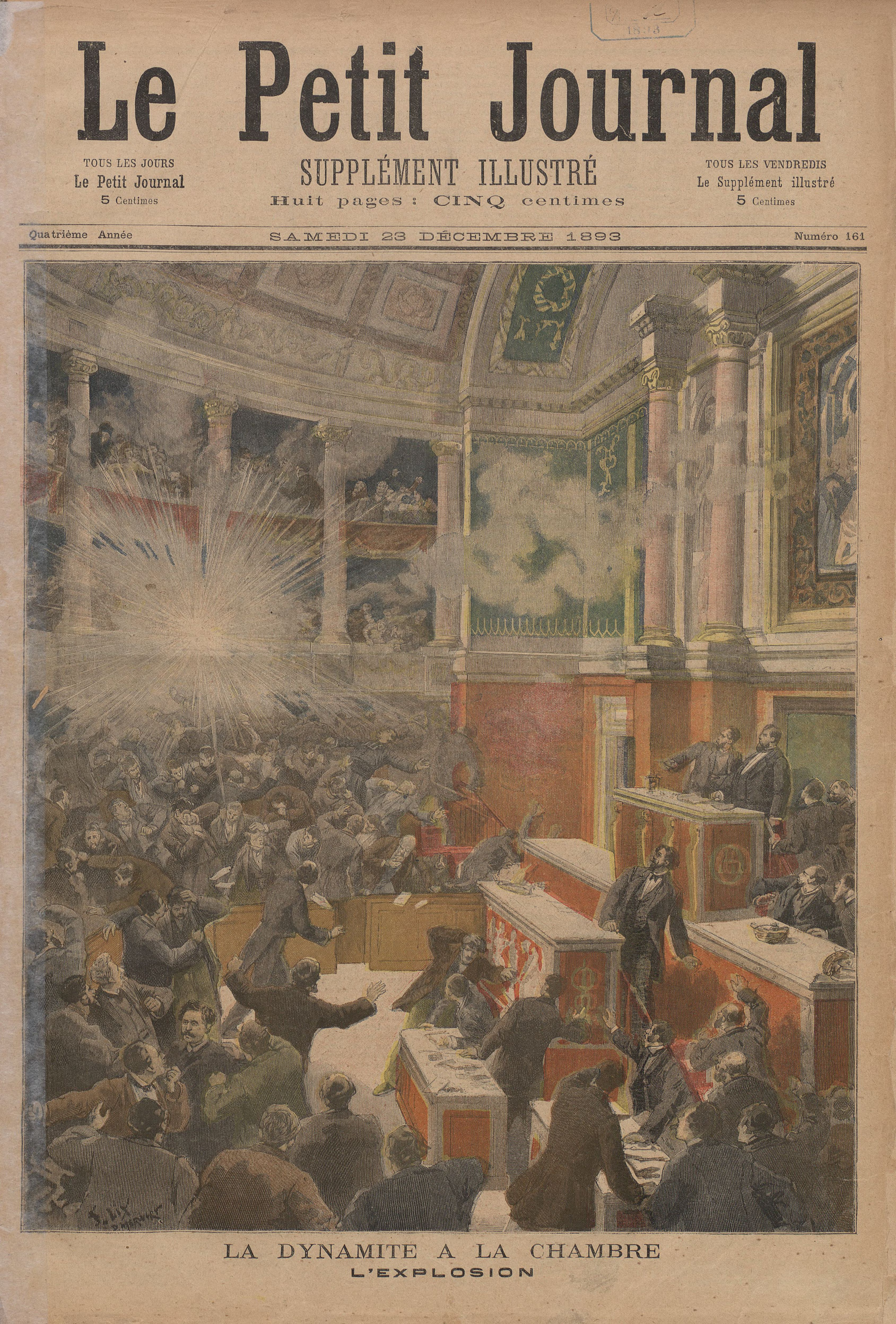
Artist's rendition of the bomb thrown by the anarchist Auguste Vaillant into the Chamber of Deputies of the French National Assembly in December 1893

- 17 February 1880 – Stepan Khalturin blew up part of the Winter Palace in an attempt to assassinate Tsar Alexander II of Russia. Although the Tsar escaped unharmed, eight soldiers were killed and 45 wounded. Referring to the 1862 invention of dynamite, historian Benedict Anderson observed that with the attack on the Winter Palace, "Nobel's invention had now arrived politically". Khalturin is hanged on the orders of Alexander's son and successor, Alexander III, in 1882, after the assassination of a police official.
- 13 March [O.S. 1 March] 1881 – Tsar Alexander II of Russia was killed in a bomb blast by Narodnaya Volya.
- 23 July 1892 – Alexander Berkman tried to kill American industrialist Henry Clay Frick in retaliation for the hiring of Pinkerton detectives to break up the Homestead strike, resulting in the deaths of seven striking members of the Amalgamated Association of Iron and Steel Workers. Although badly wounded, Frick survived, and Berkman was arrested and eventually sentenced to 22 years in prison.

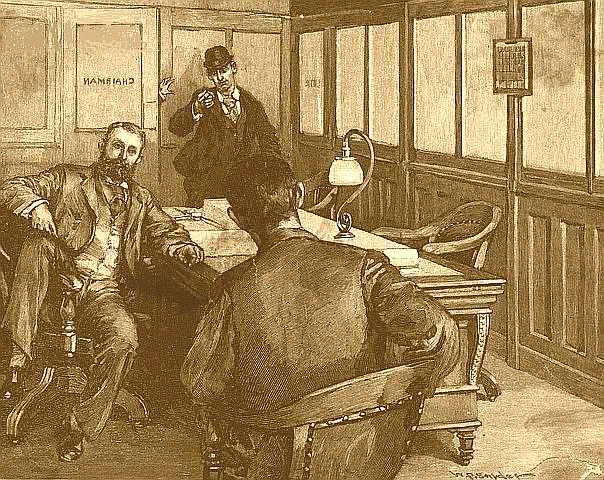
Alexander Berkman's attempt to assassinate industrialist Henry Clay Frick, as illustrated by W. P. Snyder for Harper's Weekly in 1892.

- 7 November 1893 – In the Liceu bombing, Spanish anarchist Santiago Salvador threw two Orsini bombs into the orchestra pit of the Liceu Theater in Barcelona during the second act of the opera Guillaume Tell, killing some twenty people and injuring scores of others.
- 9 December 1893 – Auguste Vaillant threw a nail bomb in the French National Assembly, injuring one. He was then sentenced to death and executed by the guillotine on 4 February 1894, shouting "Death to bourgeois society and long live anarchy!" (À mort la société bourgeoise et vive l'anarchie!). During his trial, Vaillant declared that he had not intended to kill anybody but only to injure several deputies in retaliation against the execution of the anarchist Ravachol, who was executed for four bombings.
- 12 February 1894 – Émile Henry, intending to avenge Auguste Vaillant, sets off a bomb in Café Terminus (a café near the Gare Saint-Lazare train station in Paris), killing one and injuring twenty. During his trial, when asked why he wanted to harm so many innocent people, he declares, "There is no innocent bourgeois." This act is one of the rare exceptions to the rule that propaganda of the deed targets only specific powerful individuals. Henry is convicted and executed by guillotine on 21 May.
- 15 February 1894 – A chemical explosive carried by Martial Bourdin prematurely detonates outside the Royal Observatory, Greenwich in Greenwich Park, killing him.
- 24 June 1894 – Italian anarchist Sante Geronimo Caserio, seeking revenge for Auguste Vaillant and Émile Henry, stabs Sadi Carnot, the President of France, to death. Caserio is executed by guillotine on 15 August.
- 7 June 1896 – 12 people died and 44 were injured in explosion of an Orsini bomb in the tail end of the procession in Barcelona.
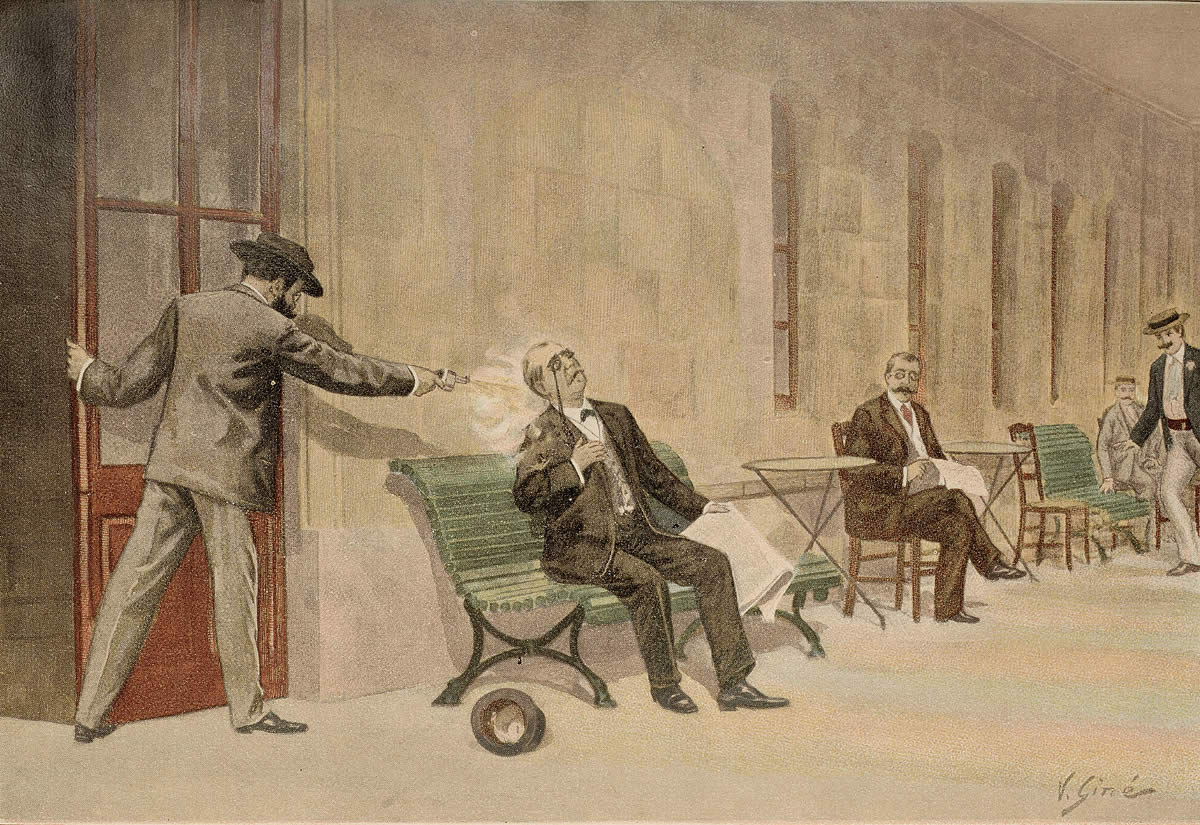
  Assassination of Spanish Prime Minister Antonio Cánovas del Castillo by Michele Angiolillo in August 1897.
- 8 August 1897 – Michele Angiolillo shoots dead Spanish Prime Minister Antonio Cánovas del Castillo at a thermal bath resort, seeking vengeance for the imprisonment and torture of alleged revolutionaries in the Montjuïc trial. Angiolillo is executed by garotte on 20 August.
- 10 September 1898 – Luigi Lucheni stabs to death Empress Elisabeth, the consort of Emperor Franz Joseph I of Austria-Hungary, with a needle file in Geneva, Switzerland. Lucheni is sentenced to life in prison and eventually commits suicide in his cell.

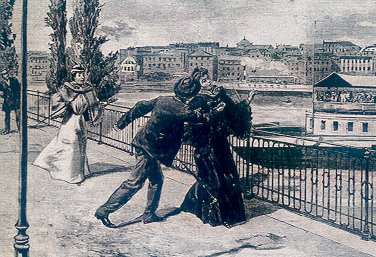
An artist's rendition of the stabbing of Empress Elisabeth of Austria by the Italian anarchist Luigi Lucheni in Geneva, 10 September 1898.

- 29 July 1900 – Gaetano Bresci shoots dead King Umberto of Italy, in revenge for the Bava Beccaris massacre in Monza. Due to the abolition of capital punishment in Italy, Bresci is sentenced to penal servitude for life on Santo Stefano Island, where he is found dead less than a year later.
- 6 September 1901 – Leon Czolgosz fatally shoots U.S. President William McKinley at point-blank range at the Pan-American Exposition in Buffalo, New York. McKinley dies on 14 September, and Czolgosz is executed by electric chair on 29 October. Czolgosz's anarchist views have been debated.

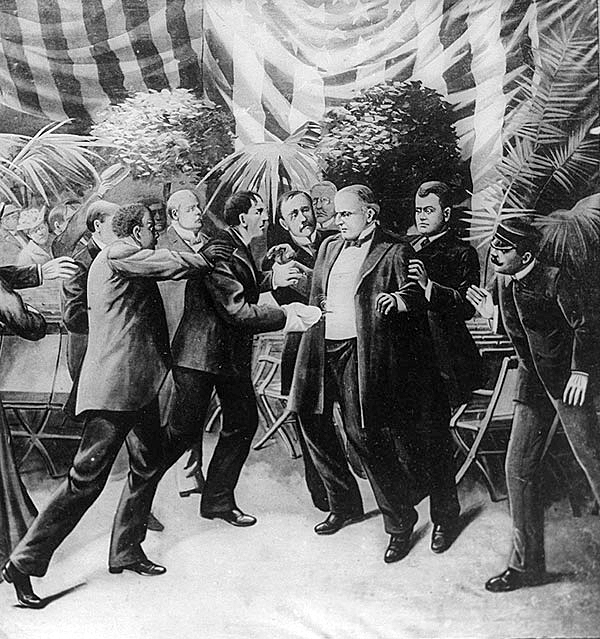
A sketch of Leon Czolgosz shooting US President McKinley in New York, 6 September 1901.

- 15 November 1902 – Gennaro Rubino attempts to murder King Leopold II of Belgium as he returns in a procession from a Requiem Mass for his recently deceased wife, Queen Marie Henriette. All three of Rubino's shots miss the monarch's carriage, and he is quickly subdued by the crowd and taken into police custody. He is sentenced to life imprisonment and dies in prison in 1918.
- 21 July 1905 – Members of the Armenian Revolutionary Federation launch an attempt on the life of Ottoman Sultan Abdul Hamid II, but the bomb missed its target, instead killing 26 people and wounded 58 others. One of the conspirators, the Armenian anarchist Christapor Mikaelian, was killed during the planning stages. The Belgian anarchist Edward Joris was also among those arrested and convicted for their part in the plot.
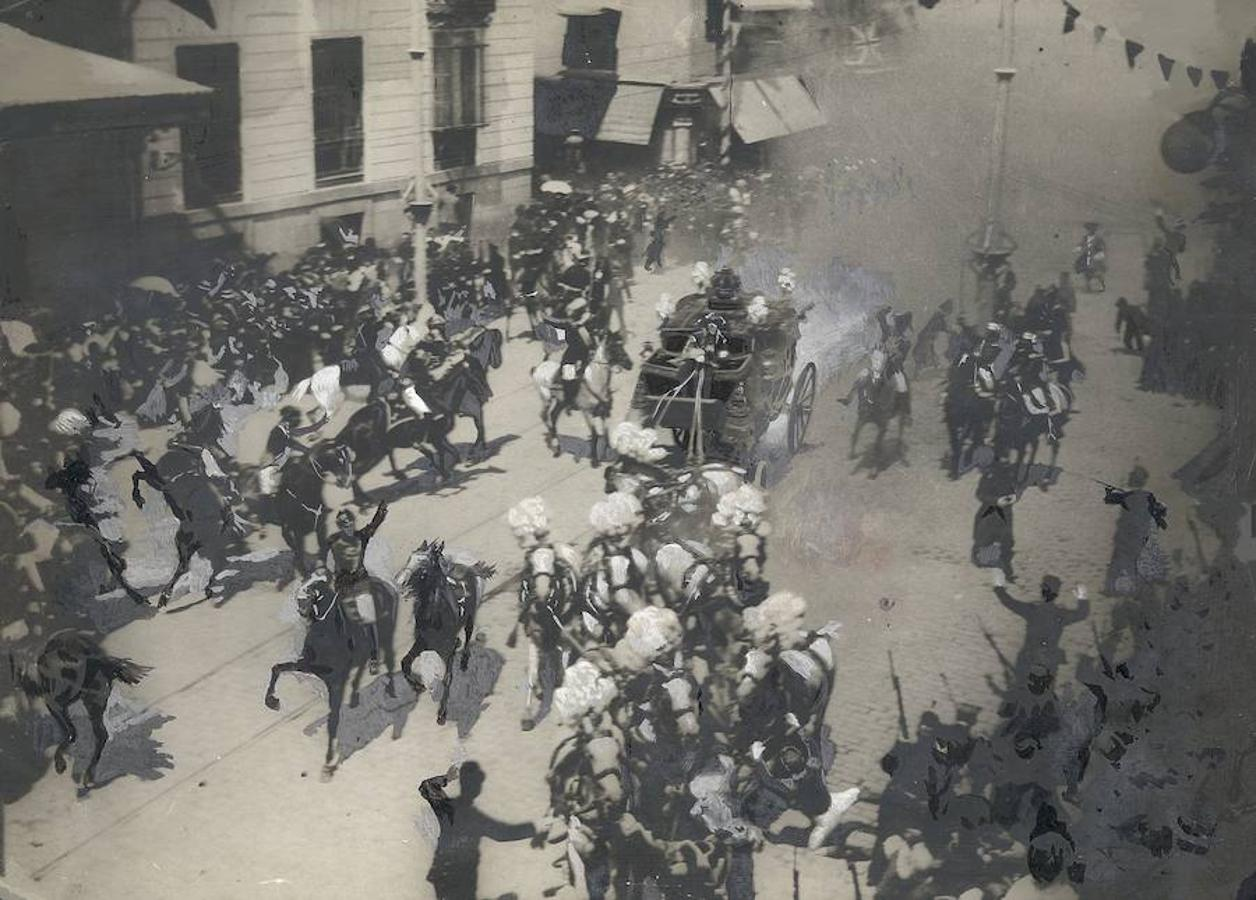
  Photograph of the attempted regicide of Alfonso XIII of Spain and Princess Victoria Eugenie of Battenberg by Catalan anarchist Mateu Morral, 31 May 1906.
- 31 May 1906 – Catalan anarchist Mateu Morral tries to kill King Alfonso XIII of Spain and Queen Victoria Eugenie immediately after their wedding by throwing a bomb into the procession. The King and Queen are unhurt, but 24 bystanders and horses are killed and over 100 persons injured. Morral is apprehended two days later and commits suicide while being transferred to prison.
- 1 February 1908 – Manuel Buíça and Alfredo Costa shoot to death King Carlos I of Portugal and his son, Crown Prince Luís Filipe, respectively, in the Lisbon Regicide. Both Buíça and Costa, who are sympathetic to a republican movement in Portugal that includes anarchist elements, are shot dead by police officers.
- 15 June 1910 – The Bosnian anarchist Bogdan Žerajić attempts to assassinate the Governor of Bosnia and Herzegovina Marijan Varešanin, but failed and subsequently committed suicide.
- 14 September 1911 – Dmitri Bogrov shoots Russian prime minister Pyotr Stolypin at the Kiev Opera House in the presence of Tsar Nicholas II and two of his daughters, Grand Duchesses Olga and Tatiana. Stolypin dies four days later, and Bogrov is hanged on 28 September.
- 12 November 1912 – Anarchist Manuel Pardiñas shoots Spanish Prime Minister José Canalejas dead in front of a Madrid bookstore. Pardiñas then immediately turns the gun on himself and commits suicide.
- 18 March 1913 – Alexandros Schinas shoots dead King George I of Greece while the monarch is on a walk near the White Tower of Thessaloniki. Schinas is captured and tortured; he commits suicide on 6 May by jumping out the window of the gendarmerie, although there is speculation that he was thrown to his death.
- 4 July 1914 – A bomb being prepared for use at John D. Rockefeller's home at Tarrytown, New York explodes prematurely, killing three anarchists, Arthur Caron, Carl Hansen and Charles Berg, and an innocent woman, Mary Chavez.
- 13 October and 14 November 1914 – Galleanists (political followers of Luigi Galleani) explode two bombs in New York City after police forcibly disperse a protest by anarchists and communists at John D. Rockefeller's home in Tarrytown.
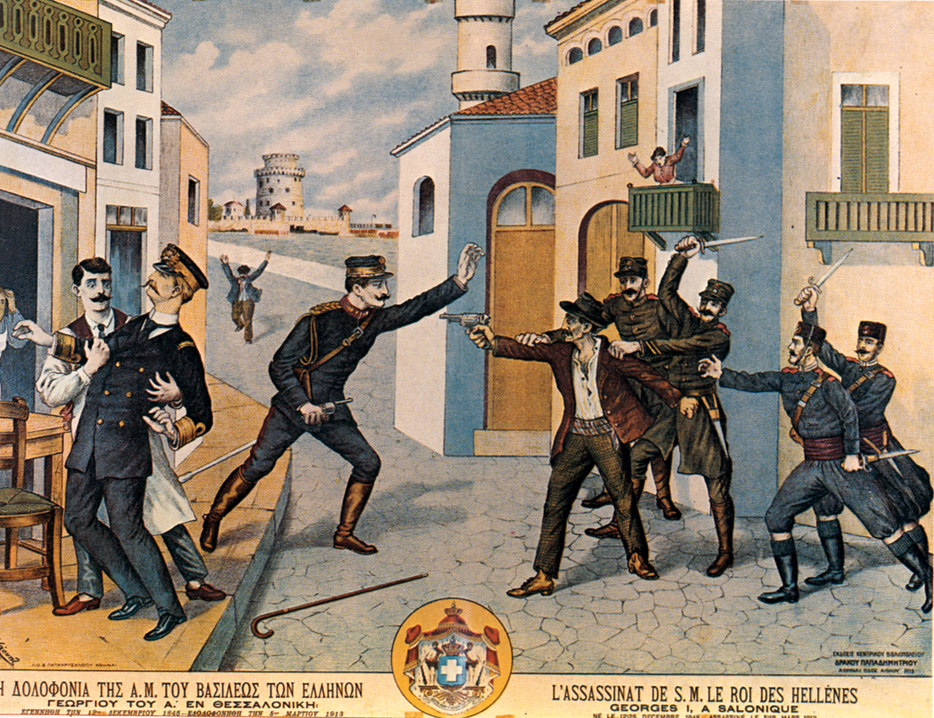
  Assassination of George I of Greece by Alexandros Schinas in 1913 as depicted in a contemporary lithograph.
- 16 September 1920 – The Wall Street bombing kills 38 and wounds 400 in the Manhattan Financial District. Galleanists are believed responsible, particularly Mario Buda, the group's principal bombmaker, although the crime remains officially unsolved.
- 27 September 1932 – A dynamite-filled package bomb left by Galleanists destroys Judge Webster Thayer's home in Worcester, Massachusetts, injuring his wife and a housekeeper. Judge Thayer had presided over the trials of Galleanists Sacco and Vanzetti.
- 4 December 2024 – Luigi Mangione shoots UnitedHealthcare CEO Brian Thompson with a silencer-equipped handgun three times in New York City, leaving behind three empty shell casings reading "Deny," "Delay," "Depose."

== See also ==
- Behavioral contagion
- Cause célèbre
- Civil disobedience
- Copycat crime
- Critical mass (sociodynamics)
- Dual power
- Era of Attacks
- Galleanisti
- Illegalism
- Incitement
- La Salute è in voi
- Left-wing terrorism
- List of assassinations
- List of terrorist incidents
- Punctuated equilibrium in social theory
- Sensationalism
- Stochastic terrorism
- V (character)

== Bibliography ==
- Anderson, Benedict (31 July 2004). "In the World-Shadow of Bismarck and Nobel". New Left Review 2519: 85–129. doi:10.64590/q8k.
- Avrich, Paul (1996a). Anarchist Voices. doi:10.1515/9780691227580. ISBN 978-0-691-22758-0.
- Avrich, Paul (1996b). Sacco and Vanzetti: The Anarchist Background. Princeton University Press. ISBN 978-0-691-02604-6.
- Bantman, Constance (2019). "The Era of Propaganda by the Deed". In Adams, Matthew S. (ed.). The Palgrave Handbook of Anarchism. pp. 371–387. doi:10.1007/978-3-319-75620-2_22. ISBN 978-3-319-75619-6.
- Billington, James (1980). Fire in the Minds of Men. Basic Books. ISBN 0-465-02405-X. LCCN 79-2750.
- Bolt, Neville (2020). "Propaganda of the Deed and Its Anarchist Origins". In Baines, Paul; O'Shaughnessy, Nicholas; Snow, Nancy (eds.). The SAGE Handbook of Propaganda. pp. 2–21. doi:10.4135/9781526477170.n2. ISBN 978-1-5264-5998-5.
- Chilton, Phil (2020). "'Propaganda by the Deed' in Theory and Practice". The Journal of Applied History. 1 (1–2): 86–98. doi:10.1163/25895893-bja10001.
- Gage, Beverly (2009). The Day Wall Street Exploded: A Story of America in its First Age of Terror. New York: Oxford University Press. ISBN 978-0-19-975928-6.
- Jensen, Richard Bach (2014). The Battle Against Anarchist Terrorism: An International History, 1878–1934. Cambridge University Press. ISBN 978-1-107-03405-1. OCLC 936070232.
- Marshall, Peter H. (2008) [1992]. Demanding the Impossible: A History of Anarchism. London: Harper Perennial. ISBN 978-0-00-686245-1. OCLC 218212571.
