= Yuri Bogdanovich =

Russian revolutionary and Narodnik

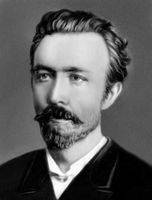
Jurij Bogdanovic

Yuri Nikolayevich Bogdanovich (Russian: Ю́рий Никола́евич Богдано́вич) (1849–1888) was a Russian revolutionary and Narodnik. His cadre name was Kobozev (Russian: Кобозев)

== Revolutionary beginnings ==
Bogdanovich was born on April 1, 1849, in Nikolskoye, in Toropetsky Uyezd, Pskov Governorate, into a noble family.

In 1869 Bogdanovich began work as county surveyor in the Velikiye Luki county of Pskov province. In 1871 he entered the St. Petersburg Medical-Surgical Academy but left in 1873 without being graduated, to concentrate on political activities. He began, with Vera Figner, to agitate among the peasants in the Volsky Uyezd of Saratov province.

In 1876 Bogdanovich joined the new Land and Liberty organization. On December 6, 1876, he participated in the "Kazan demonstration" in St. Petersburg.

== Narodnik ==
In 1879, Land and Liberty split into two factions. One faction (the "villagers") supported continued agitation and propaganda in the countryside, the other faction (the "politicals") supported adopting more direct methods: terrorism. Bogdanovich supported the latter position and when Land and Liberty broke in two, he joined the resulting splinter organization, the People's Will (Narodnaya Volya).

In 1880 Bogdanovich became a member of the executive committee of the People's Will and was an active participant in organizing the assassination of Tsar Alexander II on March 1, 1881.

Under his nom de révolution of Kobozeva, Bogdanovich had opened a cheese shop on Malaya Sadovaya Street in St. Petersburg, from which a tunnel was dug to the middle of the street for laying mines. On the day before the assassination (February 28) the shop was raided, but the tunnel was not discovered. The tunnel was not used in the March 1 assassination and Bogdanovich escaped the ensuing dragnet.

Bogdanovich worked to help recover the People's Will from its ideological and organizational crisis that followed the assassination. He was active in the Red Cross of the People's Will, a prisoner relief organization, and helped organize escapes as well as legal appeals for the release of prisoners.

In 1881, Bogdanovich went to Siberia to prepare the Krasnoyarsk - Kazan section of the route for escaping prisoners and exiles. For a while he was hidden by Nadezhda Golovina while preparing the escape of Sophia Bardeen.

== Arrest, trial, and death ==
On May 15, 1882, Bogdanovich was arrested in Moscow and tried on charges of co-sponsoring the People's Will, conspiracy to commit terrorist acts, operating a bomb factory, and other charges. After a trial lasting from March 28 to April 3 he was sentenced to death.

On May 28 the sentence was commuted to life imprisonment, and Bogdanovich died in Shlisselburg Fortress of tuberculosis on July 18, 1888.

== Sources ==
  - Прибылев А. Процесс 17 народовольцев. — «Былое», № 10, 1906. (in Russian)
