= Orlovsky District, Kirov Oblast =

Orlovsky District Орловский район (Russian)
- District
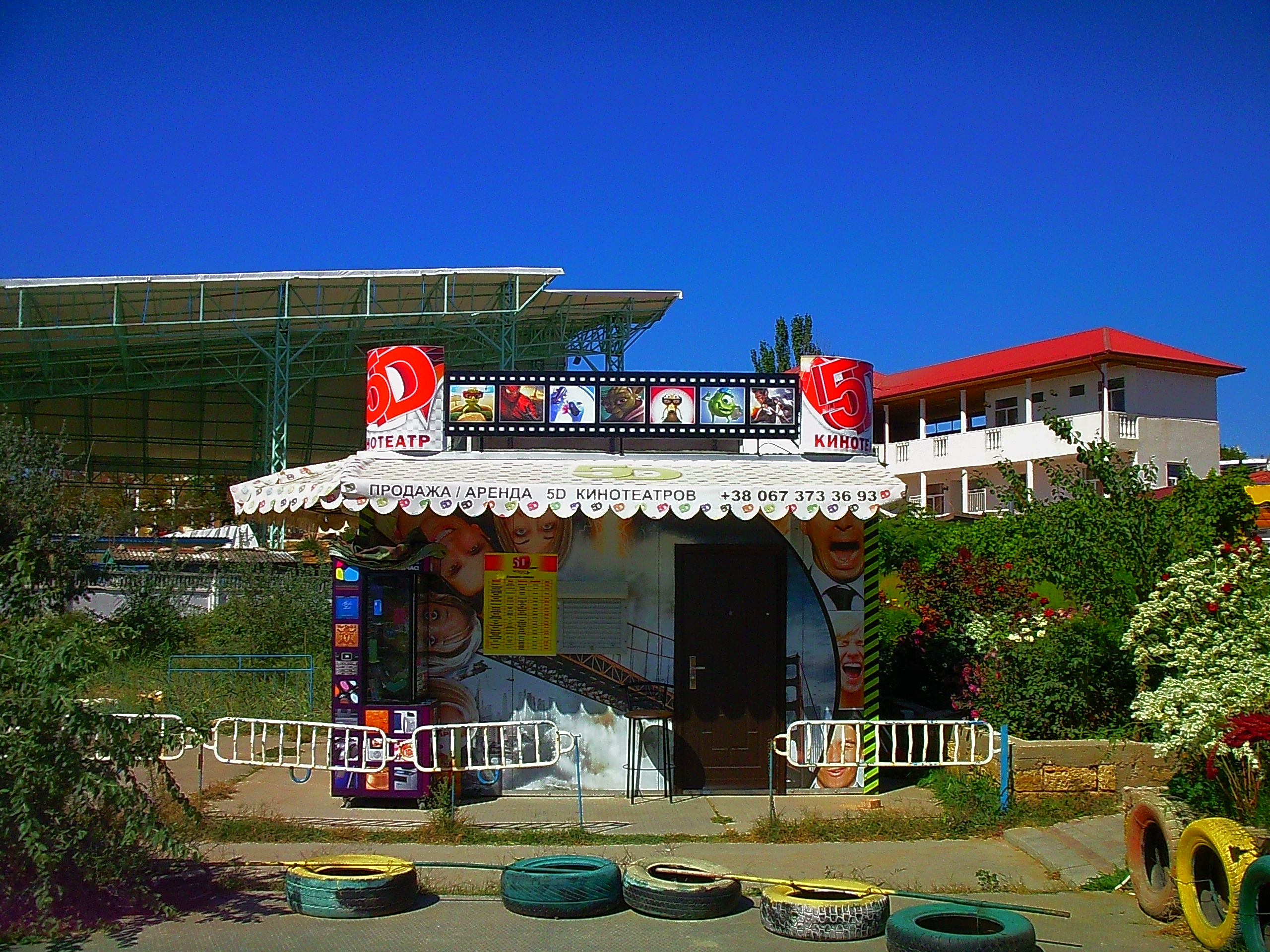
- Orlovsky District

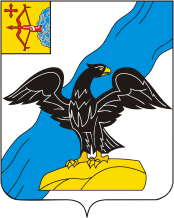
- Coat of arms
- Location of Orlovsky District in Kirov Oblast
- Coordinates: 58°32′N 48°53′E
- Country: Russia
- Federal subject: Kirov Oblast
- Established: 10 June 1929
- Administrative center: Orlov

Area <
  - Total: 1,989 km^{2} (768 sq mi)

Population (2010 Census)
  - Total: 12,934
  - Density: 6.503/km^{2} (16.84/sq mi)
  - Urban: 53.8%
  - Rural: 46.2%

Administrative structure
  - Administrative divisions: 1 Towns, 1 Rural okrugs
  - Inhabited localities: 1 cities/towns, 164 rural localities

Municipal structure
  - Municipally incorporated as: Orlovsky Municipal District
  - Municipal divisions: 1 urban settlements, 1 rural settlements
- Time zone: UTC+3 (MSK)
- OKTMO ID: 33645000
- Website: http://admorlov.ru/

Orlovsky District (Russian: Орло́вский райо́н) is an administrative and municipal district (raion), one of the thirty-nine in Kirov Oblast, Russia. It is located in the central part of the oblast. The area of the district is 1,989 square kilometers (768 sq mi). Its administrative center is the town of Orlov. Population: 12,934 (2010 census); 16,190 (2002 Census); 19,557 (1989 Soviet census). The population of Orlov accounts for 53.8% of the district's total population.

== History ==
Until 1992, the district was called Khalturinsky (Халтуринский).

== People ==
- Stepan Khalturin (1857-1882)
