= Yekaterina Peshkova =

Soviet activist (1876–1965)

- Екатери́на Па́вловна Пешко́ва
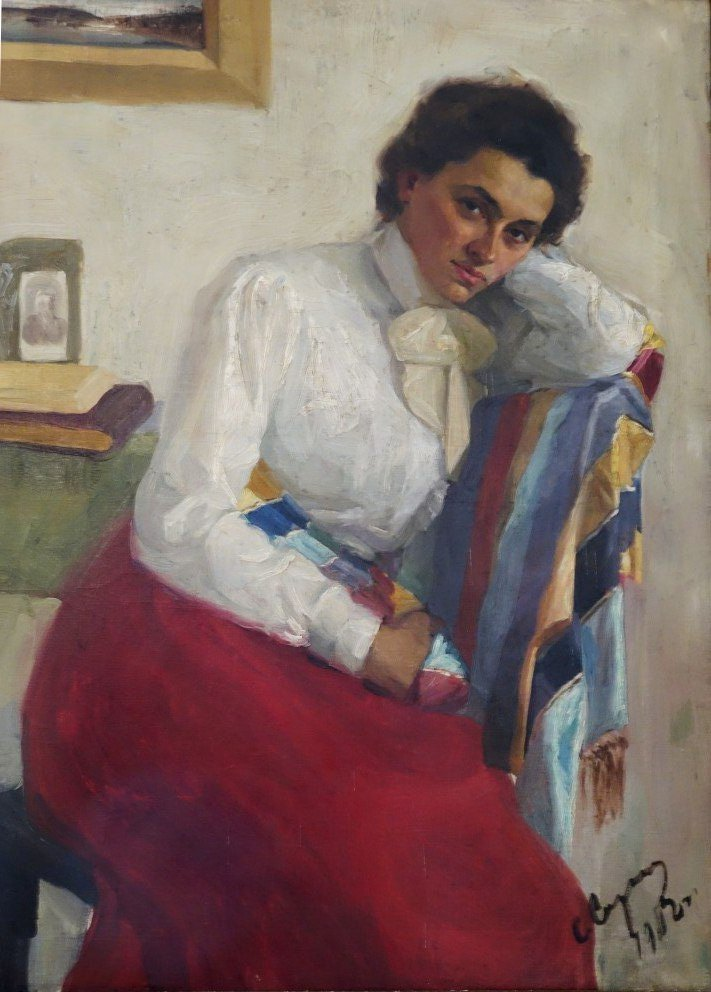
- Portrait by Savely Sorine, 1902, oils; Gorky Museum, Moscow
- Born: Yekaterina Pavlovna Volzhina; 26 July 1876; Sumy, Russian Empire
- Died: 26 March 1965 (aged 88); Moscow, Soviet Union
- Resting place: Novodevichy Cemetery, Moscow
- Occupations: Human rights activist and humanitarian
- Spouse: Maxim Gorky (m. 1896; sep. 1906)
- Children: two, including Maksim Peshkov

Yekaterina Pavlovna Peshkova (née Volzhina; 26 July 1876 – 26 March 1965) was a Soviet human rights activist and humanitarian, first wife of Maxim Gorky.

== Biography ==
She was born on 14 (26) July 1876 into a noble family in the city of Sumy. There are three known versions of her birth date. She graduated from high school in Samara in 1895. In 1895, she worked as a proofreader at the Samara Newspaper, where she met Alexey Peshkov (Gorky), who was published in the publication.

On 30 August 1896 Peshkov and Yekaterina got married. In 1897, Yekaterina gave birth to a son, Maxim, and in 1901, a daughter, Katya. In 1902-1903, the family lived in Nizhny Novgorod (now the A. M. Gorky Museum-Apartment). She repeatedly visited and lived in Yalta, working at the Yalta Alexandrovskaya Gymnasium. The couple separated by mutual consent. Five-year-old daughter Katya died of meningitis in the summer of 1906, when Gorky and Maria Andreyeva were in the United States, from where Alexei Maksimovich sent his abandoned wife in Nizhny a consoling letter with a request to take care of their remaining son. However, they "maintained a special relationship throughout their lives," noted their granddaughter Marfa. According to published data, the divorce was never officially formalized, which partly explains the fact that Gorky never entered into another registered marriage.

In 1907–1914, she lived abroad with her son Maxim, mainly in Paris. She attended French courses for Russians at the Sorbonne and lectures on social sciences. She worked in the Circle for Assistance to Penal Servitude and Exile, organized by Vera Figner.

Before the October Revolution she took an active part in the work of the Committee for Assistance to Russian Political Prisoners (Комитет помощи русским политкаторжанам) under the leadership of Vera Figner. After 1914 she led the Children's Commission at the Society for Assistance to War Victims. After 1918 she was the major activist of the Moscow Committee of the Political Red Cross.

After 1922, she was chairwoman of the subsequent organization the Assistance to Political Prisoners (Pompolit, Помощь политическим заключенным, Помполит). She was honored by an order of the Polish Red Cross for her participation in the exchange of prisoners of war after the Polish–Soviet War.

In 1927, she was instrumental in securing the commutation and release of Yosef Yitzchak Schneersohn after he was accused of counter-revolutionary activities, and sentenced to death.
