= Orlov, Kirov Oblast =

Town in Kirov Oblast, Russia

Orlov Орлов
- Town
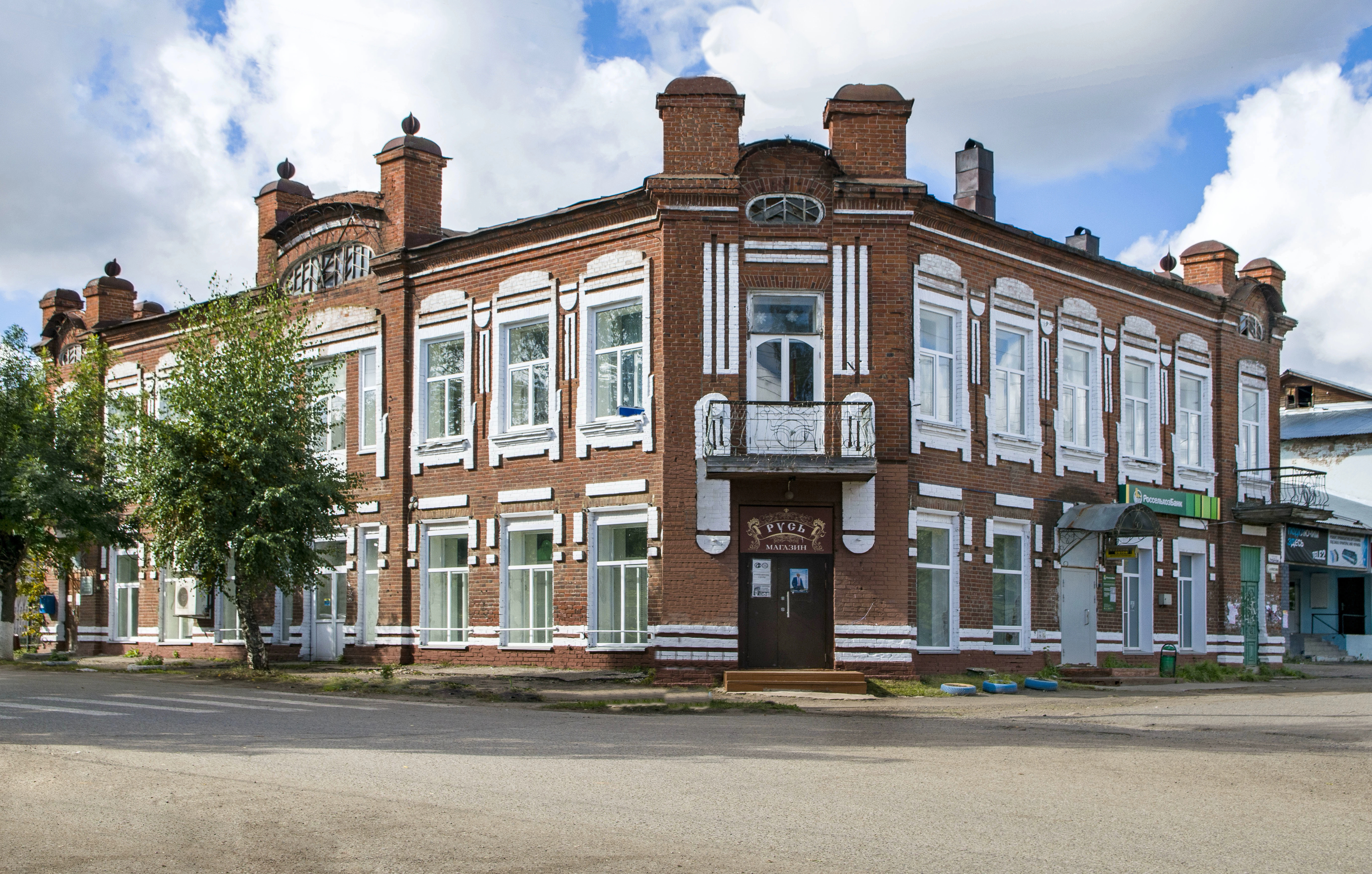

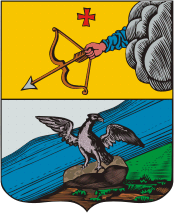
- Coat of arms
- Interactive map of Orlov
- Location of Orlov Orlov (Kirov Oblast)
- Coordinates: 58°32′N 48°54′E
- Country: Russia
- Federal subject: Kirov Oblast
- Administrative district: Orlovsky District
- TownSelsoviet: Orlov
- First mentioned: 1459
- Town status since: 1780
- Elevation: 120 m (390 ft)

Population (2010 Census)
  - Total: 6,959
  - Estimate (2021): 5,508 (−20.9%)

Administrative status
  - Capital of: Orlovsky District, Town of Orlov

Municipal status
  - Municipal district: Orlovsky Municipal District
  - Urban settlement: Orlovskoye Urban Settlement
  - Capital of: Orlovsky Municipal District, Orlovskoye Urban Settlement
- Time zone: UTC+3 (MSK)
- Postal code: 612270
- OKTMO ID: 33645101001

Orlov (Russian: Орло́в) is a town and the administrative center of Orlovsky District in Kirov Oblast, Russia, located on the right bank of the Vyatka River, 75 kilometers (47 mi) west of Kirov, the administrative center of the oblast. Population: 6,959 (2010 census); 8,596 (2002 census); 10,296 (1989 Soviet census).

== History ==
It was first mentioned in 1459. Town status was granted to it in 1780. Between 1923 and 1992 the town was known as Khalturin (Халтурин), after the Russian revolutionary Stepan Khalturin (1856–1882), who was born in a nearby village.

== Administrative and municipal status ==
Within the framework of administrative divisions, Orlov serves as the administrative center of Orlovsky District. As an administrative division, it is incorporated within Orlovsky District as the Town of Orlov. As a municipal division, the Town of Orlov is incorporated within Orlovsky Municipal District as Orlovskoye Urban Settlement.
