= Chudinovo, Vologda Oblast =

Chudinovo Чудиново
- Village
- Location within Vologda Oblast Location within Russia
- Coordinates: 59°24′53″N 37°16′40″E
- Country: Russia
- Region: Vologda Oblast
- District: Kaduysky District
- Time zone: UTC+3:00

Chudinovo (Russian: Чудиново) is a rural locality (a village) in Nikolskoye Rural Settlement, Kaduysky District, Vologda Oblast, Russia. The population was 11 as of 2002.

== Geography ==
Chudinovo is located 41 km northeast of Kaduy (the district's administrative centre) by road. Semenskaya is the nearest rural locality.
