= American Breast Cancer Foundation =

Charitable organization

The American Breast Cancer Foundation is a charitable organization focused on breast cancer prevention. Based in Columbia, Maryland, the organization provides early detection, education and screening services.

== History ==
The American Breast Cancer Foundation (ABCF) was founded in 1997. It is headquartered in Columbia, Maryland. The organization focuses on breast cancer screening access, education, and financial assistance programs.

In 2019, the ABCF partnered with Kona Gold Solutions to release a pink grapefruit drink. Proceeds from drink sales were donated to ABCF.

== Programs ==
ABCF operates a Breast Cancer Assistance Program that helps provide screenings and diagnostic testing for individuals who are uninsured or underinsured. The organization also conducts breast cancer awareness and early detection educational outreach initiatives.

== Fundraising and evaluations ==
In 2013, the Tampa Bay Times included ABCF in a report examining charitable organizations that relied heavily on professional fundraising firms. Following criticism of its telemarketing practices, ABCF claimed that it terminated the use of professional telemarketing firms and had subsequently shifted toward event-based and direct donation fundraising models.

Since restructuring in 2010, ABCF secured funding for its programs through event fundraising, private donations, and corporate donations. Between January 2012 and March 2014, ABCF received dollars from every state in the nation, Puerto Rico, and three foreign countries.

In 2014, ABCF was awarded a Gold Level Rating by the GuideStar Exchange for its significant gains to implement a best practice model.
