= Chudinovo, Vladimir Oblast =

Chudinovo Чудиново
- Village
- Location within Vladimir Oblast Location within Russia
- Coordinates: 56°14′N 42°04′E
- Country: Russia
- Region: Vladimir Oblast
- District: Vyaznikovsky District
- Time zone: UTC+3:00

Chudinovo (Russian: Чудиново) is a rural locality (a village) in Gorod Vyazniki, Vyaznikovsky District, Vladimir Oblast, Russia. The population was 1,310 as of 2010. There are 10 streets.

== Geography ==
Chudinovo is located 7 km west of Vyazniki (the district's administrative centre) by road. Pervomaysky is the nearest rural locality.
