= Becky Edelsohn =

Latvian-American anarchist

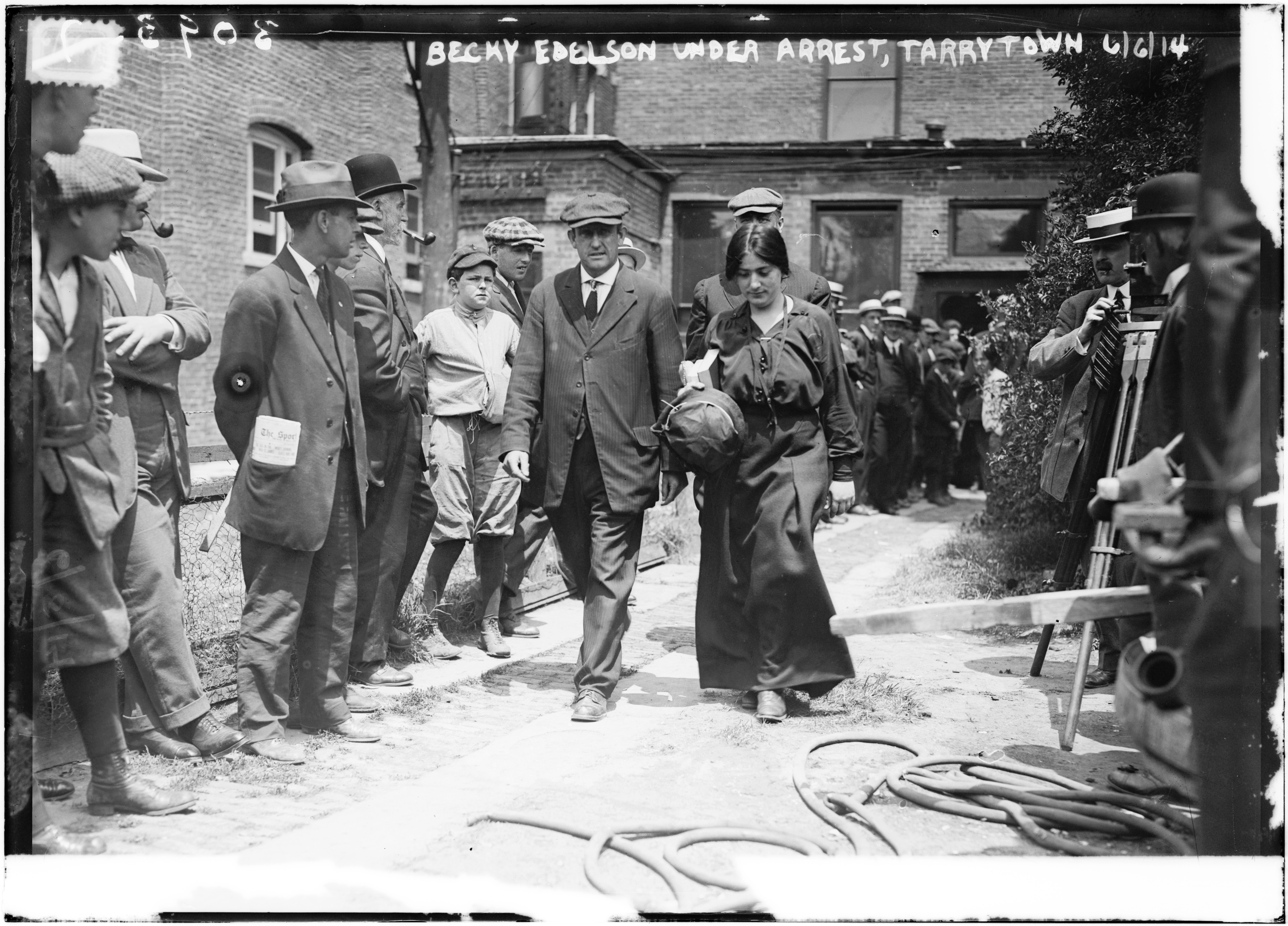
June 6, 1914, in Tarrytown, New York

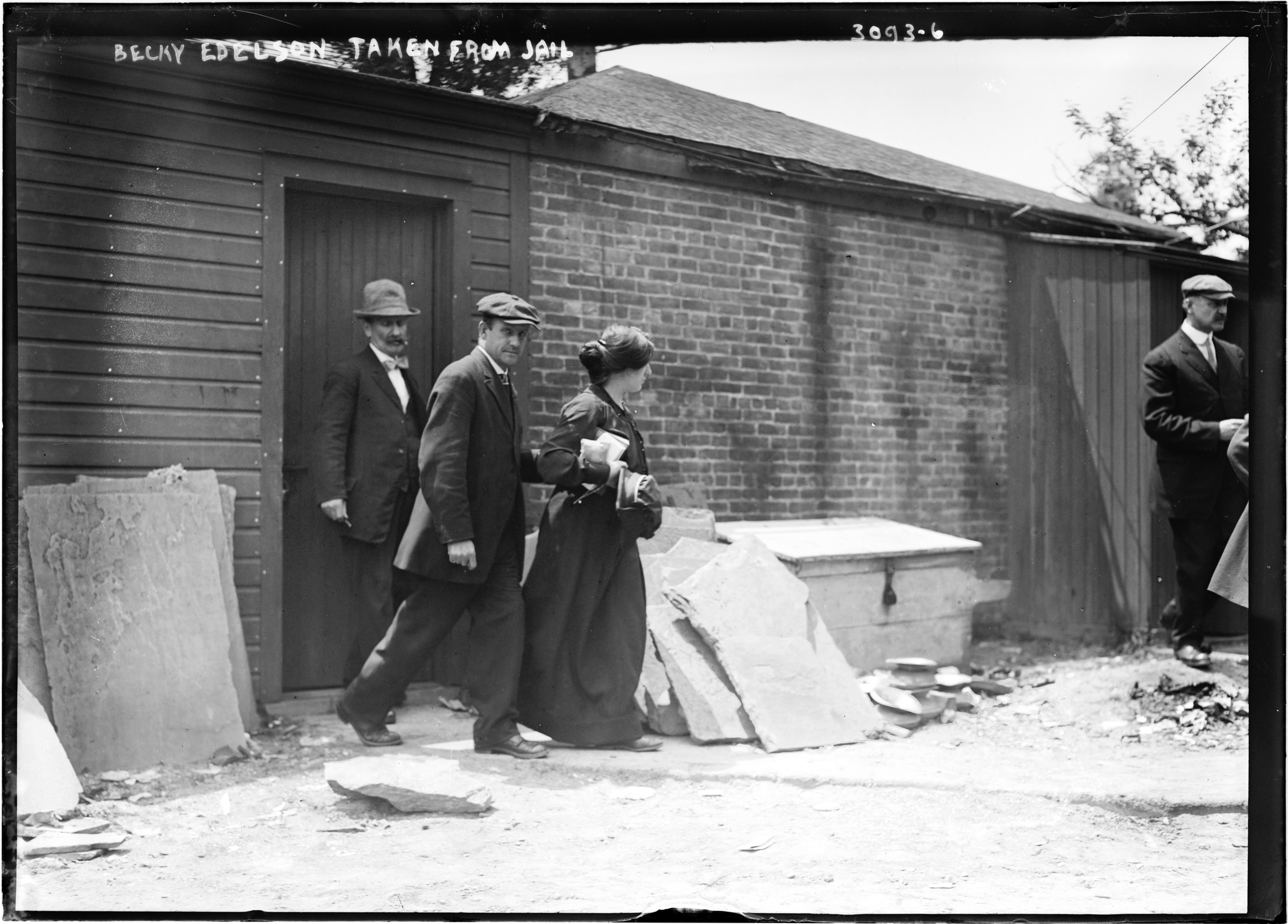
Edelsohn being taken from jail, 1914

Rebecca Edelsohn, in contemporary sources often given as Becky Edelson, (1892–1973) was a Latvian American anarchist and hunger striker who was jailed in 1914 for disorderly conduct during an Industrial Workers of the World speech. According to The New York Times, she was the first woman to attempt a hunger strike in the United States.

== Biography ==
Edelsohn was born in 1892 in Riga, Russian Empire. Her family emigrated to the United States when she was one or two years old. Later, she spent some time living in the Hebrew Orphan Asylum of New York. She was discharged from the orphanage on May 14, 1902. As a teenager, she lived in Emma Goldman's home.

In 1906, after Alexander Berkman's release from prison, Edelsohn became his close companion and, the following year, his lover. She was arrested in 1906 at a meeting to discuss Leon Czolgosz. She was arrested again at an International Brotherhood Welfare Association meeting at Cooper Union on Labor Day, 1908. She was arrested again on May 23, 1909, along with Leopold Bergman and charged with disorderly conduct.

In 1911, Ben Reitman performed an illegal abortion for her.

Following the Ludlow Massacre in 1914, Edelsohn helped to lead anti-Rockefeller demonstrations in Tarrytown, New York. On the first day of demonstrations, Edelsohn, Arthur Caron, Charles Plunkett, and other anarchists were arrested and charged with disorderly conduct after giving speeches at the public square. At her hearing, Edelsohn was specifically cited for calling John D. Rockefeller Jr. a "multi-murderer". The demonstrators rejected legal counsel and furiously pleaded their own defense, with Edelsohn at the forefront of the group. She denounced the charges as politically motivated, and scornfully dismissed the court as illegitimate: "This town is owned by John D. Rockefeller. We don't expect justice here." She was jailed at Blackwell's Island where she refused to accept any nourishment other than water. In a letter smuggled to Alexander Berkman, she wrote, "I am still sticking to my programme, having fasted over twenty-seven days. I am very weak." This letter prompted Edelsohn's friends to raise the $300 necessary to post a bond for her release.

Edelsohn married fellow anarchist Charles Plunkett after World War I. Their marriage lasted nine years. The couple had a son.

Edelsohn died of emphysema in 1973.

== Legacy ==
Maurice Hollod, an anarchist associated with Mother Earth and the New York Ferrer Center, remembered marching with Edelsohn in a 1972 interview with anarchist historian Paul Avrich:

A black flag was flying, and Becky Edelsohn was marching arm in arm with Charles Plunkett. She was a tremendously fiery person, always two steps ahead of Berkman or Goldman. She called for the immediate destruction of the capitalist system — a real propaganda-of-the-deedist! She was famous for her red stockings, which she was wearing that day. We marched up Fifth Avenue from Union Square to 107th Street. At Fifty-Ninth Street a black limousine was crossing and stopped momentarily for the crowd. Becky opened the door and spat in the face of the plutocrats.
