= Political Red Cross =

Political Red Cross was the name borne by several organizations that provided aid to political prisoners in the Russian Empire and later in Soviet Russia and the Soviet Union.

The first organization using this name was founded in St. Petersburg in 1870 by L. I. Kornilova, Serdyukov, L. V. Sinegubov, and Vera Figner, and aided arrested Narodniki.

In 1881 the Red Cross Society of the People's Will was founded by Yuri Bogdanovich of the People's Will movement.

In the late 1890s the Society for Political Exiles and Prisoners was active in St. Petersburg. The society received funding for its activities from charity concerts, literary readings, fundraising events, and voluntary donations from the intelligentsia.

After the defeat of the 1905 Russian Revolution, assistance to prisoners was offered through a political prisoner's bureau of the St. Petersburg organization of the Political Red Cross, chaired by T. A. Bogdanovich with E. Benoit as treasurer. The Prisoner's Commission was composed of prisoners, deportees, and their families, who also organized escapes.

One of the most active organization in the 1910s was a group assisting political prisoners held in the Shlisselburg Fortress, directed by M. L. Lihtenshtadt, A. A. Aristov, A. Y. Brushteyn, E. V. Pozner, and others.

After the February Revolution, the Political Red Cross aided in the release and repatriation of prisoners and political exiles and created the Society for Released Politicals.

In 1918 the Moscow Committee of the Political Red Cross was created by Nikolai Muravyov, Catherine Peshkova, and M. L. Vinaver. This organization was legitimized by I. Steinberg, People's Commissar of Justice of the Russian Soviet Republic. After 1922 the organization was named Political Prisoner's Relief (with shortened versions of this name in common use - «Помполит», «Политпомощь»: "Pompolit", "Politpomosch"). This organization aided relatives of those arrested by making inquiries about where the prisoners were held, providing them with material assistance, and petitioning the authorities for their release. The organization was located on Kuznetsky Most Street near the OGPU headquarters.

The Leningrad section of the Political Red Cross existed until 1937, when V. P. Gartman was arrested and shot and the section ceased to exist.

Formally the Political Red Cross continued to exist until 15 July 1938.

== See also ==
- Solzhenitsyn Aid Fund
- Anarchist Black Cross
