= Arthur Caron =

French-Canadian anarchist (1883–1914)

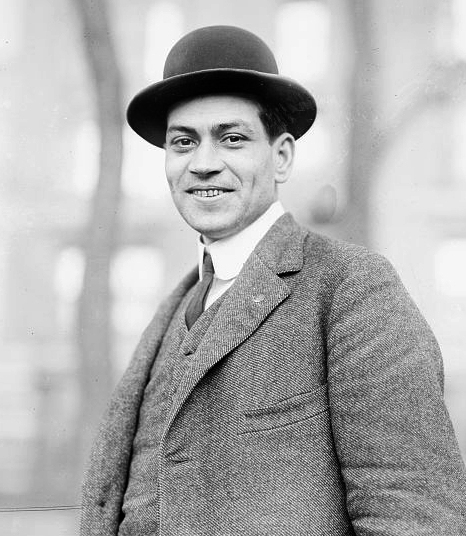
Arthur Caron c. 1914

Arthur Caron (December 16, 1883 – July 4, 1914) was a French Canadian anarchist and a member of the Industrial Workers of the World. He masterminded an attempt to assassinate John D. Rockefeller using a bomb constructed from dynamite. While building the device, he was killed along with Carl Hanson and Charles Berg on July 4, 1914, when his bomb prematurely exploded. The blast also killed a renter of the building who was not part of the plot and injured dozens of others. The bomb largely destroyed the top three floors of the building located at 1626 Lexington Avenue, New York City, New York. In the wake of Caron's death, some 5,000 mourners gathered in New York's Union Square, where anarchist leaders Alexander Berkman and Becky Edelsohn among others spoke in memory of those who died.
