= Anarchist Black Cross =

Anarchist support organisation

The traditional symbol of the Anarchist Black Cross

The Anarchist Black Cross (ABC), formerly the Anarchist Red Cross, is an international network of anarchist organizations that supports political prisoners. The movement originated in the early twentieth century in the Russian Empire as the Anarchist Red Cross.

The group provides prisoners with political literature and also organizes material and legal support for class struggle prisoners worldwide. It commonly contrasts itself with Amnesty International, which is concerned mainly with prisoners of conscience and refuses to defend those accused of encouraging violence. The ABC openly supports those who have committed illegal activity in furtherance of revolutionary aims that anarchists accept as legitimate.

== History ==
In the early 20th century Russian Empire, dissidents including anarchists and socialists were jailed, exiled, or killed for their resistance to monarchy. Different political groups and organizations got together under the Political Red Cross umbrella to provide material support for those repressed. The Political Red Cross split when Social Democrats began filtering the group's support towards people with ideological alignment, thus creating the Anarchist Red Cross to help all social revolutionaries without regard to their political affiliation. By 1907, the Anarchist Red Cross had expanded to Russia, Europe, and the United States, particularly as Russians fled persecution, but from exile, continued to support imprisoned political dissidents. The Russian empire fell in 1917 and by releasing its political prisoners, obviated any need for the Anarchist Red Cross. But as the Bolshevik communists rose and adopted the tsar's tactics, anarchists once again returned to prisoner aid. The group later changed its name from Red to Black Cross to not invoke the international humanitarian aid organization the International Red Cross.

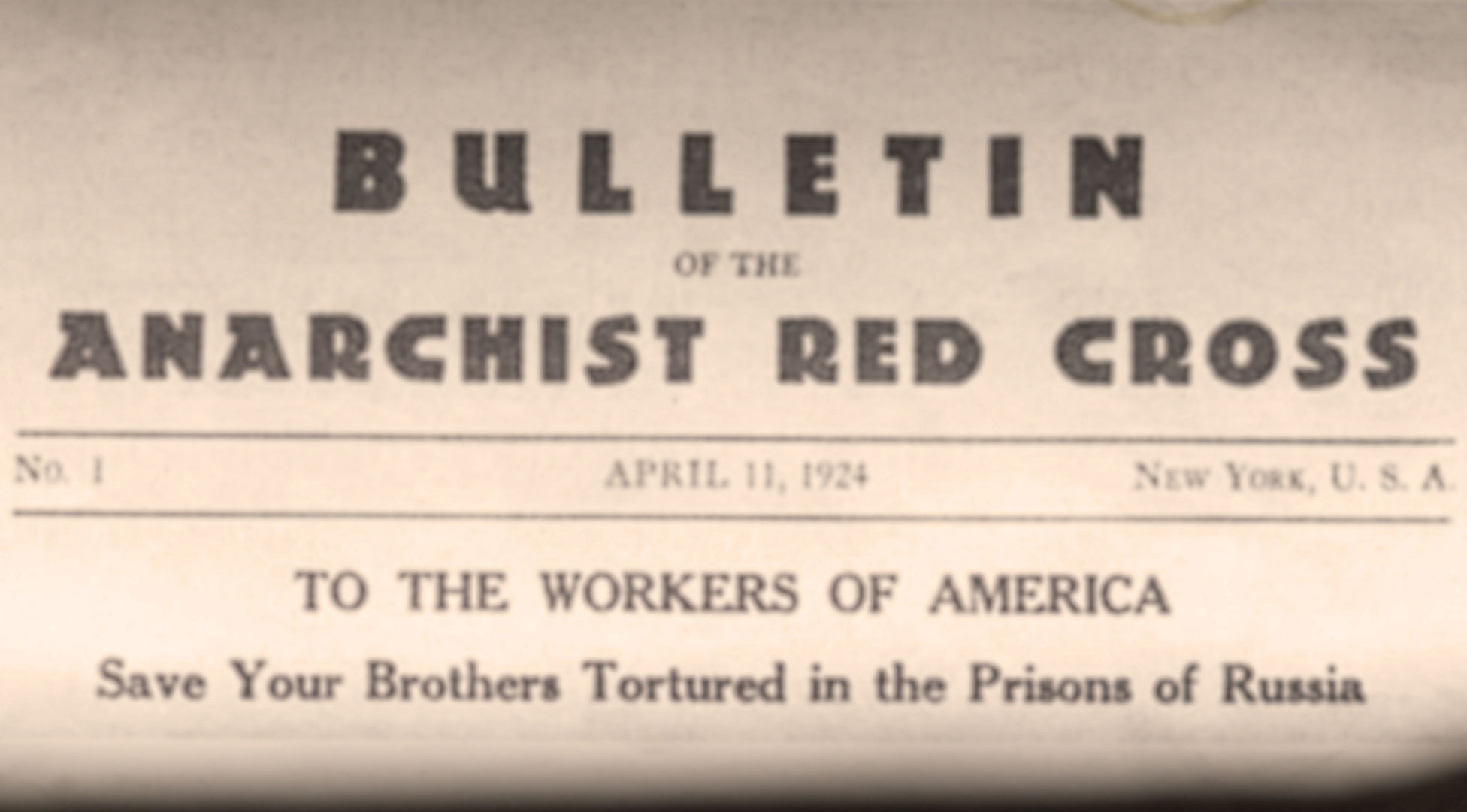
Anarchist Red Cross movement, 1924

Black Cross chapters in the early 20th century focused on helping anarchist dissidents during the Spanish Civil War, World War II, and in Francoist Spain. In the 1970s, the Black Cross turned away from international aid toward local political issues. American chapters responded to increased government crackdown on radicals following the 1960s counterculture, in which activists were entrapped and imprisoned during the Federal Bureau of Investigation's COINTELPRO program. By the early 2010s, the American Anarchist Black Cross had supported around 100 jailed anarchists .

In 1967, a British iteration of the Anarchist Black Cross formed upon Stuart Christie's return from Spanish prison. The group combined with Black Flag, which itself consisted of members of the Anarcho-Syndicalist Committee active in the 1950s and 60s. The British Anarchist Black Cross is associated with publications including Black Flag (which has been produced since around 1970), Bulletin of the Anarchist Black Cross, Mutual Aid, and Taking Liberties. Black Flag, in particular, is known for its advocacy for "class war anarchism". The Anarchist Black Cross publishing program considers itself less attached to liberalism than that of groups like Freedom Press. The Anarchist Black Cross continued its activity through at least the late 1990s.

The Black Cross's aid efforts include fundraising, acts of solidarity, and other forms of support of prisoners and their families. Fundraising events involve consciousness raising and community collaboration, and funds raised are used to buy prisoners stamps, writing implements and other basic needs. Solidarity efforts include letter-writing nights, distributing literature, and advocacy campaigns alongside hunger strikes and for clemency. These acts aim to reduce prisoner isolation and improve their living conditions.

== Revolutionary Insurgent Army of Ukraine ==
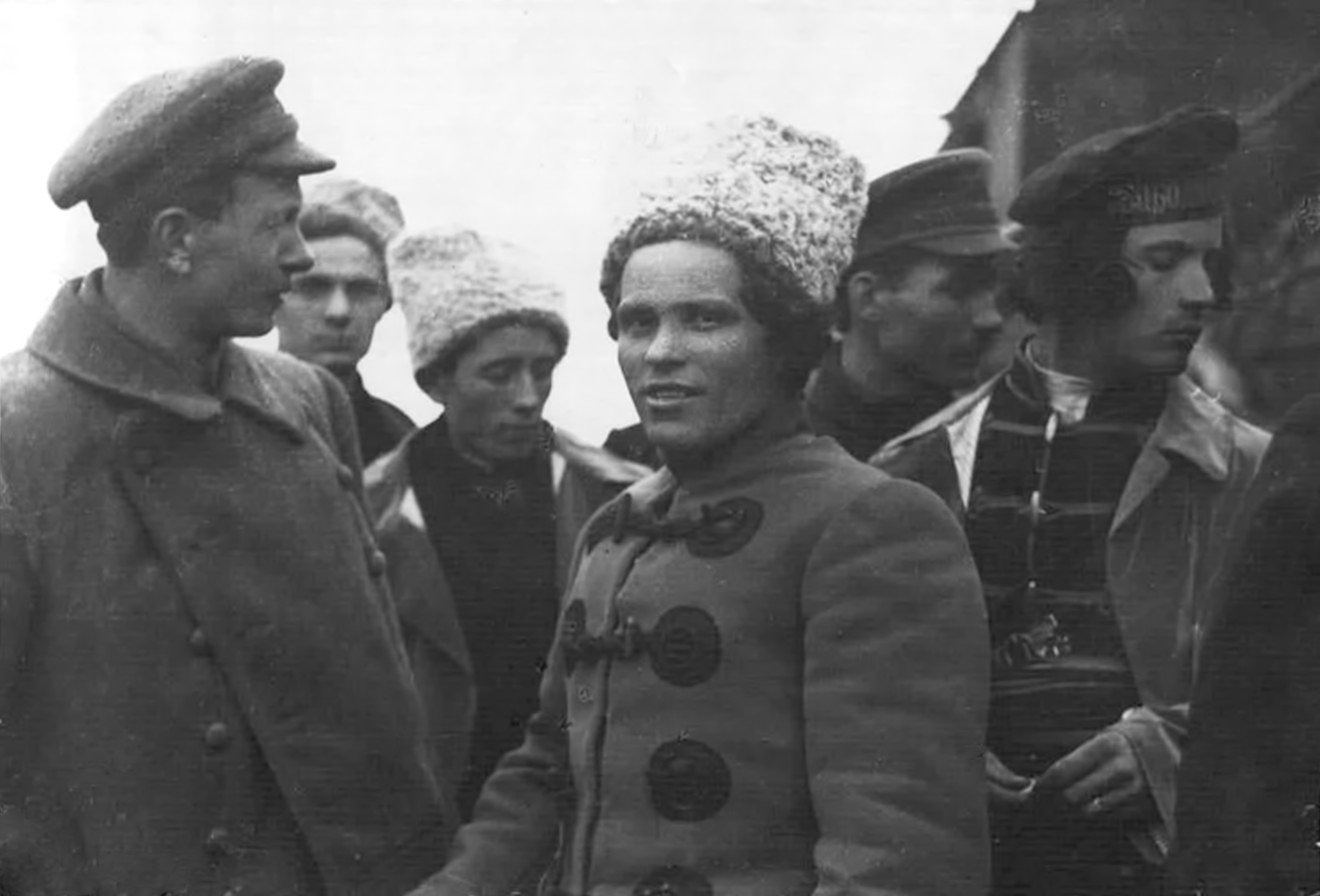
Nestor Makhno (center) and Fedir Shchus (right) in Huliaipole, in 1919

In 1918, Nestor Makhno organized new chapters of the Anarchist Black Cross as an adjunct to his anarchist Revolutionary Insurgent Army of Ukraine in the territories of Ukraine they controlled during the Ukrainian War of Independence.

In September 1919, a grenade attack at a meeting of the Moscow Committee of the Bolshevik Party was used as a pretext for mass arrests of anarchists all over Russia by Bolshevik Red Army forces and the Cheka. Anarchist militants were arrested; even the Insurgent Army and its general, Nestor Makhno, was hunted down at the orders of Leon Trotsky, determined to cleanse Russia of all anarchists with "an iron broom". It soon became clear that some kind of anarchist prisoner aid organization would have to be created once again to help anarchists held in Bolshevik prisons. In Moscow, Kharkiv, Odesa, and many smaller cities, new Anarchist Black Cross and similar organizations, such as the Society to Help Anarchist Prisoners, were formed, devoted mainly to supplying food to anarchists and other dissidents on the left. The work proved difficult, even where food was easy to obtain, as it would often be confiscated by Bolshevik Red Guards encountered on the way.

== Later years ==
The Anarchist Black Cross Federation was created in 1995.

During the 1960s, the Anarchist Black Cross was reformed in Britain by Stuart Christie and Albert Meltzer with a focus on providing aid for anarchist prisoners in Francisco Franco's Spain. The reason for this was Christie's experience of the Spanish State's jail and the importance of receiving food parcels. At that time there were no international groups acting for Spanish anarchist and Resistance prisoners. The first action of the re-activated group was to bring Miguel García García, whom Christie met in prison, out of Spain on his release. Christie went on to act as the group's International secretary, working for the release of others. The group's bulletin became a newspaper—Black Flag—strongly allied with the anarchist tradition of revolutionary class conflict.

Several small American chapters merged in 1995 to form the Anarchist Black Cross Federation and unify their tactics for supporting political prisoners. A parallel organization, the Anarchist Black Cross Network, was formed in 2001 to pursue prison issues more generally, with looser conditions for membership.

Anarchists contributed to the campaign to free Mumia Abu-Jamal, the jailed journalist and former Black Panther.

In 2009, the Belarusian section of the ABC was founded. The Anarchist Black Cross Belarus has supported more than 70 activists between 2009 and 2022, offering assistance ranging from legal fees to aid for families of the repressed. During the Russian invasion of Ukraine 2022, the ABC-Belarus declared "the most effective anti-war activity to be joining armed anarchist units in Ukraine, supporting anti-war and anarchist activities in Russia and Belarus as much as possible, and criticizing the nationalist and imperialist sentiments that divide the people living in the region. The fall of Putin and the defeat of the Russian army will lead to the liberation not only of Belarus, but also of dozens of other peoples who have been imprisoned there". Due to its position on the war in Ukraine, the ABC-Belarus was excluded from an anarchist book fair in Berlin, based on accusations from organizers that it would be "unacceptable to give space to positions calling for joining the state army during an anarchist fair".

In early 2024, Russian authorities designated the Anarchist Black Cross Federation as an "undesirable organization".

== See also ==
- Anarchist symbolism
- Louise Berger
- National Lawyers Guild
- November Coalition
- Olha Taratuta
- Prison abolition movement

== Bibliography ==
- Barberis, Peter; McHugh, John; Tyldesley, Mike (2000). "Anarchist Black Cross". Encyclopedia of British and Irish Political Organizations: Parties, Groups and Movements of the 20th Century. A&C Black. pp. 140–141. ISBN 978-0-8264-5814-8.
- Hackett, Colleen (March 2015). "Justice through defiance: political prisoner support work and infrastructures of resistance". Contemporary Justice Review. 18 (1): 68–75. doi:10.1080/10282580.2015.1005506. ISSN 1028-2580. S2CID 145373054.
