= Stepan Khalturin =

Russian revolutionary (1857–1882)

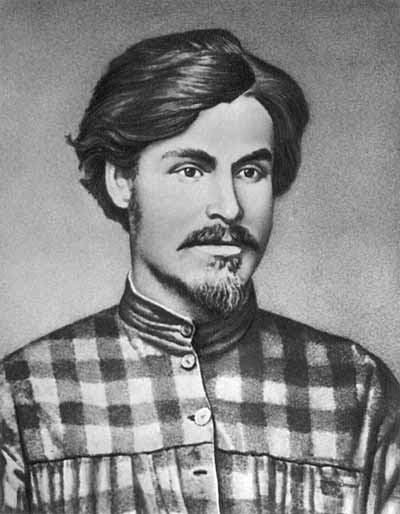
- Stepan Khalturin
- Born: 2 January 1857; Khalevinskaya, Vyatka Governorate, Russian Empire
- Died: 3 April 1882 (aged 25); Odessa, Russian Empire (present-day Ukraine)

Stepan Nikolayevich Khalturin (Russian: Степан Николаевич Халтурин; 2 January [O.S. 21 December] 1857 – 3 April [O.S. 22 March] 1882) was a Russian revolutionary, member of Narodnaya Volya, and responsible for an attempted assassination of Alexander II of Russia.

== Early life ==
Khalturin was born in 1857 in Khalevinskaya, Vyatka Governorate, Russian Empire. The son of a peasant, he became a carpenter, employed in several factories in St. Petersburg.

== Revolutionary life ==
Khalturin became involved in revolutionary politics, joining The People's Will. In 1880, he got a job as a carpenter at the Winter Palace, allowing him to sleep on the premises; this allowed him to bring in packets of dynamite each day, concealing them in his room, within his bedding.

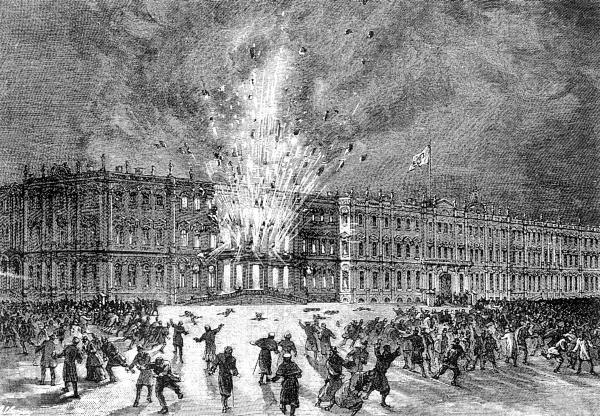
The explosion at the Winter Palace

Under the orders of the Narodnaya Volya, Khalturin constructed a mine on 17 February 1880, in the basement of the building under the dining-room. The mine was set to go off at the time which Narodnaya Volya had calculated the Tsar to be having dinner. Unfortunately for the assassins, Alexander II's guest Prince Alexander of Battenberg arrived late, delaying dinner, so the dining-room was empty. The Tsar was thus able to escape assassination unharmed, though 11 Imperial Guards were killed and 46 more people were badly injured by the explosion.

After the failed assassination, Khalturin escaped to Moscow and then to Odessa. On 18 March 1882, he participated in the assassination of police general Strelnikov who was sent to Odessa in order to eradicate the revolutionary movement. Khalturin's accomplice Zhelvakov shot Strelnikov in the head, killing him instantly. Khalturin, disguised as a cabman, was supposed to help Zhelvakov flee, but both were overpowered by the crowd and arrested. Both men gave the police fake names. Under an order by Alexander III, they were swiftly court-martialed and hanged. Khalturin was executed without being known to be the bomber of the Winter Palace.

== Memory ==
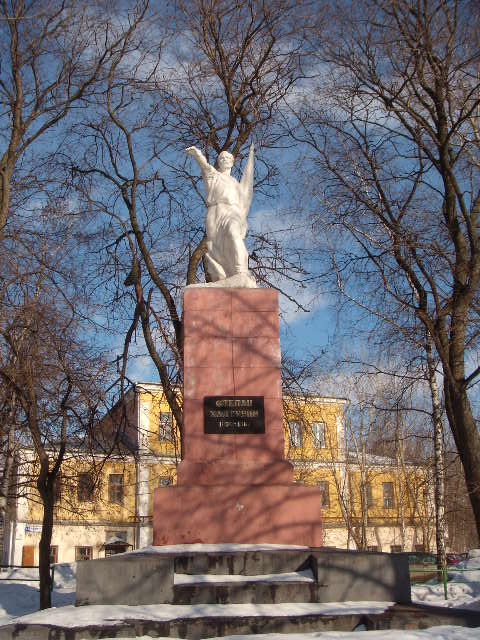
Monument of Stepan Khalturin in Kirov

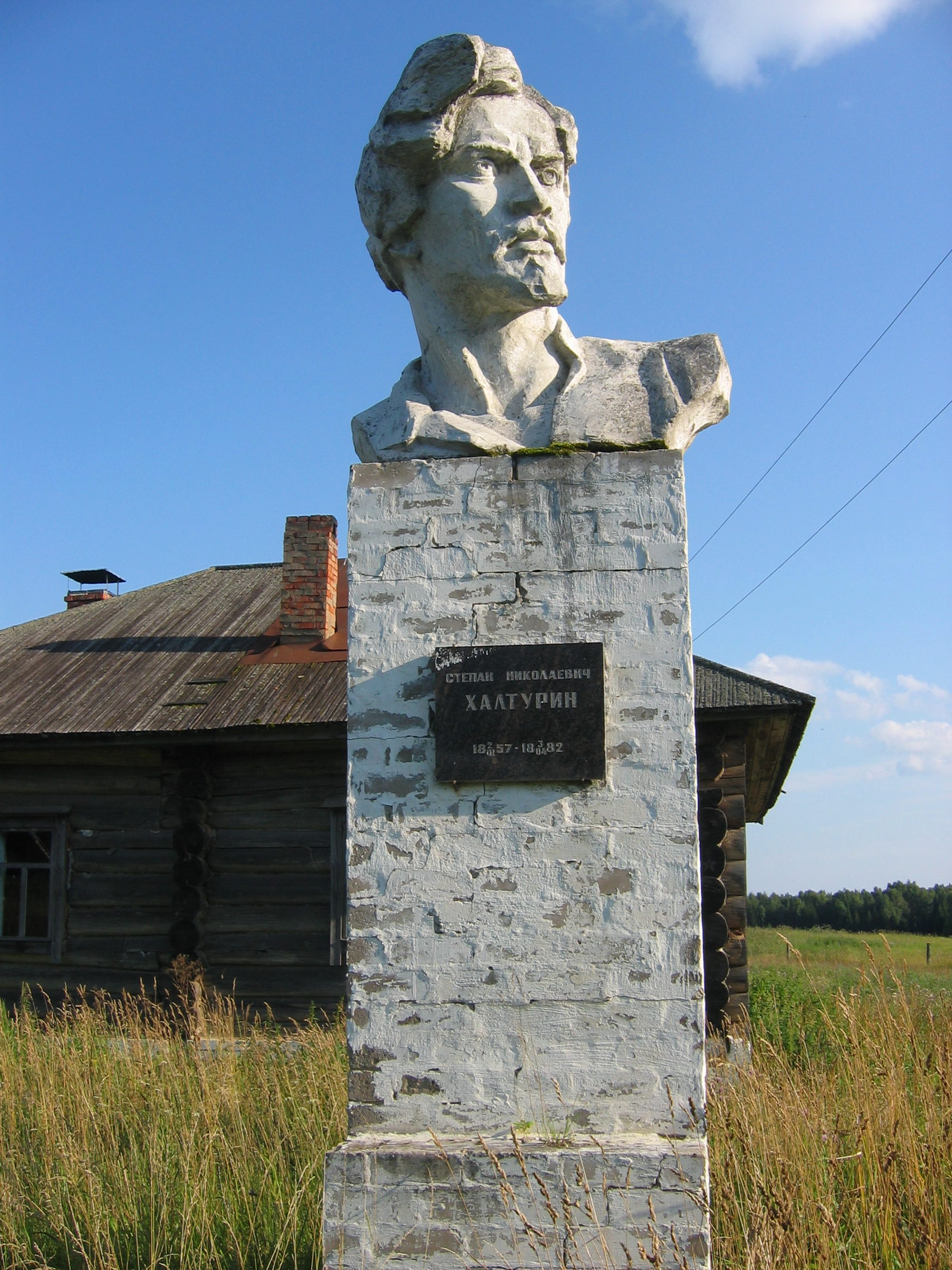
Bust of Stepan Khalturin in Kirov

Khalturin was portrayed in Soviet historiography as a hero of the Russian workers' movement. Dozens of streets and enterprises throughout Russia and other Soviet Republics were named after him, many of them still bear his name. Vladimir Lenin's office in the Kremlin was decorated with two haut-reliefs, one of Karl Marx and the other of Khalturin. Four different monuments of Khalturin were built in his birth place in the Kirov Oblast.

His biographical film Stepan Khalturin was directed by Aleksandr Ivanovsky.
