= Alexander Berkman =

Russian-American anarchist and writer (1870–1936)

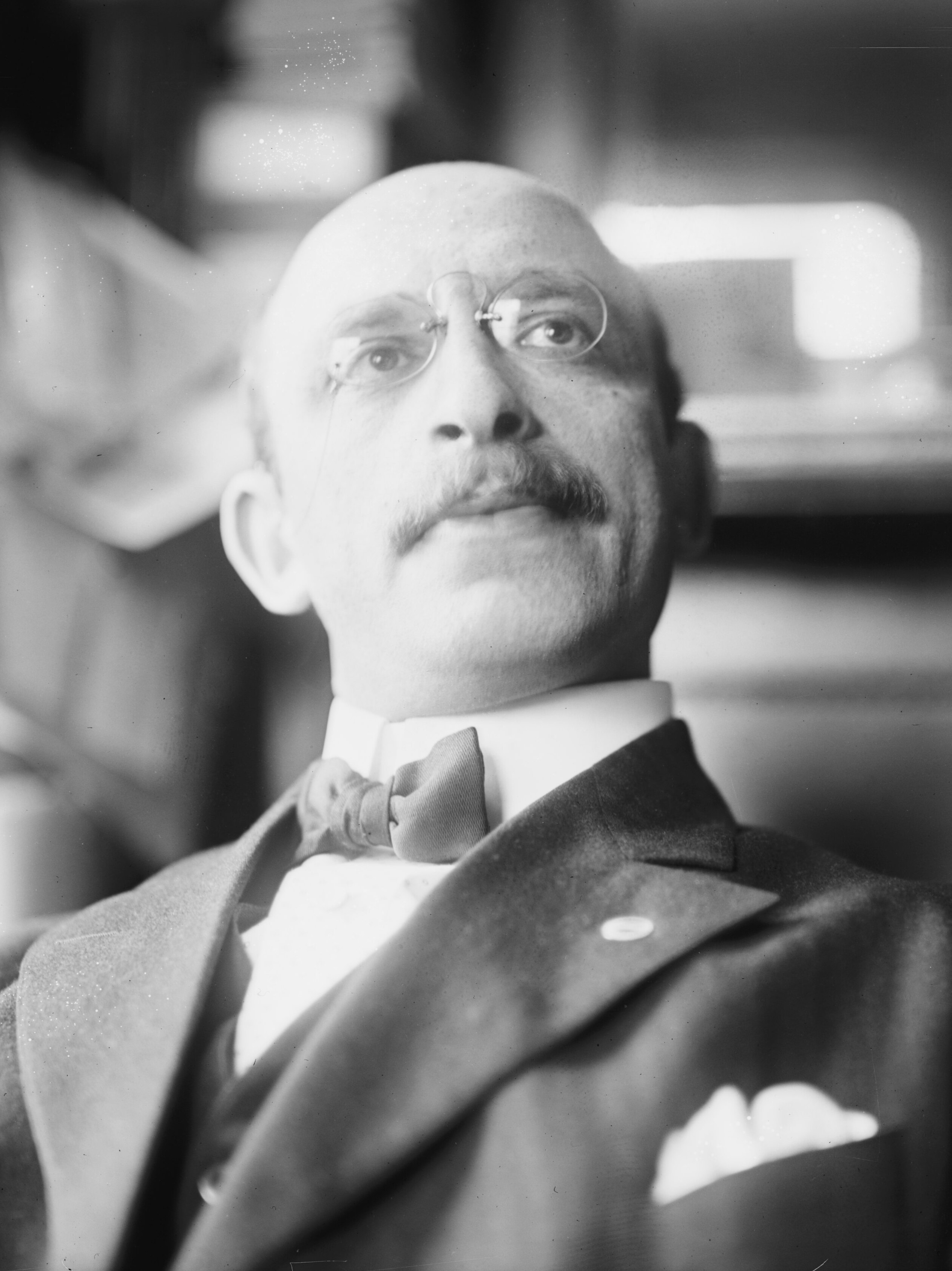
- Berkman c. 1910s
- Born: Ovsei Osipovich Berkman; November 21, 1870; Vilna, Russian Empire
- Died: June 28, 1936 (aged 65); Nice, France
- Burial place: Cochez Cemetery, Nice, France
- Occupations: Writer; anti-war and political activist
- Family: Mark Natanson (uncle)

Alexander Berkman (Note: Russian: Александр Беркман, romanized: Aleksandr Berkman.) (born Ovsei Osipovich Berkman; (Note: Russian: Овсей Осипович Беркман, romanized: Ovsey Osipovich Berkman.) November 21, 1870 – June 28, 1936) was a Russian-American anarchist and author. He was a leading member of the anarchist movement in the early 20th century, famous for both his political activism and his writing.

Berkman was born into a wealthy Jewish family in Vilna in the Russian Empire (present-day Lithuania) and emigrated to the United States in 1888. He lived in New York City, where he became involved in the anarchist movement. He was the one-time lover and lifelong friend of anarchist Emma Goldman. In 1892, undertaking an act of propaganda of the deed, Berkman made a failed attempt to assassinate businessman Henry Clay Frick during the Homestead strike, for which he served 14 years in prison. His experience in prison was the basis of his first book, Prison Memoirs of an Anarchist.

After his release from prison, Berkman served as editor of Goldman's anarchist journal, Mother Earth, and later established his own journal, The Blast. In 1917, Berkman and Goldman were sentenced to two years in jail for conspiracy against the newly instated draft. After their release from prison, they were arrested—along with hundreds of others—and deported to Russia. Initially supportive of that country's Bolshevik revolution, Berkman and Goldman soon became disillusioned, voicing their opposition to the Soviets' use of terror after seizing power and their repression of fellow revolutionaries. They left the Soviet Union in late 1921, and in 1925 Berkman published a book about his experiences, The Bolshevik Myth.

While living in France, Berkman continued his work in support of the anarchist movement, producing the classic exposition of anarchist principles Now and After: The ABC of Communist Anarchism. Suffering from ill health, Berkman took his own life in 1936.

== Life ==
=== Early years ===
Berkman was born Ovsei Osipovich Berkman in Vilna, the capital of Vilna Governorate in the Russian Empire (present-day Lithuania). He was the youngest of four children born into a well-off Lithuanian Jewish family. Berkman's father, Osip Berkman, was a successful leather merchant, and his mother, Yetta Berkman (née Natanson), came from a prosperous family.

In 1877, Osip Berkman was granted the right, as a successful businessman, to move from the Pale of Settlement to which Jews were generally restricted in the Russian Empire. The family moved to Saint Petersburg, a city previously off-limits to Jews. There, Ovsei adopted the more Russian name Alexander; he was known among family and friends as Sasha, a diminutive for Alexander. The Berkmans lived comfortably, with servants and a summer house. Berkman attended the gymnasium, where he received a classical education with the youth of Saint Petersburg's elite.

As a youth, Berkman was influenced by the growing radicalism that was spreading among workers in the Russian capital. A wave of political assassinations culminated in a bomb blast that killed Tsar Alexander II in 1881. While his parents worried—correctly, as it turned out—that the tsar's death might result in the further repression of the Jews and other minorities, Berkman became intrigued by the radical ideas of the day, including populism and nihilism. He became very upset when his favorite uncle, his mother's brother Mark Natanson, was sentenced to death for revolutionary activities.

Soon after Berkman turned 12, his father died. The business had to be sold, and the family lost the right to live in Saint Petersburg. Yetta moved the family to Kovno, where her brother Nathan lived. Berkman had shown great promise as a student at the gymnasium, but his studies began to falter as he spent his time reading novels. One of the books that interested him was Ivan Turgenev's novel Fathers and Sons (1862), with its discussion of nihilist philosophy. But what truly moved him was Nikolay Chernyshevsky's influential 1863 novel, What Is to Be Done?, and Berkman felt inspired by Rakhmetov, its puritanical protagonist who is willing to sacrifice personal pleasure and family ties in single-minded pursuit of his revolutionary aims.

Soon, Berkman joined a group at school that was reading and discussing revolutionary literature, which was prohibited under the new tsar, Alexander III. He distributed banned material to other students and wrote some radical tracts of his own, which he printed using supplies pilfered from the school. He turned in a paper titled "There Is No God", which resulted in a one-year demotion as punishment on the basis of "precocious godlessness, dangerous tendencies and subordination".

Berkman's mother died in 1887, and his uncle Nathan Natanson became responsible for him. Berkman had contempt for Natanson for his desire to maintain order and avoid conflict. Natanson could not understand what Berkman found appealing in his radical ideas, and he worried that Berkman would bring shame to the family. Late that year, Berkman was caught stealing copies of the school exams and bribing a handyman. He was expelled and labelled a "nihilist conspirator".

Berkman decided to emigrate to the United States. When his brother left for Germany in early 1888 to study medicine, Berkman took the opportunity to accompany him and from there made his way to New York City.

=== New York City ===
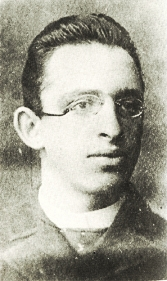
Berkman in 1892

Soon after his arrival in New York, where he knew no one and spoke no English, Berkman became an anarchist through his involvement with groups that had formed to campaign to free the men convicted of the 1886 Haymarket bombing. He joined the Pioneers of Liberty, the first Jewish anarchist group in the U.S. The group was affiliated with the International Working People's Association, the organization to which the Haymarket defendants had belonged, and they regarded the Haymarket men as martyrs. Since most of its members worked in the garment industry, the Pioneers of Liberty took part in strikes against sweatshops and helped establish some of the first Jewish labor unions in the city. Before long, Berkman was one of the prominent members of the organization.

Although he wasn't fluent in English, Berkman did speak German; he soon came under the influence of Johann Most, the best known anarchist in the United States and an advocate of propaganda of the deed—attentat, or violence carried out to encourage the masses to revolt. He became a typesetter for Most's German-language newspaper Freiheit.

In 1889, Berkman met and began a romance with Emma Goldman, another Russian immigrant. He invited her to Most's lecture. Soon Berkman and Goldman fell in love and became inseparable. Despite their disagreements and separations, Goldman and Berkman would share a mutual devotion for decades, united by their anarchist principles and love for each other.

By the end of the year, they moved into a communal apartment with Berkman's cousin, Modest Aronstam (referred to as "Fedya" in both Berkman's Prison Memoirs of an Anarchist and Goldman's Living My Life), and Goldman's friend, Helene Minkin, along principles inspired by What Is to Be Done? Living according to the example of Rakhmetov, Berkman denied himself even the smallest pleasures, and expected his comrades to do the same. Aronstam, in contrast, occasionally brought home flowers. Frictions between the two grew: "Every penny spent for ourselves was so much taken from the Cause," Berkman fumed. "Luxury is a crime, a weakness." With time, however, the two cousins reconciled.

Berkman eventually broke with Most and aligned himself with the autonomists. The autonomists, an anarchist group associated with Josef Peukert, emphasized individual freedom. They feared the domination of the anarchist movement by a single individual and opposed the establishment of anarchist organizations. Consequently, the autonomists were opposed to Most. Soon, Berkman was working for the autonomists' publications, Der Anarchist and Die Autonomie, but he remained committed to the concept of violent action as a tool for inspiring revolutionary change.

At the end of 1891, Berkman learned that Russian anarchist Peter Kropotkin, whom he admired, had canceled an American speaking tour on the basis that it was too expensive for the struggling anarchist movement. While Berkman was disappointed, the frugality of the action further elevated Kropotkin's stature in his eyes.

=== Attentat: Frick assassination attempt ===
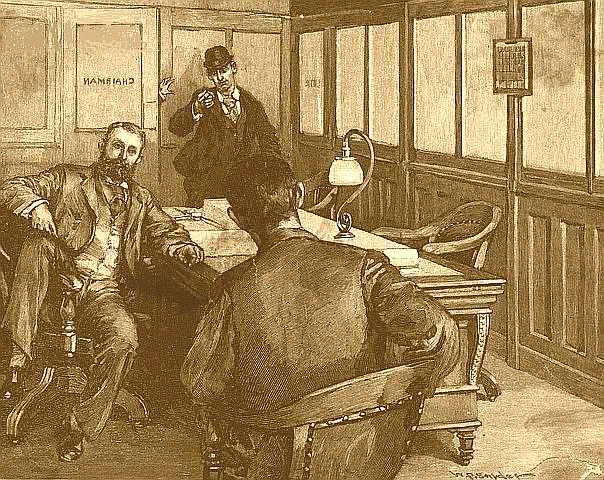
Berkman's attempt to assassinate Frick, as illustrated by W. P. Snyder for Harper's Weekly in 1892

In 1892, Berkman, Goldman, and Aronstam relocated to Worcester, Massachusetts, where they operated a successful luncheonette. At the end of June, Goldman saw a newspaper headline that brought to her attention the trio's first opportunity for political action: the Homestead Strike. In June 1892, workers at a steel plant in Homestead, Pennsylvania were locked out when negotiations between the Carnegie Steel Company and the Amalgamated Association of Iron and Steel Workers failed. Henry Clay Frick, the factory's notoriously anti-union manager, hired 300 armed guards from the Pinkerton Detective Agency to break the union's picket lines. When the Pinkerton guards arrived at the factory on the morning of July 6, a gunfight broke out. Nine union workers and seven guards were killed in the 12-hour fight.

Newspapers across the country defended the union workers, and the trio decided to assassinate Frick. They believed the assassination would arouse the working class to unite and revolt against the capitalist system. Berkman's plan was to assassinate Frick and then kill himself; Goldman was to explain Berkman's motives after his death; and Aronstam was to follow Berkman in the event that he failed in his mission. Emulating his Russian idols, Berkman tried to make a bomb, but when that failed, he went to Pittsburgh with the plan to use a handgun.

Arriving in Pittsburgh on July 14, 1892, Berkman sought out anarchists Henry Bauer and Carl Nold. They were followers of Most, but supported the Homestead strike. Berkman had never met either man but counted on their support. Nold invited Berkman to stay with him, and he and Bauer introduced Berkman to several local anarchists.

Berkman was ready to carry out the assassination on July 21. He wore a new suit and a black derby hat, and in his pockets he had a gun and a dagger fashioned from a steel file. He went to Frick's office and asked to see him, saying he was the representative of a New York hiring agency, but he was told Frick was too busy to meet him. The following night, Berkman checked into a hotel under the name Rakhmetov, his role model from What Is to Be Done? On July 23, he returned to Frick's office. While the attendant told Frick that the New York employment agent had returned to see him, Berkman burst into the office and took aim at Frick's head. After two shots, Berkman was tackled to the ground. Still, he managed to pull out the dagger and stab Frick three times.

A carpenter who was working nearby heard the commotion and hit Berkman in the head with his hammer, but the blow only stunned him. The gunshots and struggle could be heard and seen from the street, and within minutes Frick's office had attracted all sorts of people, but Berkman continued to resist. A deputy sheriff aimed his gun at Berkman, but Frick said, "Don't shoot. Leave him to the law." As the police led Berkman to the jail, an angry crowd gathered and shouted at Berkman. When he was questioned by police, Berkman said he had arrived in Pittsburgh on July 21 and that he had acted alone. A dynamite capsule was discovered in his mouth after a policeman noticed that he was chewing on something.

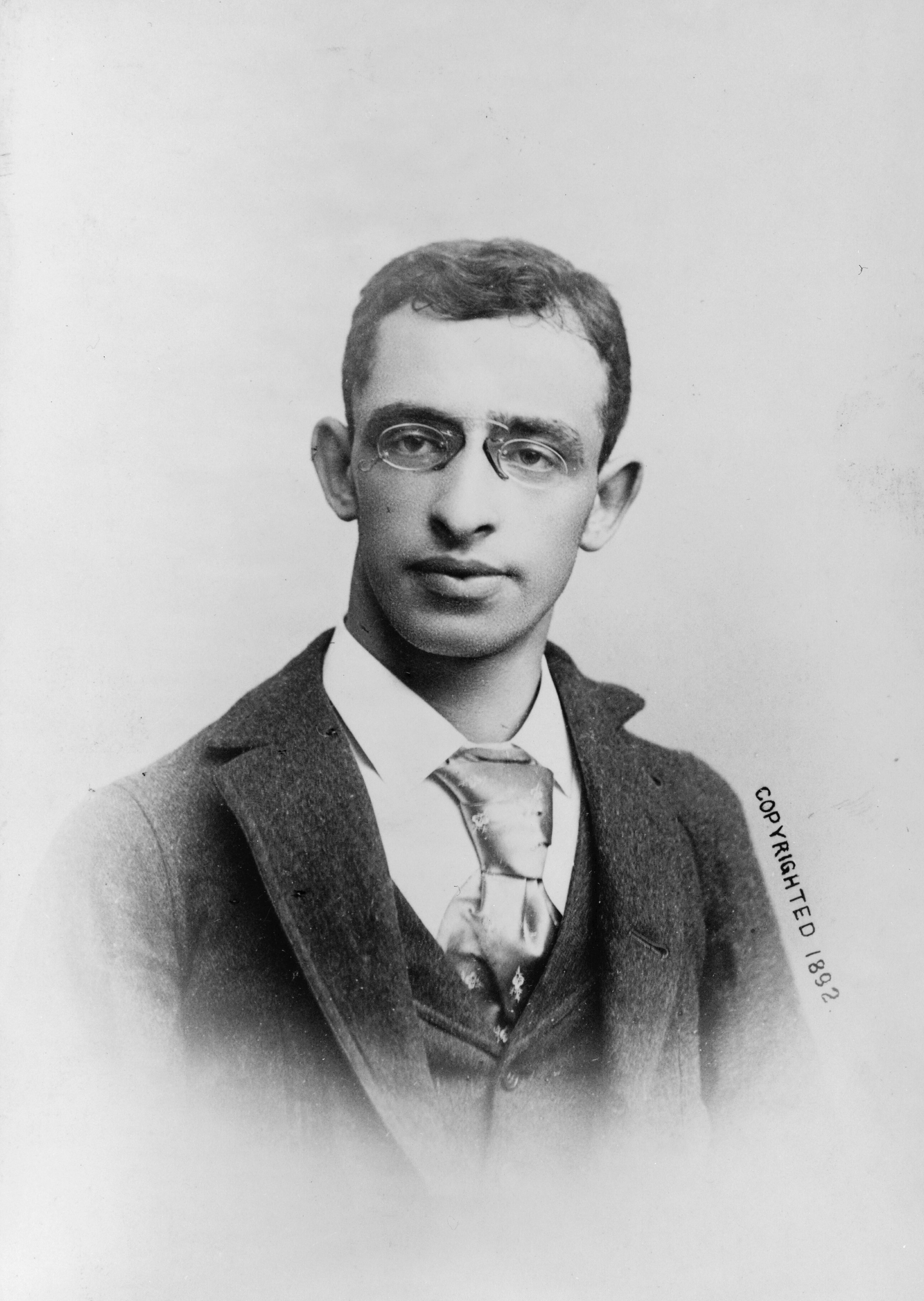
Berkman's portrait, July 24, 1892

On July 24, a police officer took Berkman for a portrait. He lent Berkman his own tie for the picture. The following day, Aronstam arrived in Pittsburgh with pockets full of dynamite to finish Berkman's botched assassination attempt. Somehow rumors of his arrival had preceded him, and he saw a newspaper headline that read "Was Not Alone. Berkmann [sic] Had Accomplices in His Mission of Murder. Is Aaron Stamm Here?" Aronstam became frightened, hid the dynamite in an outhouse, and returned to New York.

Most of the anarchists in Pittsburgh were questioned by police. Bauer and Nold were arrested and charged with complicity in Berkman's plot. Everywhere, anarchists took sides for or against Berkman and his attentat. The autonomists supported him, as did many anarchists across the country. Peukert spoke out in his defense. Also defending Berkman was Dyer Lum, an anarchist who had been a comrade of the Haymarket defendants, and Lucy Parsons. Among those who criticized Berkman were Jo Labadie, Benjamin Tucker, and many other anarchists who believed the anarchist struggle should be peaceful. Berkman's most prominent critic was Most, who belittled Berkman as a nuisance or a flunky hired by Frick himself to garner sympathy. Most published an article in his newspaper titled "Reflections on Attentats" in which he wrote that propaganda of the deed was doomed to be misunderstood in the U.S. and that it could only backfire. Most wrote that Berkman's action had proven this; while Berkman might have demonstrated a certain heroism, in all other respects his attempt was a "total failure".

Berkman was deeply interested in the debate concerning his action. He was almost heartbroken by the rebuke from Most, who had "preached propaganda by deed all his life—now he repudiates the first attentat in this country". He was encouraged by the words of Kropotkin, who wrote that "Berkman has done more to spread the anarchist idea among the masses who do not read our papers than all the writings that we may publish. He has shown that there are among the anarchists, men capable of being revolted by the crimes of capitalism to the point of giving their life to put an end to these crimes, or at least to open a way to such an end."

=== Trial ===
Berkman declined the services of a lawyer for his trial. The warden cautioned him against this choice, but Berkman replied "I don't believe in your laws. I don't acknowledge the authority of your courts. I am innocent morally". Bauer and Nold visited him with their lawyers, who offered to represent him at no charge, but Berkman politely refused. As the trial approached, Berkman drafted a speech that he would read in court. Written in German because his English was still poor, it was 40 pages long and took two hours to read. Berkman tried to learn the date of his trial, but it was kept secret by the district attorney out of fear of an attack by Berkman's comrades. Berkman therefore was unaware of his trial until the morning it began.

When Berkman was brought to the courtroom on September 19, the jury had already been empaneled. The district attorney had selected the jury without allowing Berkman to examine prospective jurors, and the judge had no objection to the unusual procedure. Berkman was charged with six counts: felonious assault with the intent to kill Frick; felonious assault with the intent to kill Lawrence Leishman, who had been in Frick's office at the time of the attack; feloniously entering the offices of the Carnegie Steel Company on three occasions; and unlawfully carrying concealed weapons. Berkman pleaded not guilty to all charges.

Frick told the jury about the attempt on his life. The clothes he wore that day, bloody and riddled with holes, were shown to the jury. A physician testified that both of Berkman's weapons, the gun and the dagger, could have caused death. Leishman testified that Berkman fired his pistol at him once and Berkman asked, "Well, did I intend to kill you?" "I think so", Leishman replied, to which Berkman said, "Well that's not true. I didn't intend to do it." Several witnesses told the jury that Berkman had visited the Carnegie offices three times. Berkman's dagger and gun were placed into evidence, and the prosecution rested.

Berkman was asked to call his witnesses, but he had none. Instead, he asked to read his statement to the jury. A German translator was brought to the court. As an atheist, Berkman refused to be sworn in. He began reading his prepared statement. When the translator began to speak on his behalf to the jury, Berkman discovered the man was incompetent. He felt the man's voice was "cracked and shrill" as he spoke to the jury in broken English himself. The effect of the statement, Berkman thought, was being lost. After about an hour, the judge told Berkman it was time to finish his oration.

Without leaving the jury box, the jurors found Berkman guilty on all charges. The judge gave Berkman the maximum sentence for each count: a total of 21 years in prison and one year in the workhouse, to be served consecutively. Berkman argued that he should be sentenced only for the attempt on Frick's life and that the other charges were elements of the main crime of assault with the intent to kill, but the judge overruled his objection. In four hours, Berkman had been tried, convicted, and sentenced. He was brought to serve his sentence at Pennsylvania's Western Penitentiary.

=== Prison ===
Within weeks of his arrival at prison, Berkman began planning his suicide. He tried to sharpen a spoon into a blade, but his attempt was discovered by a guard and Berkman spent the night in the dungeon. He thought about beating his head against the bars of his cell, but worried that his efforts might injure him but leave him alive. Berkman wrote a letter to Goldman, asking her to secure a dynamite capsule for him. A letter was smuggled out of the prison and arrangements were made for her to visit Berkman in November 1892, posing as his sister. Berkman knew as soon as he saw Goldman that she had not brought the dynamite capsule.

Between 1893 and 1897, the years when Bauer and Nold were also in the Western Penitentiary for their part in the assassination attempt, the three men surreptitiously produced 60 issues of a hand-written anarchist newsletter by transferring their work from cell to cell. They managed to send the completed newsletters, which they called Prison Blossoms, to friends outside the prison. Participating in Prison Blossoms, initially written in German and later in English, helped Berkman improve his English. He developed a friendship with the prison chaplain, John Lynn Milligan, who was a strong advocate on behalf of the prison library. Milligan encouraged Berkman to read books from the library, a process that furthered his knowledge of English.

Berkman frequently clashed with the prison's management over the mistreatment of his fellow prisoners. Sometimes he was put into solitary confinement, with one stay lasting 16 months. When Berkman smuggled reports of corruption and brutality outside the prison, resulting in an investigation, he was taken to the dungeon and put in a straitjacket.

Letters from friends were like lifelines to Berkman. "The very arrival of a letter is momentous," he wrote. "It brings a glow into the prisoner's heart to feel that he is remembered." Goldman and anarchist Voltairine de Cleyre were regular correspondents, and other friends wrote frequently.

In 1897, as Berkman finished the fifth year of his sentence, he applied to the Pennsylvania Board of Pardons. Having served as his own attorney, Berkman had failed to object to the trial judge's rulings and thus had no legal basis for an appeal; a pardon was his only hope for early release. The Board of Pardons denied his application in October 1897. A second application was rejected in early 1899.

Now an escape seemed like Berkman's only option. The plan was to rent a house across the street from the prison and dig a tunnel from the house to the prison. Berkman had been given access to a large portion of the prison and had grown familiar with its layout. In April 1900, a house was leased. The tunnel would be dug from the cellar of the house to the stable inside the prison yard. When the digging was complete, Berkman would sneak into the stable, tear open the wooden flooring, and crawl through the tunnel to the house.

Digging the tunnel turned out to be more difficult than expected. The soil was rocky, which forced the men to dig deeper than planned. There, they discovered a leaking gas main, which required the installation of special pumps to bring fresh air to the men. To hide the noise from the digging, one of the crew played piano and sang in the house while the others worked below. On July 5, Berkman visited the prison stable, planning to make his escape. He was horrified to discover that the entrance was blocked by a large load of stones and bricks recently dumped for a construction project.

Three weeks later, some children playing in the street wandered into the yard of the now-vacant house. One of them fell into the cellar and discovered the tunnel. While the prison's Board of Inspectors was unable to identify the inmate involved in the escape attempt, the warden punished Berkman by sending him to solitary confinement for nearly a year. Days after he was released from solitary, Berkman tried to hang himself with a strip of his blanket.

Soon things began looking up for Berkman. He received word that his sentence had been reduced by two-and-a-half years, thanks to a new law. He also received his first visitor in nine years. A month later, Goldman was able to visit under an assumed name. The warden retired and his successor improved the prison for all prisoners.

Early in his incarceration, Berkman questioned whether two men could love one another. He was aware, as he later wrote, that incidents of rape or attempted rape took place "almost every week, yet no one has ever been taken to court ... on such charges". Some of Berkman's own friendships within the prison became physical. He became intimate with one prisoner, "Johnny", when the two were confined to the dungeon. He discussed homosexuality with another prisoner, "George", a formerly married physician who told Berkman about his own homosexual prison affair.

In 1905, Berkman was transported from the Western Penitentiary to the Allegheny County Workhouse, where he spent the final 10 months of his sentence. He found conditions in the workhouse "a nightmare of cruelty, infinitely worse than the most inhuman aspects of the penitentiary." The guards beat inmates at the slightest provocation, and one particularly sadistic guard shoved prisoners down the stairs. Berkman felt mixed emotions; while he was excited about the prospect of freedom, he was concerned about the friends he had made in the prison, and he was worried about what his life as a free man would be like.

=== Release ===
Berkman was released from the workhouse on May 18, 1906, after serving 14 years of his sentence. He was met at the workhouse gates by newspaper reporters and police, who recommended that he leave the area. He took the train to Detroit, where Goldman met him. She found herself "seized by terror and pity" at his gaunt appearance. Later, at a friend's house, Berkman felt overwhelmed by the presence of well-wishers. He became claustrophobic and almost suicidal. Nevertheless, he agreed to a joint lecture tour with Goldman.

Back in New York after the tour, Berkman and Goldman tried to rekindle their romantic relationship, but had lost passion for each other. Instead, Berkman was attracted to some of the younger women in the movement, including a teenager named Becky Edelsohn.

Berkman continued to suffer from depression and increasingly spoke about committing suicide. He began a new lecture tour, but when he failed to appear in Cleveland, concerned friends sent a telegram to Goldman in New York. She worried that he had killed himself. Anarchists across the country searched for Berkman in police stations, hospitals, and morgues. Even newspapers wondered where he was, speculating that he had been kidnapped by Pittsburgh detectives, by Secret Service agents, or by "agents of millionaires" who opposed his message. Three days later, Berkman appeared in New York and contacted Goldman. He said the lecture tour had made him feel miserable. He had purchased a handgun in Cleveland with the intention of killing himself in a city where nobody knew him, but he was unable to complete the act.

Berkman edited Mother Earth from 1907 to 1915.

After resting for several months, Berkman began to recover. He remained anxious about his lack of employment. He considered returning to his old job as a printer, but his skills had become obsolete in light of innovations in linotype machines. With Goldman's encouragement, Berkman began to write an account of his prison years, Prison Memoirs of an Anarchist, and she invited him to become the editor of her journal, Mother Earth. He served as editor from 1907 to 1915 and took the journal in a more provocative and practical direction, in contrast to the more theoretical approach which had been favored by the previous editor, Max Baginski. Under Berkman's stewardship, circulation of Mother Earth rose to as high as 10,000 and it became the leading anarchist publication in the U.S. at the time.

=== Ferrer Center ===
Berkman helped establish the Ferrer Center in New York during 1910 and 1911 and served as one of its teachers. The Ferrer Center, named in honor of Spanish anarchist Francisco Ferrer, included a free school that encouraged independent thinking among its students. The Ferrer Center also served as a community center for adults.

=== The Ludlow massacre and the Lexington Avenue explosion ===
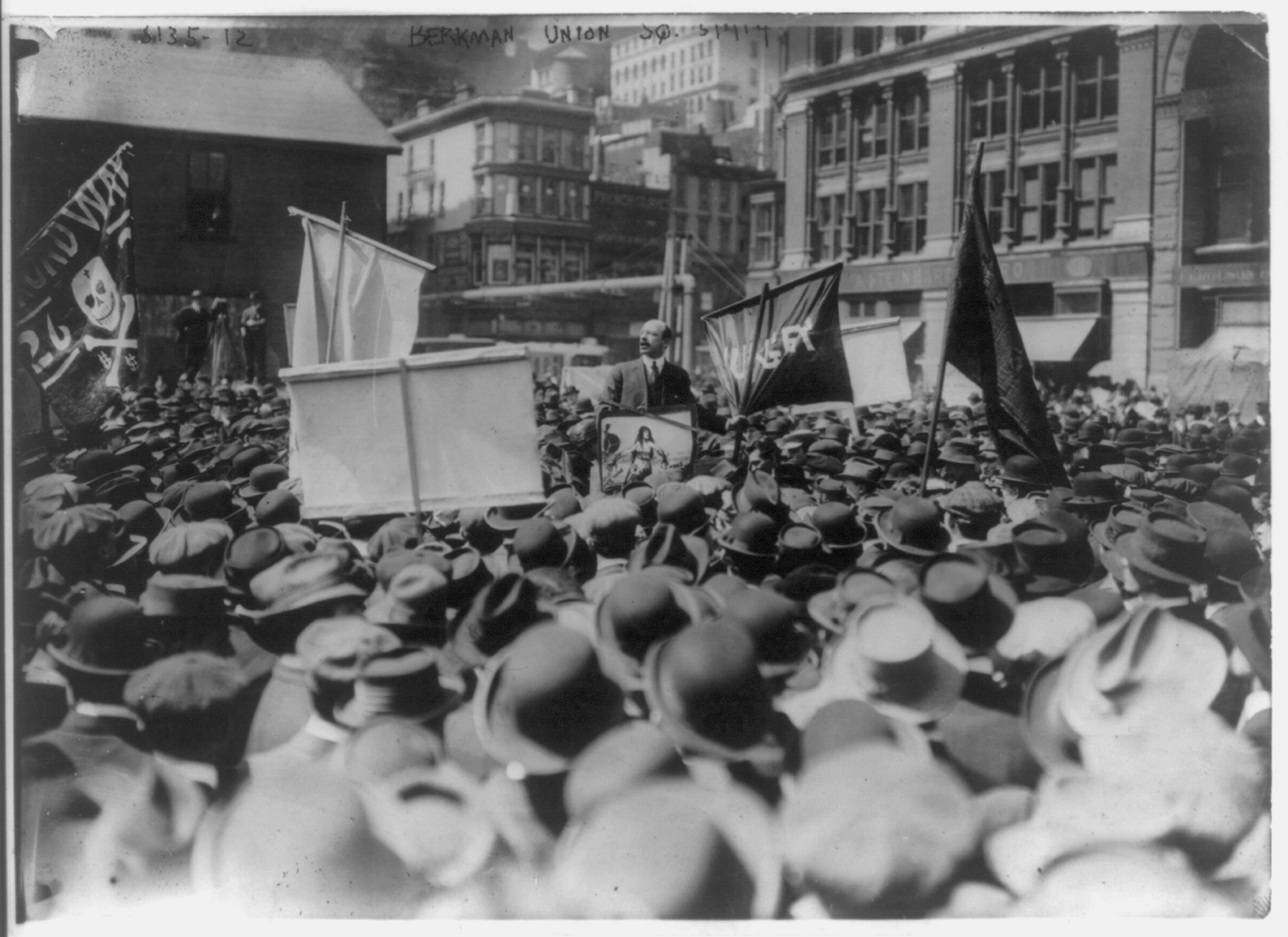
Berkman addressing a May Day rally in New York's Union Square, 1914

In September 1913, the United Mine Workers called a strike against coal-mining companies in Ludlow, Colorado. The largest mining company was the Rockefeller family-owned Colorado Fuel & Iron Company. On April 20, 1914, the Colorado National Guard fought a tent colony of striking miners and, during the day-long fight, 26 people were killed.

During the strike, Berkman organized demonstrations in New York in support of the miners. In May and June, he and other anarchists led several protests against John D. Rockefeller Jr. The protests eventually moved from New York City to Rockefeller's home in Tarrytown, New York, and resulted in beatings, arrests, and imprisonments of anarchists. The strong police response to the Tarrytown protests led to a bomb plot by several Ferrer Center anarchists.

In July, three associates of Berkman—Charles Berg, Arthur Caron, and Carl Hanson—began collecting dynamite and storing it at the apartment of another conspirator, Louise Berger. Some sources, including Charles Plunkett, one of the surviving conspirators, say that Berkman was the chief conspirator, the oldest and most experienced member of the group. Berkman denied any involvement or knowledge of the plan.

At 9 a.m. on July 4, Berger left her apartment for the Mother Earth offices. Fifteen minutes later a deadly explosion took place. The bomb had exploded prematurely, shaking the sixth story of Berger's tenement building, wrecking the three upper floors and killing Berg, Caron, Hanson, and a woman, Marie Chavez, who apparently was not involved in the conspiracy. Berkman arranged the dead men's funerals.

=== The Blast and the Preparedness Day Bombing ===
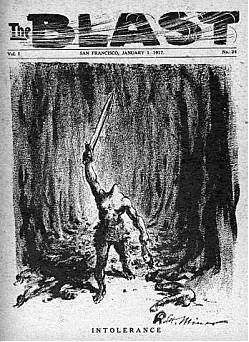
Berkman's journal, The Blast, was influential among American anarchists.

In late 1915, Berkman left New York and went to California. In San Francisco the following year, he started his own anarchist journal, The Blast. Although it was published for just 18 months, The Blast was considered second only to Mother Earth in its influence among U.S. anarchists.

On July 22, 1916, a bomb exploded during the San Francisco Preparedness Day Parade, killing ten people and wounding 40. Police suspected Berkman, although there was no evidence, and ultimately their investigation focused on two local labor activists, Thomas Mooney and Warren Billings. Although neither Mooney nor Billings were anarchists, Berkman came to their aid: raising a defense fund, hiring lawyers, and beginning a national campaign on their behalf. Mooney and Billings were convicted, with Mooney sentenced to death and Billings to life imprisonment.

Berkman arranged for Russian anarchists to protest outside the American embassy in Petrograd during the Russian Revolution, which led U.S. President Woodrow Wilson to ask California's governor to commute Mooney's death sentence. When the governor reluctantly did so, he said that "the propaganda in [Mooney's] behalf following the plan outlined by Berkman has been so effective as to become world-wide." Billings and Mooney both were pardoned in 1939.

=== World War I ===
In 1917 the U.S. entered World War I and Congress enacted the Selective Service Act, which required all men between the ages of 21 and 30 to register for military conscription. Berkman moved back to New York, where he and Goldman organized the No Conscription League of New York, which proclaimed: "We oppose conscription because we are internationalists, anti-militarists, and opposed to all wars waged by capitalistic governments." The organization was at the forefront of anti-draft activism, and chapters were established in other cities. The No Conscription League changed its focus from public meetings to disseminating pamphlets after police started disrupting the group's public events in search of young men who had not registered for the draft.

Berkman and Goldman were arrested during a raid of their offices on June 15, 1917, during which police seized what The New York Times described as "a wagon load of anarchist records and propaganda material". The pair were charged under Espionage Act of 1917 with "conspiracy to induce persons not to register", and were held on $25,000 bail each.

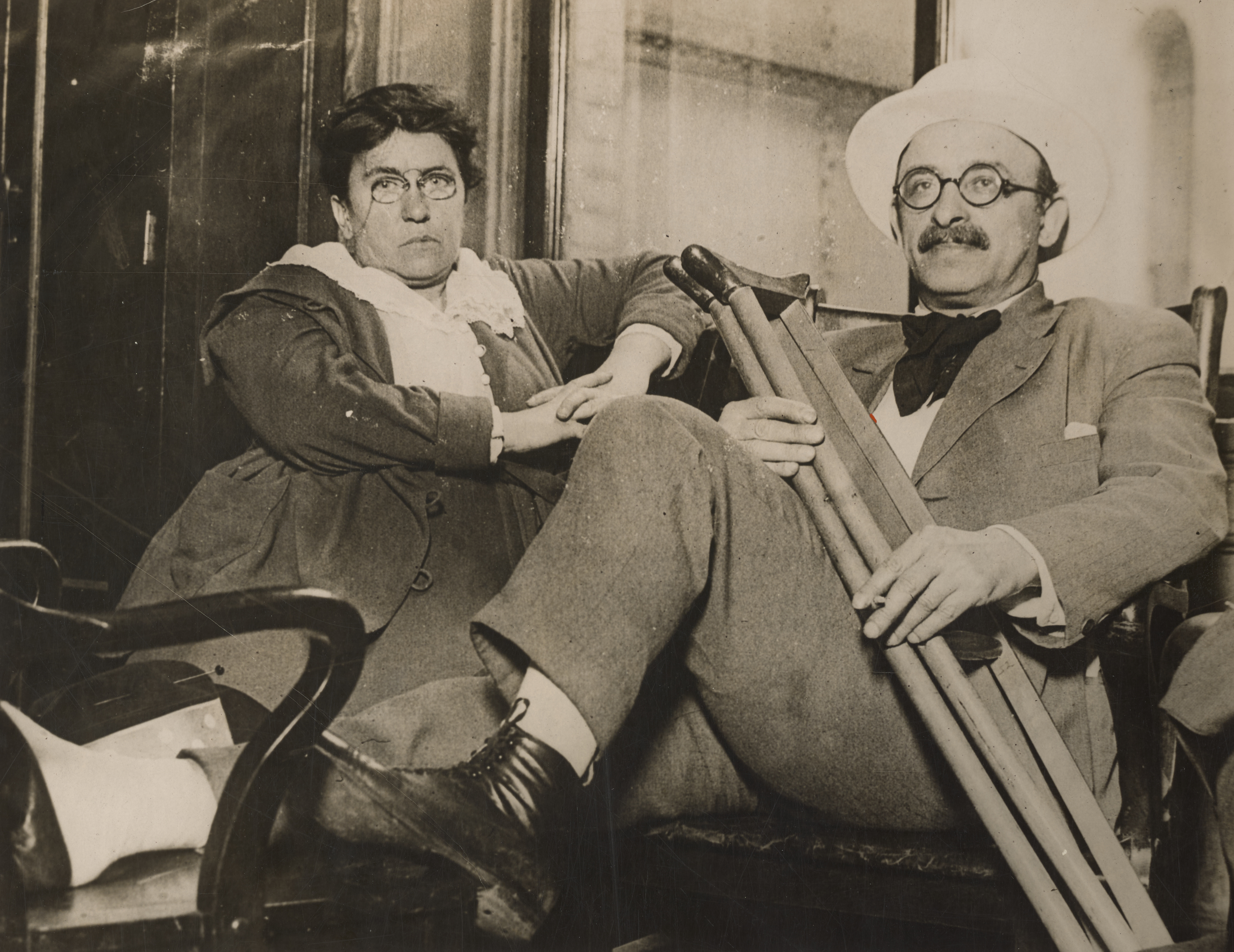
Goldman and Berkman in 1917, following their trial

Berkman and Goldman defended themselves during their trial. Berkman invoked the First Amendment, asking how the government could claim to fight for "liberty and democracy" in Europe while suppressing free speech at home:

Will you proclaim to the world that you who carry liberty and democracy to Europe have no liberty here, that you who are fighting for democracy in Germany, suppress democracy right here in New York, in the United States? Are you going to suppress free speech and liberty in this country, and still pretend that you love liberty so much that you will fight for it five thousand miles away?

The jury found them guilty and Judge Julius M. Mayer imposed the maximum sentence: two years' imprisonment, a $10,000 fine, and the possibility of deportation after their release from prison. Berkman served his sentence in the Atlanta Federal Penitentiary, seven months of which he spent in solitary confinement for protesting the beating of other inmates. When he was released on October 1, 1919, Berkman looked "haggard and pale"; according to Goldman, the 21 months Berkman served in Atlanta took a greater toll on him than his 14-year incarceration in Pennsylvania.

=== Russia ===
Berkman and Goldman were released at the height of the first U.S. Red Scare; the Russian Revolutions of 1917, combined with anxiety about the war, produced a climate of anti-radical and anti-foreign sentiment. The U.S. Justice Department's General Intelligence Division, headed by J. Edgar Hoover and under the direction of Attorney General Alexander Mitchell Palmer, initiated a series of raids to arrest leftists. While they were in prison, Hoover wrote: "Emma Goldman and Alexander Berkman are, beyond doubt, two of the most dangerous anarchists in this country and if permitted to return to the community will result in undue harm." Under the 1918 Anarchist Exclusion Act, the government deported Berkman, who had never applied for U.S. citizenship, along with Goldman and more than two hundred others, to Russia aboard the Buford.

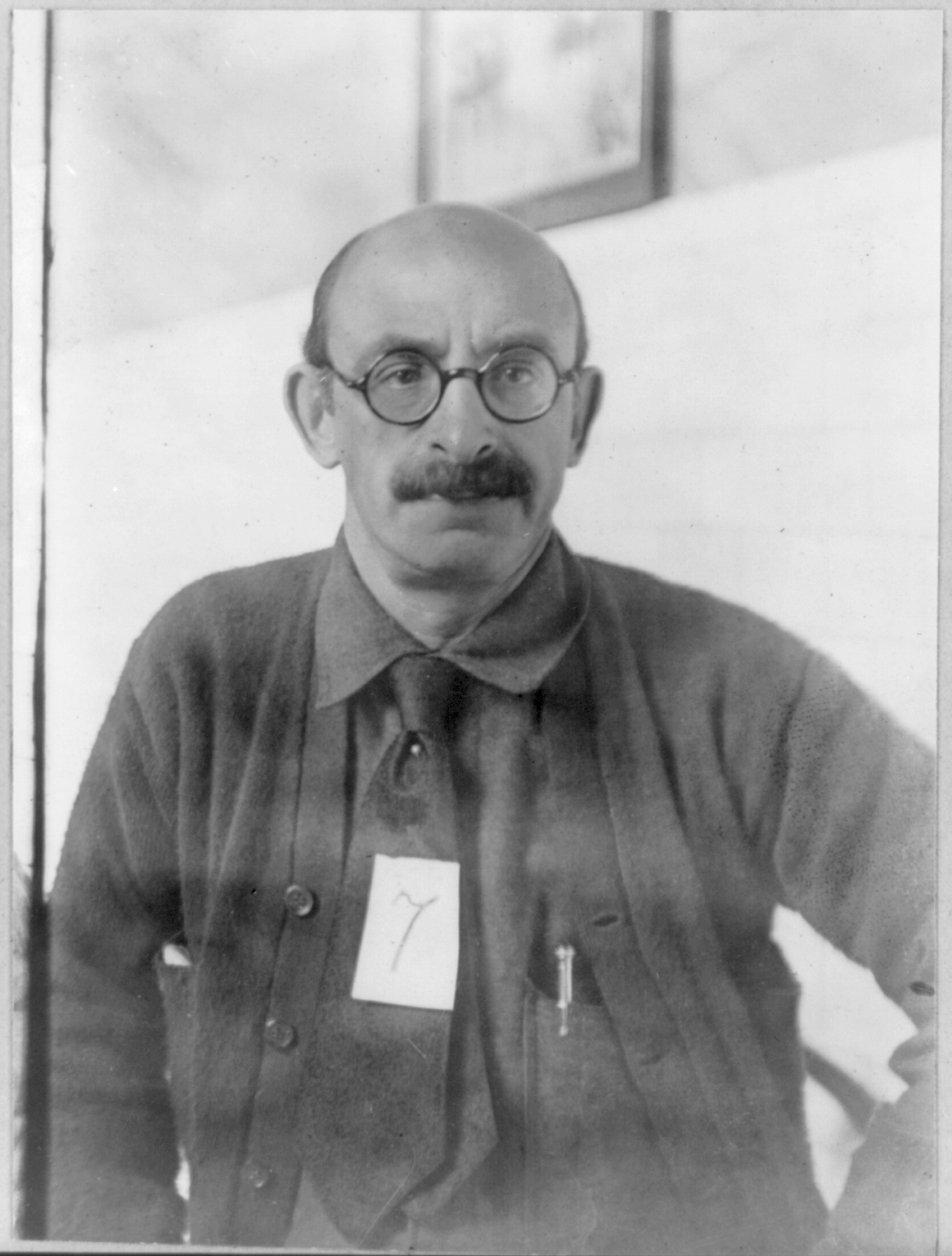
Berkman in 1919, on the eve of his deportation

At a farewell banquet in Chicago, Berkman and Goldman were told the news of the death of Henry Clay Frick, whom Berkman had tried to kill more than 25 years earlier. Asked for a comment by a reporter, Berkman said Frick had been "deported by God".

Berkman's initial reaction to the Bolshevik revolution was enthusiastic. When he first heard of their coup, he exclaimed "this is the happiest moment of my life", and he wrote that the Bolsheviks were the "expression of the most fundamental longing of the human soul". Arrival in Russia stirred great emotions in Berkman, and he described it as "the most sublime day in my life", surpassing even his release after 14 years in prison.

Berkman and Goldman spent much of 1920 traveling through Russia collecting material for a proposed Museum of the Revolution. As the pair traveled around the country, they found repression, mismanagement, and corruption instead of the equality and worker empowerment they had dreamed of. Those who questioned the government were demonized as counter-revolutionaries, and workers still labored under severe conditions. They met with Lenin, who assured them that government suppression of press liberties was justified. "When the Revolution is out of danger," he told them, "then free speech might be indulged in".

Strikes broke out in Petrograd in March 1921 when workers demonstrated for better food rations and more autonomy for their unions. Berkman and Goldman supported the strikers, writing: "To remain silent now is impossible, even criminal." The unrest spread to the port of Kronstadt, where Trotsky ordered a military response. In the battle that ensued, 600 sailors were killed; 2,000 more were arrested; and 500 to 1,500 Soviet troops died. In the wake of these events, Berkman and Goldman decided there was no future in the country for them. Berkman wrote in his diary:

Gray are the passing days. One by one the embers of hope have died out. Terror and despotism have crushed the life born in October. ... Dictatorship is trampling the masses under foot. The Revolution is dead; its spirit cries in the wilderness. ... I have decided to leave Russia.

Berkman and Goldman left the country in December 1921. Berkman moved to Berlin and almost immediately began to write a series of pamphlets about the Russian Revolution. "The Russian Tragedy", "The Russian Revolution and the Communist Party", and "The Kronstadt Rebellion" were published during the summer of 1922.

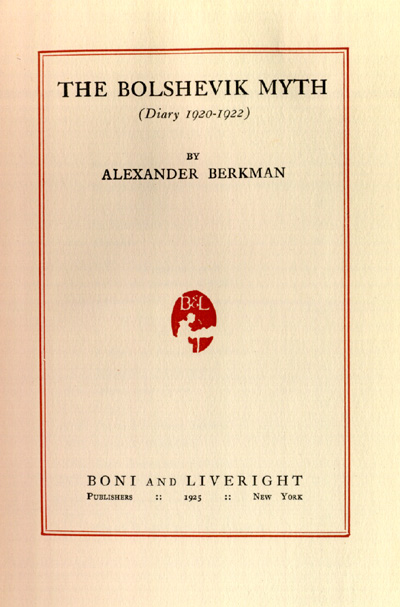
Berkman's experiences in Bolshevist Russia were the basis of The Bolshevik Myth (1925).

Berkman planned to write a book about his experience in Russia, but he postponed it while he assisted Goldman as she wrote a similar book, using as sources material he had collected. Work on Goldman's book, My Two Years in Russia, was completed in December 1922, and the book was published in two parts with titles not of her choosing: My Disillusionment in Russia (1923) and My Further Disillusionment in Russia (1924). Berkman worked on his book, The Bolshevik Myth, throughout 1923 and it was published in January 1925.

=== Now and After ===
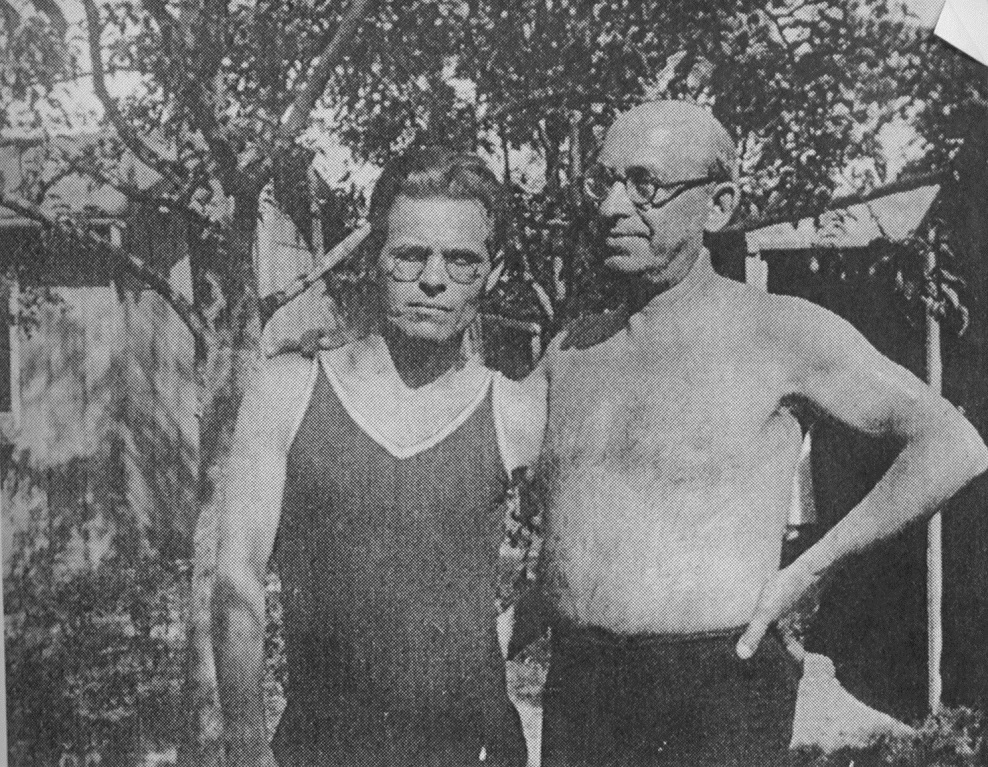
Berkman (right) and Nestor Makhno in Paris, 1927

Berkman moved to Saint-Cloud, France, in 1925. He organized a fund for aging anarchists including Sébastien Faure, Errico Malatesta, and Max Nettlau. He continued to fight on behalf of anarchist prisoners in the Soviet Union, and arranged the publication of Letters from Russian Prisons, which detailed their persecution.

In 1926, the Jewish Anarchist Federation of New York asked Berkman to write an introduction to anarchism intended for the general public. By presenting the principles of anarchism in plain language, the New York anarchists hoped that readers might be swayed to support the movement or, at a minimum, that the book might improve the image of anarchism and anarchists in the public's eyes. Berkman produced Now and After: The ABC of Communist Anarchism, first published in 1929 and reprinted many times since (often under the title What Is Communist Anarchism? or What Is Anarchism?). Anarchist Stuart Christie wrote that Now and After is "among the best introductions to the ideas of anarchism in the English language" and historian Paul Avrich described it as "the clearest exposition of communist anarchism in English or any other language".

=== Final years and death ===
Berkman spent his last years eking out a precarious living as an editor and translator. He and his companion, Emmy Eckstein, relocated frequently within Nice in search of smaller and less expensive quarters. Aronstam, who had changed his name to Modest Stein and attained success as an artist, became a benefactor, sending Berkman a monthly sum to help with expenses. In the 1930s his health began to deteriorate, and he underwent two unsuccessful operations for a prostate condition in early 1936. After the second surgery, he was bed-ridden for months. In constant pain, forced to rely on the financial help of friends and dependent on Eckstein's care, Berkman decided to commit suicide. In the early hours of June 28, 1936, unable to endure the physical pain of his ailment, Berkman tried to shoot himself in the heart with a handgun, but he failed to make a clean job of it. The bullet punctured a lung and his stomach and lodged in his spinal column, paralyzing him. Goldman rushed to Nice to be at his side. Berkman recognized her but was unable to speak. He sank into a coma in the afternoon, and died at 10 o'clock that night.

Goldman made funeral arrangements for Berkman. It had been his desire to be cremated and have his ashes buried in Waldheim Cemetery in Chicago, near the graves of the Haymarket defendants who had inspired him, but she could not afford the expense. Instead, Berkman was buried in a common grave in Cochez Cemetery in Nice.

Berkman died weeks before the start of the Spanish Revolution, modern history's clearest example of an anarcho-syndicalist revolution. In July 1937, Goldman wrote that seeing his principles in practice in Spain "would have rejuvenated [Berkman] and given him new strength, new hope. If only he had lived a little longer!"

== Sources ==
- Avrich, Paul (1988). "Alexander Berkman: A Sketch". Anarchist Portraits. Princeton: Princeton University Press. pp. 200–207. ISBN 978-0-691-04753-9. OCLC 17727270.
- — (1996). Anarchist Voices: An Oral History of Anarchism in America. Princeton: Princeton University Press. ISBN 978-0-691-04494-1.
- — (2006) [1980]. The Modern School Movement: Anarchism and Education in the United States. Oakland, Calif.: AK Press. ISBN 978-1-904859-09-3.
- —; Avrich, Karen (2012). Sasha and Emma: The Anarchist Odyssey of Alexander Berkman and Emma Goldman. Cambridge, Mass.: Harvard University Press. ISBN 978-0-674-06598-7.
- Berkman, Alexander; Goldman, Emma (1917). Trial and Speeches of Alexander Berkman and Emma Goldman in the United States District Court, in the City of New York, July, 1917. New York: Mother Earth Publishing Association. OCLC 808946.
- — (1989) [1925]. The Bolshevik Myth (Diary 1920-1922). London: Pluto Press. ISBN 978-1-85305-032-9.
- — (1992). Fellner, Gene (ed.). Life of an Anarchist: The Alexander Berkman Reader. New York: Four Walls Eight Windows. ISBN 978-0-941423-78-6.
- — (1970) [1912]. Prison Memoirs of an Anarchist. Pittsburgh: Frontier Press. OCLC 174929.
- Brody, Miriam (2011). "Introduction". In Berkman, Alexander; Bauer, Henry; Nold, Carl (eds.). Prison Blossoms: Anarchist Voices from the American Past. Cambridge, Mass.: Harvard University Press. ISBN 978-0-674-05056-3.
- Drinnon, Richard (1961). Rebel in Paradise: A Biography of Emma Goldman. Chicago: University of Chicago Press. OCLC 266217.
- Falk, Candace (1990). Love, Anarchy, and Emma Goldman (2nd ed.). New Brunswick, N.J.: Rutgers University Press. ISBN 978-0-8135-1513-7.
- Glassgold, Peter (2001). "Introduction: The Life and Death of Mother Earth". In Glassgold, Peter (ed.). Anarchy! An Anthology of Emma Goldman's Mother Earth. Washington, D.C.: Counterpoint. ISBN 978-1-58243-040-9.
- Goldman, Emma (1970) [1931]. Living My Life. New York: Dover Publications. ISBN 978-0-486-22543-2.
- — (2003) [1937]. "Preface". In Berkman, Alexander (ed.). What Is Anarchism?. Oakland, Calif.: AK Press. ISBN 978-1-902593-70-8.
- Newell, Peter E. (1977). "Alexander Berkman: An Introduction". In Berkman, Alexander (ed.). ABC of Anarchism. London: Freedom Press. OCLC 234101587.
- Pateman, Barry (2003). "Introduction". In Berkman, Alexander (ed.). What Is Anarchism?. Oakland, Calif.: AK Press. ISBN 978-1-902593-70-8.
- Walter, Nicolas (1989). "Introduction". In Berkman, Alexander (ed.). The Bolshevik Myth (Diary 1920–1922). London: Pluto Press. ISBN 978-1-85305-032-9.
- Weinberger, Harry (1920). "The Emma Goldman and Alexander Berkman Case". The American Labor Year Book. III. New York: Rand School of Social Science: 105–107. OCLC 149637799.
- Wenzer, Kenneth C. (1996). Anarchists Adrift: Emma Goldman and Alexander Berkman. St. James, N.Y.: Brandywine Press. ISBN 978-1-881089-56-8.
- Wexler, Alice (1984). Emma Goldman in America. Boston: Beacon Press. ISBN 978-0-8070-7003-1.
- — (1989). Emma Goldman in Exile. Boston: Beacon Press. ISBN 978-0-8070-7004-8.
- Zinn, Howard (2003) [1980]. A People's History of the United States: 1492–Present. New York: HarperCollins. ISBN 978-0-06-052842-3.

=== Books by Berkman ===
- Prison Memoirs of an Anarchist. New York: Mother Earth Publishing Association. 1912. OCLC 228677284.
- Deportation: Its Meaning and Menace; Last Message to the People of America, with Emma Goldman. New York: M.E. Fitzgerald. 1919. OCLC 4359165.
- The Bolshevik Myth (Diary 1920–1922). New York: Boni and Liveright. 1925. OCLC 1144036.
- Now and After: The ABC of Communist Anarchism. New York: Vanguard Press. 1929. OCLC 83572649.

=== Edited collections ===
- Berkman, Alexander, ed. (2005). The Blast: Complete Collection of the Incendiary San Francisco Bi-Monthly Anarchist Newspaper. Introduction by Barry Pateman. Oakland, Calif.: AK Press. ISBN 978-1-904859-08-6.
- Berkman, Alexander; et al., eds. (2010). The Tragic Procession: Alexander Berkman and Russian Prisoner Aid. Kate Sharpley Library and Alexander Berkman Social Club. ISBN 978-1-873605-90-5.
- Berkman, Alexander; Bauer, Henry; Nold, Carl (2011). Brody, Miriam; Buettner, Bonnie (eds.). Prison Blossoms: Anarchist Voices from the American Past. Cambridge, Mass.: Harvard University Press. ISBN 978-0-674-05056-3.
- Fellner, Gene, ed. (1992). Life of an Anarchist: The Alexander Berkman Reader. New York: Four Walls Eight Windows. ISBN 978-0-941423-78-6.
