= The Bolshevik Myth =

1922 book by Alexander Berkman

The Bolshevik Myth (Diary 1920–1922)
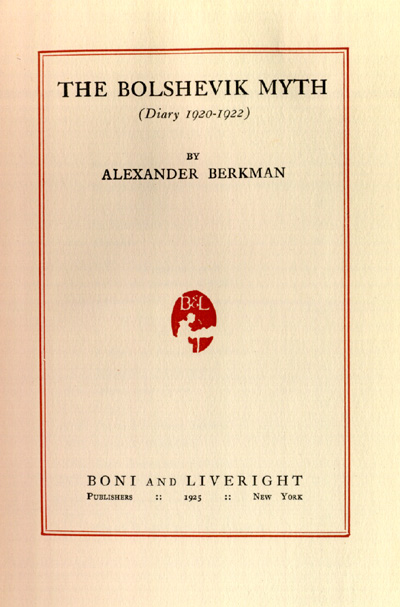
- Title page of the first edition
- Author: Alexander Berkman
- Subject: Bolshevist Russia, Kronstadt rebellion
- Genre: Diary
- Publisher: Boni and Liveright
- Publication date: 1925
- OCLC: 1144036
- Preceded by: Prison Memoirs of an Anarchist
- Followed by: Now and After

The Bolshevik Myth (Diary 1920–1922) is a book by Alexander Berkman describing his experiences in RSFSR from 1920 to 1922, when he saw the aftermath of the October Revolution. Written in the form of a diary, The Bolshevik Myth describes how Berkman's initial enthusiasm for the revolution faded as he became disillusioned with the Bolsheviks and their suppression of all political dissent.

== Plot ==
The narrative of The Bolshevik Myth starts in December 1919, when Berkman and Emma Goldman were deported to Soviet Russia along with over two hundred other anarchists, socialists, and other leftists. Berkman describes conditions on board the transport ship, the Buford. Berkman begins with great enthusiasm for the revolution. Unlike some of his fellow anarchists, he is willing to ignore the very different philosophy of the Bolsheviks. "From now on, we are all one—one in the sacred work of the Revolution", he tells a welcoming committee. "Socialists or anarchists—our theoretical differences are left behind. We are all revolutionists now."

The Bolshevik Myth describes the situation in Petrograd and Moscow. Food is scarce and rations are being cut. At the Moscow rooming house in which Berkman stays, meals are served at a common dining room. Berkman notes that the other residents watch an empty seat at the table. "In their eyes I read the frank hope that the missing one may not come: there will be a little more soup left for the others". In March 1920, Berkman and Goldman meet Lenin, whom Berkman describes as speaking with "a peculiar, almost Jewish, accent". Lenin tells them that freedom of the press is a luxury that cannot be permitted during the early stages of the revolution. Lenin assures them that anarchists will not be persecuted for their beliefs, but "we will not tolerate armed resistance or agitation of that character".

In May 1920, Berkman learns that 45 anarchists have been imprisoned for many months, with no charges brought against them. The prisoners have begun a hunger strike to protest the conditions under which they are being held. Berkman tries to intercede with the Bolshevik leadership on the prisoners' behalf and ten of the anarchists are released, but the remainder are sentenced without trial to five years in prison. Berkman and Goldman are asked to collect material for a planned Museum of the Revolution, which gives them the opportunity to spend the remainder of 1920 traveling the countryside. In Ukraine they learn about Nestor Makhno and his insurrection. They visit a prison and labor camp in Kharkiv.

In February 1921, strikes erupt in Petrograd when workers take to the streets demanding better food rations and more union autonomy. The unrest spreads to the port town of Kronstadt, where the Baltic Fleet is docked. The sailors of the fleet support the striking Petrograd workers; Lenin and Trotsky proclaim them guilty of mutiny and order a military response. Berkman and Goldman try unsuccessfully to intercede. In the fighting that ensues, thousands of sailors and workers are killed. It is becoming evident that the Bolsheviks are persecuting anarchists on ideological grounds. Golos Truda, an anarchist newspaper, is shut down. Growing numbers of anarchists are arrested. Nikolai Bukharin denounces the anarchist movement in Russia as criminal bandits waging war against the Soviet Republic.

The Bolshevik Myth ends in September 1921 with Berkman's decision to leave Russia:

Gray are the passing days. One by one the embers of hope have died out. Terror and despotism have crushed the life born in October.... Dictatorship is trampling the masses under foot. The Revolution is dead; its spirit cries in the wilderness....
I have decided to leave Russia.

== Aftermath ==
Berkman and Goldman left Russia in December 1921. Almost immediately, Berkman began to write a series of pamphlets concerning the Russian Revolution. "The Russian Tragedy", "The Russian Revolution and the Communist Party", and "The Kronstadt Rebellion" were published during the summer of 1922. At the same time, Goldman began writing a book about her experiences in Russia, using material collected by Berkman as sources and with his editorial assistance. Berkman's plans for a book of his own were postponed. He wrote of his concerns to a friend:

What troubles me most is the writing and publication of my diary and book on Russia.... I have consented, willingly and cheerfully, that EG [Emma Goldman] make use of all the data, material, documents, etc., which I had accumulated (and translated), for her book. Moreover, EG's forte is the platform, not the pen, as she herself knows very well. Therefore my days and weeks are now taken up, really entirely, as editor. It is not only that I get no time for my own work, but my diary and my book (if I ever get to it) must of necessity contain the very same things, data and documents, in exactly the same wording even, as EG's book, for the translations are all mine. As her book will be out first, what interest could my book (or even the diary) have on the very same subject, covering the same period, speaking of the same events, of the same places, even, since we visited them together in our work for the Museum of Petrograd, and—worst of all—containing the very same documents, etc., etc.

Work on Goldman's book, My Two Years in Russia, was completed in December 1922, and the book was published in two parts with titles not of her choosing: My Disillusionment in Russia (1923) and My Further Disillusionment in Russia (1924). Berkman worked on The Bolshevik Myth throughout 1923 and it was published in January 1925. According to Nicolas Walter, The Bolshevik Myth suffered from being published after Goldman's book but it received positive reviews nonetheless. American anarchist Harry Kelly wrote a long review in which he described The Bolshevik Myth as "a great piece of literature". British philosopher Bertrand Russell wrote to Berkman that he had read The Bolshevik Myth "with the greatest interest", adding that "[m]y judgment of the Bolsheviks is substantially the same as yours; I went through the same disenchantment, having come with the same hopes."

== Analysis ==
According to Berkman's preface, The Bolshevik Myth is "compiled from" the diary he kept during his two years in Russia, and most readers assume that it is Berkman's diary; however, Nicolas Walter researched Berkman's papers at the International Institute of Social History, and found that the diary format is a basically a literary device. Berkman essentially rewrote the material from his own diary to create The Bolshevik Myth.

== See also ==
- Anarchism and Marxism
- Anarchism in Russia
- Left-wing uprisings against the Bolsheviks
