= Prison Memoirs of an Anarchist =

1912 memoir by Alexander Berkman

- Title page of the first edition
- Author: Alexander Berkman
- Subject: Anarchism, Prison
- Genre: Autobiography
- Publisher: Mother Earth Publishing Association
- Publication date: 1912
- Pages: 512
- OCLC: 228677284
- Followed by: The Bolshevik Myth

Prison Memoirs of an Anarchist is Alexander Berkman's account of his experience in prison in Western Penitentiary of Pennsylvania, in Pittsburgh, from 1892 to 1906. First published in 1912 by Emma Goldman's Mother Earth press, it has become a classic in autobiographical literature. The book touches on themes of political violence and incarceration, as well as develops Berkman's theory of anarchist politics.

== Story ==
The book begins with the details of how Berkman came to be imprisoned: as an anarchist activist, he had attempted to assassinate wealthy industrialist Henry Clay Frick, manager of the Carnegie steel works in Pennsylvania. Frick had been responsible for crushing the Amalgamated Association of Iron and Steel Workers during the Homestead Strike, in which nine union workers and seven guards were killed. However, although Berkman shot Frick two times—Berkman was subdued before the third shot—and stabbed him several times in the leg with a poisoned knife, Frick survived, and Berkman was sentenced to 22 years in prison. Berkman had hoped to awaken the consciousness of the oppressed American people—an attentat—but, as the book goes on to detail, America lacked the political culture to interpret his actions. Even fellow prisoners from the union he was defending failed to see his political intent.

The bulk of the book is set during Berkman's years in prison. Written in first-person, present-tense English (a language that was new to Berkman), it reads like a diary, though it was in fact written after Berkman's release. It is a coming-of-age story that tracks Berkman's difficult loss of his youthful sentimental idealism as he struggles with the physical and psychological conditions of prison life, at times bringing him to the verge of suicide.

As he gets to know the other prisoners, he has nothing but disdain and disgust for them as people, though he sees them as victims of an unjust system. "They are not of my world," he writes. "I would aid them", he says, being "duty bound to the victims of social injustice. But I cannot be friends with them ... they touch no chord in my heart." Gradually, though, Berkman's self-imposed distance and moral high ground begins to crumble as he comes to see the flawed humanity in everyone, including himself.

The Prison Memoirs is also, in part, a tribute to his relationship with fellow anarchist Emma Goldman, to whom he refers repeatedly throughout the book as "the Girl". She is the only person to maintain correspondence with Berkman in prison, and defends him from criticism on the outside, helping him upon his release. The book tracks the development of Berkman's ideas on political violence, and his ruminations often read like a dialog with Goldman, whom he knows intimately.

One of the notable features of the Prison Memoirs is its treatment of homosexuality in prison. Carol Douglas, writing of the book in off our backs, says that Berkman "described how his initial horror at homosexuality in the prison where he was confined gave way to love for another man." In his 2008 study, Free Comrades: Anarchism and Homosexuality in the United States, 1895–1917, Terence Kissack describes Prison Memoirs as "one of the most important political texts dealing with homosexuality to have been written by an American before the 1950s".

== See also ==
- Voltairine de Cleyre § Return to writing
