= Eleanor Fitzgerald =

American editor and theatre professional

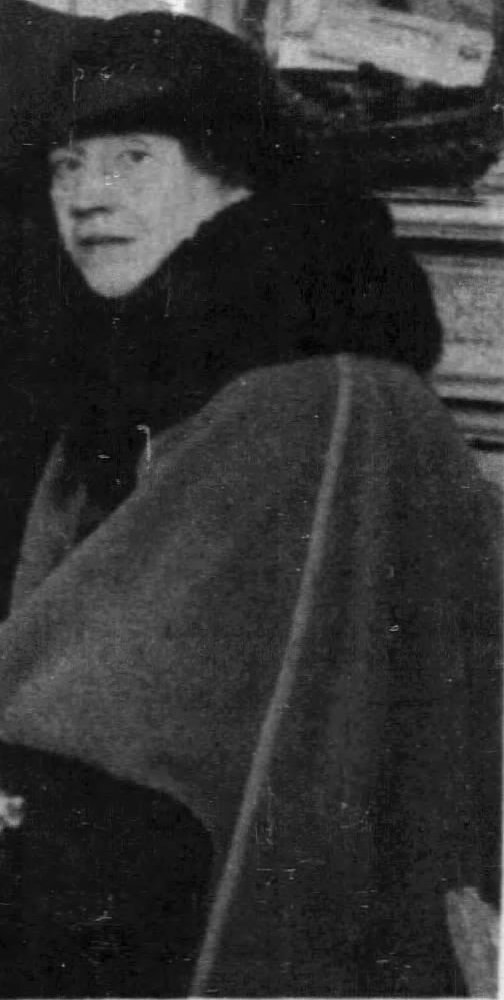
Fitzgerald in 1928 as one of the people Eugene O'Neill was discussing the Russian language version of Lazarus Laughed with.

Mary Eleanor Fitzgerald (March 16, 1877 – March 30, 1955) was an American editor and theatre professional, best known for her association with Emma Goldman and Alexander Berkman, and with the Provincetown Players.

== Early life and education ==
Mary Eleanor "Fitzi" Fitzgerald was born in Deerfield, Wisconsin and raised in Hancock, Wisconsin, the daughter of James and Ada Fitzgerald. She became a teacher at age 16, and planned to be a missionary before leaving the Seventh-day Adventist Church. She worked as a bookkeeper and as a booker and publicist at a speaker agency in Kansas City, Missouri in her twenties.

== Career ==
Fitzgerald moved from Chicago to New York City with Ben Reitman in 1913; the two lived with Emma Goldman. Fitzgerald became assistant editor of Mother Earth alongside Goldman. In 1914 she was part of the Union Square rallies against unemployment. She was also a member of Heterodoxy during this time. In 1915 she moved to San Francisco with Alexander Berkman, and edited The Blast with him. When Goldman and Berkman were arrested in 1917, it was Fitzgerald who raised their bail. She helped to found the Political Prisoners Amnesty League, and was briefly charged with conspiracy in the events surrounding the Mooney-Billings convictions.

She moved into theatrical work in 1918, through her acquaintance with Emma Goldman's niece and fellow Heterodoxy member Stella Cominsky Ballantine. During the 1920s she served in various roles with the Provincetown Players, including as executive director. Agnes Boulton recalled, "[Fitzgerald] stayed with the Provincetown Players, giving them everything she had--her health, her time, her warm devotion, her life--up to the very end." Theatre historian Stella Hanau remarked, "They were so closely bound together that Fitzi without the Provincetown would have been a different person, and the Provincetown without Fitzi cannot be imagined."

Later Fitzgerald worked with the Dramatic Workshop at the New School for Social Research, and with other productions in New York City.

== Personal life ==
Fitzgerald was a tall woman, with striking red hair. She had romantic relationships with Ben Reitman and Alexander Berkman during her decade of political activism, and had a passionate but brief relationship with opera singer Mischa-Leon before his sudden death in 1924. She lived with fellow activist Pauline Turkel for many years, in Greenwich Village and later in Sherman, Connecticut, where Turkel and Fitzgerald hosted Hart Crane and Djuna Barnes among their many guests.

Eleanor Fitzgerald died from cancer in spring 1955, in Hancock, Wisconsin, at the age of 78. Her papers are at the University of Wisconsin-Milwaukee.
