= Jessie Key Habersham =

"Queen" Jessie Key Habersham Michele
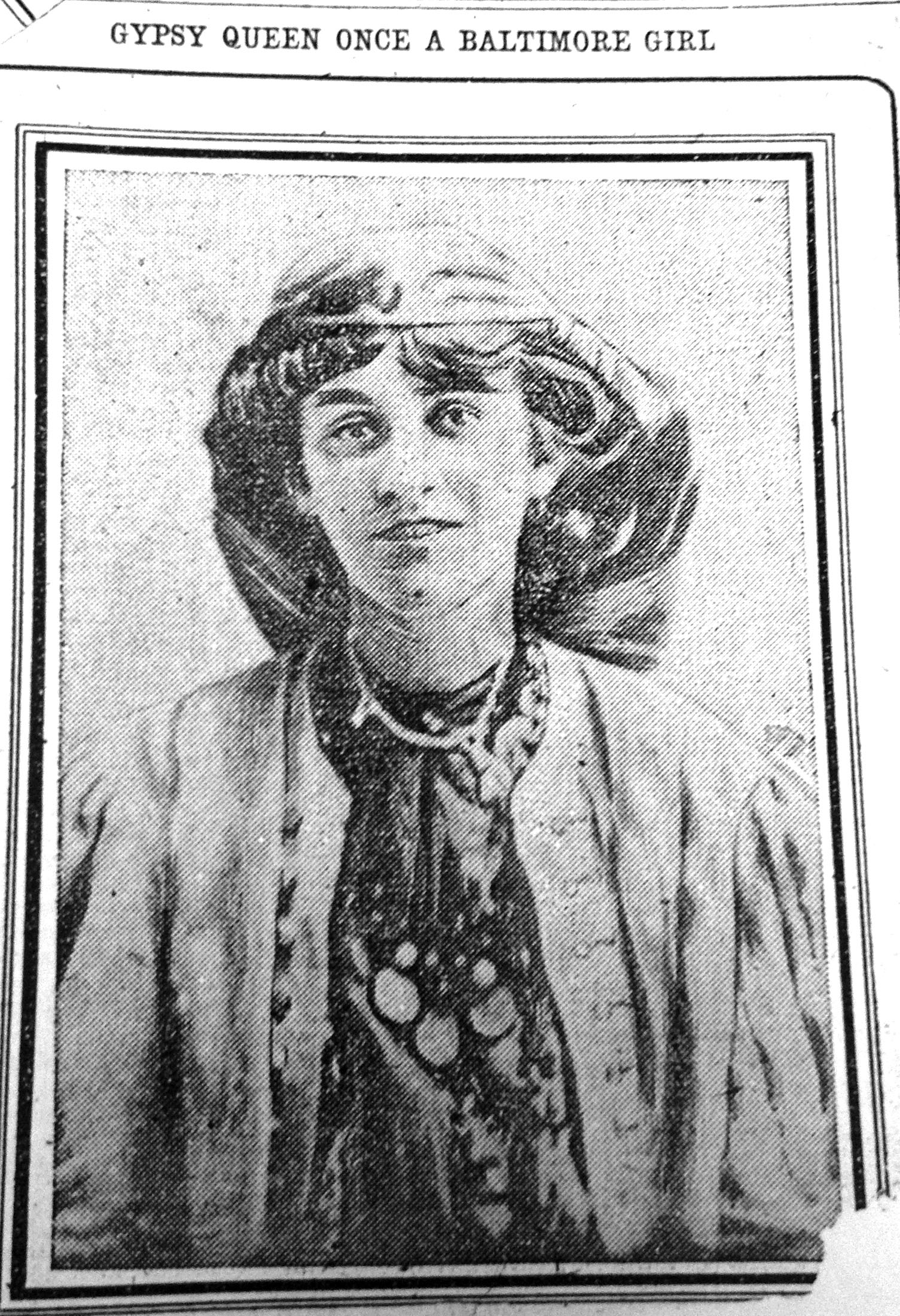
- Born: 23 December 1885; Baltimore, Maryland
- Died: 12 November 1910 (aged 24); Cincinnati, Ohio
- Occupation: fortune teller
- Known for: Society heiress who joined a gypsy band
- Spouse: "King" Jorgas "George" Michele
- Children: Lincka (died 1911)
- Parent(s): Alexander Wylly Habersham and Alice Cornelia Tilson Habersham

Jessie Key Habersham Michele (23 December 1885 – 12 November 1910) was a wealthy woman from a prominent and distinguished family from Baltimore, Maryland, who married a Romani man and became a "Gypsy Queen" of her husband's clan.

== Life ==
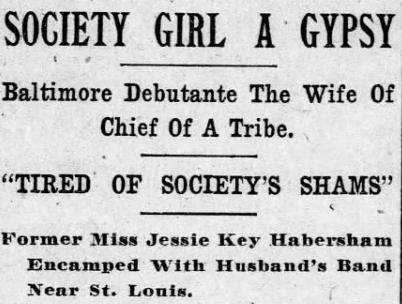
1910 article in the Baltimore Sun about Habersham

Jessie Key Habersham was born on 23 December 1885, into a wealthy white family with deep roots in Maryland. Her family were descendants of Francis Scott Key. Her parents were Alexander Wylly Habersham and Alice Cornelia Tilson Habersham. Her father was a millionaire from his career as a banker and broker.

While living as a debutante, Habersham had disappeared on two occasions. The first time she escaped to Europe for several months to live with family friends. The second time was in 1904. She wrote a letter to her father explaining that she found her life stultifying and lacking in excitement and therefore had run away to join a clan of Romani people. Habersham married King Jorgas Michele, the clan's chief, thereby becoming the matriarch of the clan. She planned on spending the rest of her life travelling the United States with her husband's caravan, spending the last six years of her life living as a nomad. Habersham first became inspired to join the Romani people when she encountered a Romani caravan in Saratoga Springs, New York. After being invited into the camp by Romani women, Habersham became friends with the inhabitants. She returned many times until her teachers banned her from visiting because they worried that Habersham was too "impressionable" and could be kidnapped.

During Habersham's return visit from her escape to Europe, she met a Romani person on the ship who taught her fortune-telling and instructed her in other aspects of Romani spirituality. Habersham made use of her new spiritual skills when she married her husband, making a living as a fortune-teller for customers as her clan moved across the United States. As matriarch, she organized and promoted fairs in each city her clan visited. She stood out among her clan due to her white skin and was highly sought after by white high society women who wanted their fortunes told. Habersham wrote that she had found "more love and truth beneath the canvas of a Romany tent than in any mansion." Habersham painted a Romantic image of Romani life, despite the fact that life was often difficult for Romani people who frequently experienced discrimination.

In 1908, Habersham published a poem in Emma Goldman's Mother Earth magazine titled "The Soul of the People".

On 13 May 1910, Habersham wrote a piece for The Marion Daily Mirror of Marion, Ohio, titled "Why I Left Society to be a Gypsy Queen." She stated that it was her free choice to live with her husband's clan and to reject the "corseted life" of high society.

== Death ==
Habersham died on 12 November 1910, at Seton Hospital in Cincinnati, shortly after giving birth to her daughter Lincka. Following her death, newspapers carried sensationalistic and fabricated headlines spreading rumors that she had been sold by her family for $900, kidnapped by Romani people, placed "under hypnotic influence", or otherwise "compelled to be the slave and wife" of her husband. Her father insisted that she had married George Michele out of love.

She is buried at Loudon Park Cemetery in Baltimore. Linkcka died the next year in the care of guardians in Baltimore.
