= Mother Earth (journal) =

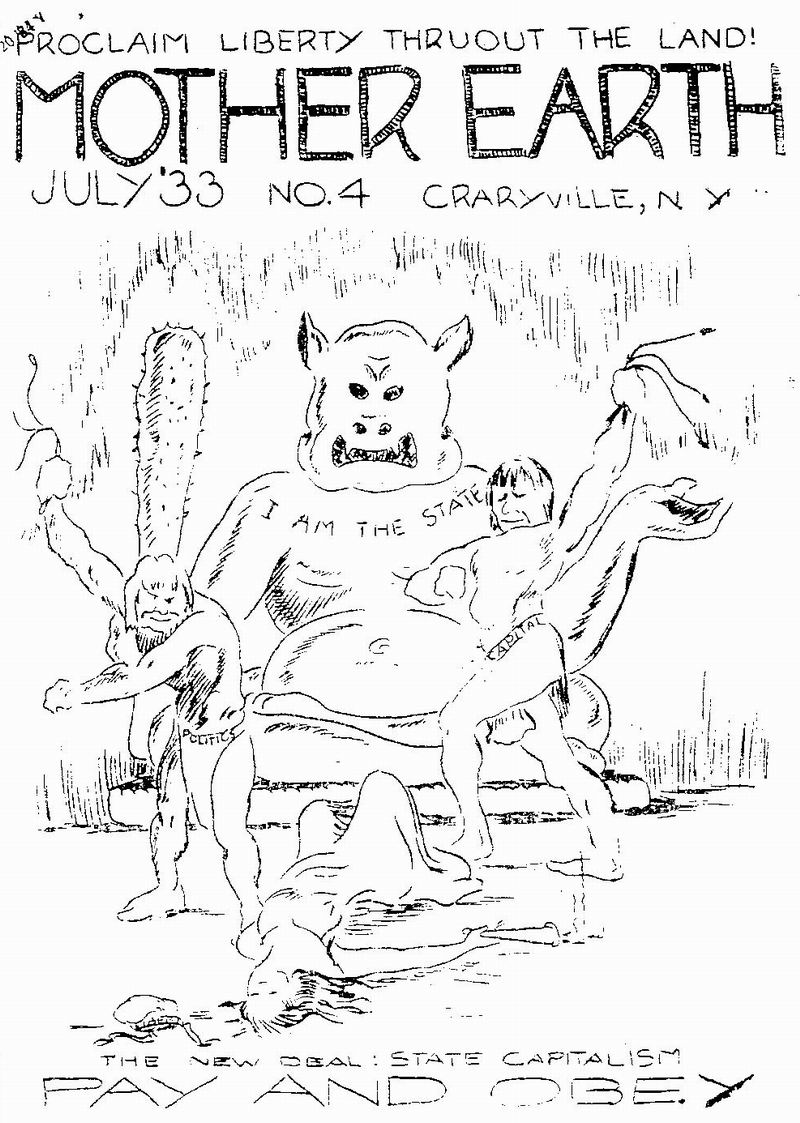
Copy of Mother Earth Journal July, 1933

Mother Earth was an anarchist periodical aimed at the discussion of progressive issues. It included pieces by leading contemporary Anarchists. It was published from 1933–1934. The periodical borrowed its name from the original magazine of that name by Emma Goldman and others, which was published from 1906 to 1917.

== History ==
The first sixteen issues were printed in Craryville, New York. The couple John G. Scott and Jo Ann Wheeler were the editors and primary writers of all sixteen issues of the publication printed there, and they included illustrations by Wheeler in those issues. Scott and Wheeler printed the seventeenth, and final, issue after leaving Craryville to live and teach in the Ferrer Colony and Ferrer Modern School, where their two children attended school. Scott was a teacher of nature studies for about five years. Wheeler was an art and reading teacher in the Modern Schools for seventeen years. In addition to teaching and publishing the journal Mother Earth, the couple farmed a small piece of land in East Taghkanic, New York, following the guidelines of Thoreau's Walden.

The publication included contributions from leading anarchists of the time, including Tom Bell, Laurance Labadie and Carl Nold. Articles debated political issues of the time, including Marxism versus Anarchism, free schools, freedom of speech, and workplace organizing through the Industrial Workers of the World (IWW) and other unions. Other topics included organic and collective farming. The journal described the methods of farming used and way of life in rural upstate New York during the 1930s, and includes discussions from meetings of the United Farmers Protective Association, the National Farmers Holiday Association, and similar organizations.

John G. Scott & Jo Ann Wheeler in the early 1940s

== Ferrer Colony ==
The Ferrer Colony and Modern School of Stelton, New Jersey, a free school to which Scott and Wheeler moved, were established following the assassination of Francisco Ferrer, founder of the original Escuela Moderna in Spain (1909) The Francisco Ferrer Association, established in the east coast of the United States by Emma Goldman, Alexander Berkman and other anarchists, led to the formation of Modern Schools in many parts of the United States. These anarchist leaders published the original Mother Earth magazine until August 1917, after Goldman was jailed for speaking against the draft and against the participation of the United States in the First World War. Wheeler stated to her son, Jon Thoreau Scott, and granddaughter, Nina Scott Frisch, that her journal was named after Goldman's to honour the original Mother Earth and the work of earlier anarchists. During its publication, the original Mother Earth magazine was a major periodical of the anarchist movement.
