= The Blast (magazine) =

American anarchist magazine

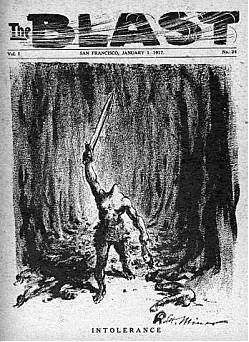
- Categories: Political philosophy; Activism; Anarchism
- Frequency: Semi-monthly
- Publisher: Alexander Berkman
- First issue: January 15, 1916
- Final issue Number: June 1, 1917; Vol. 2 No. 5
- Country: United States
- Based in: San Francisco, California
- Language: English

The Blast was a semi-monthly anarchist periodical published by Alexander Berkman in San Francisco, California, USA from 1916 through 1917. The publication had roots in Emma Goldman's magazine Mother Earth, having been launched when her former consort Berkman left his editorial position at that publication.

== History ==
=== Background ===
Mother Earth was an anarchist magazine established in New York City in March 1906 by Russian-Jewish émigré Emma Goldman (1869-1940) and Max Baginski (1864-1943). Beginning in March 1907, the editorial staff was joined by Alexander Berkman (1870-1936), a consort of Goldman's since 1886.

Berkman had gained fame (or infamy) for his part in the July 1892 attempted assassination of Henry Clay Frick, the manager of the Carnegie Steel Company who in the previous month had emerged victorious in the bitter and violent Homestead Strike of the company's steel works at Homestead, Pennsylvania. Jailed for his failed attempt at political murder, Berkman was only released in May 1906, having served 14 years in prison for his crime. Berkman's joining of the editorial staff of Mother Earth was thus in the nature of a reunion.

In September 1914 Berkman and Goldman split, with Berkman hitting the road in an attempt to organize "Anti-Militarist Leagues" in opposition to World War I and to federate the dispersed array of local anarchist groups into a unified organization. He arrived in California in the spring of 1915 where he became involved in the defense of Mathew Schmidt and David Caplan, anarchists recently arrested following years living underground in connection with the October 1910 fatal bombing of the newspaper plant of the conservative Los Angeles Times. Berkman became a primary organizer of the Caplan-Schmidt Defense League in the summer of 1915 and henceforth devoted the bulk of his time to this legal fight, ending his formal editorial connection with Mother Earth.

=== Establishment ===
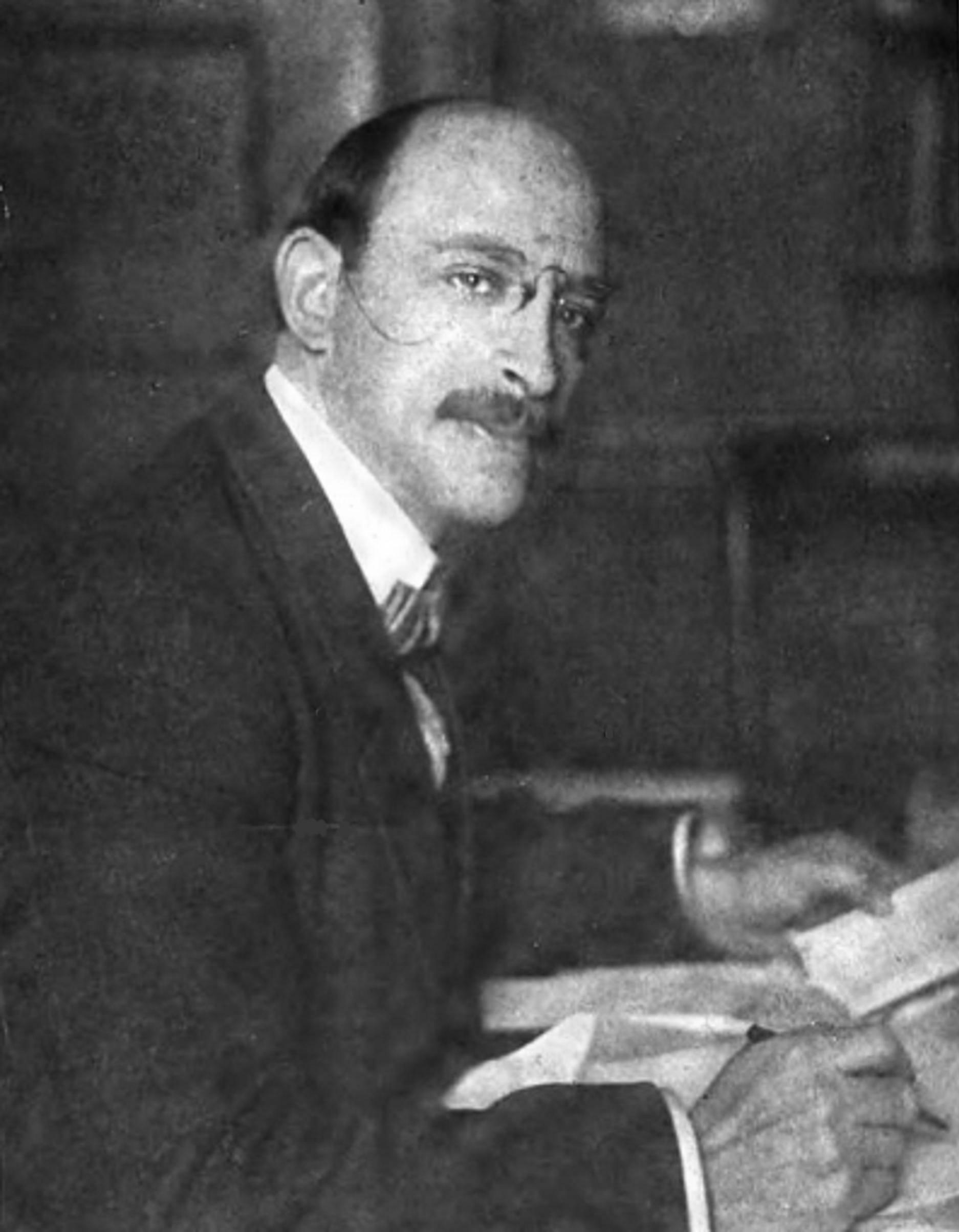
Alexander Berkman, editor and publisher of The Blast.

The first issue of The Blast appeared dated January 15, 1916, with cover art by anarchist cartoonist Robert Minor. Joining Editor and Publisher Berkman at the time of the 8-page magazine's launch was E.B. Morton as associate editor and M. Eleanor Fitzgerald as business manager.

In an introductory editorial statement, Berkman noted that the provocatively named publication would be both destructive and constructive in intent:

Before a garden can bloom, the weeds must be uprooted. Nothing is therefore more important than to destroy. Nothing more necessary and difficult...

To destroy the Old and the False is the most vital work. We emphasize it: to blast the bulwarks of slavery and oppression is of primal necessity. It is the beginning of really lasting construction.

The journal was originally conceived by Berkman as a "revolutionary labor paper" rather than a strictly anarchist newspaper. The Blast focused on the California labor situation and provided news about national labor events and leaders of radical political movements.

Berkman ultimately published 29 issues of The Blast.

=== Preparedness Day Bombing ===
The sensational July 1916 Preparedness Day Bombing of the San Francisco Preparedness Day Parade — a terrorist attack which killed 8 and wounded more than 40 others — took place while Berkman was already publishing The Blast in that same city. The editorial location of the semi-monthly anarchist magazine combined with its inflammatory name proved irresistible to local authorities, who raided the paper's offices on July 29, 1916 without a search warrant. No evidence was located on the premises and there were no arrests made.

When radical labor leaders Warren K. Billings and Tom Mooney as well as Mooney's wife Rena Mooney and two others, were arrested for the crime, Berkman again had occasion to take part in a nationwide legal defense effort, cooperating closely with Mooney-Billings Defense Committee principal Robert Minor in the effort.

In addition to founding the first local Mooney-Billings defense organization, Berkman travelled the country raising funds and public consciousness in support of the effort and winning the commitment of prominent New York attorney W. Bourke Cockran to work on the case on a pro bono basis. Many pages of The Blast, unsurprisingly, were committed to the Mooney-Billings defense effort. This activity led to another police raid on The Blast's offices on December 31, 1916. In this second raid the publication's mailing list and editorial correspondence was seized.

By May 1917 the editorial office of The Blast had been moved from the uncomfortably tense San Francisco to New York City, where it was located in the same building as the editorial office of Mother Earth. Shortly thereafter California authorities, despite having "absolutely no real evidence to go on" from their December raid, nevertheless obtained a grand jury indictment of Berkman on a charge of murder in association with the Preparedness Day bombing. By the time of the California indictment Berkman had already been arrested and detained in New York City along with Emma Goldman on charges of conspiracy to undermine wartime conscription, however, and the West coast case against him came to naught.

=== Termination and legacy ===
The Blast was shut down in June 1917 in the aftermath of Berkman's arrest for encouraging resistance to the draft. The publication's final issue, dated June 1, 1917, featured an anti-militarist cartoon by Maurice Becker on the cover and a short piece signed by Berkman inside which boldly declared:

Conscription is the abdication of your rights as a citizen. Conscription is the cemetery where every vestige of your liberty is to be buried. Registration is its undertaker.

No man with red blood in his veins can be forced to fight against his will. But you cannot successfully oppose conscription if you approve of, or submit to, registration...

The consistent conscientious objector to human slaughter will neither register nor be conscripted.

For their opposition to the American war effort, Berkman and Goldman were convicted of conspiracy to induce people not to register for the draft, as called for by the Selective Service Act of 1917. Both were sentenced to two years in federal prison and began serving their sentences on February 2, 1918. Berkman would spend the duration of the war and all of 1919 in the Atlanta Federal Penitentiary before being deported to Soviet Russia along with Goldman aboard the so-called Red Ark at the end of year, together with 200 other anarchists and sundry radicals.

The complete run of 29 issues of The Blast were re-published in book form by anarchist publisher AK Press in 2005.

== Contributors ==
- Leonard D. Abbott
- Charles Ashleigh
- Alexander Berkman
- Emanuel Haldeman-Julius
- Ed Gammons
- Lydia Gibson
- David Leigh
- Tom Mann
- Robert Minor
- Margaret Sanger
- Warren Van Valkenburgh
- Mary Heaton Vorse
- Charles Erskine Scott Wood
