= Rebel in Paradise =

Rebel in Paradise may refer to:

- Rebel in Paradise (film), 1960 documentary about the artist Paul Gauguin
- Rebel in Paradise: A Biography of Emma Goldman, 1961 biography by Richard Drinnon
