= Now and After =

1929 introduction to the principles of anarchism by Alexander Berkman

Now and After: The ABC of Communist Anarchism
- Title page of the first edition.
- Author: Alexander Berkman
- Subject: Anarchism; Anarchist communism
- Genre: Political philosophy
- Published: 1929 (Vanguard Press)
- Media type: Print
- OCLC: 83572649
- Preceded by: The Bolshevik Myth

Now and After: The ABC of Communist Anarchism is an introduction to the principles of anarchism and anarchist communism written by Alexander Berkman. First published in 1929 by Vanguard Press, Now and After has been reprinted many times, often in partial or abbreviated versions, under the titles What Is Communist Anarchism?, What Is Anarchism?, or The ABC of Anarchism.

Because of its presentation of anarchist philosophy in plain language, Now and After has become one of the best-known introductions to anarchism in print. Anarchist Stuart Christie wrote that Now and After is "among the best introductions to the ideas of anarchism in the English language". Historian Paul Avrich described it as "a classic" and wrote that it was "the clearest exposition of communist anarchism in English or any other language".

== History ==
The anarchist movement was under siege during the 1920s. The United States had deported hundreds of anarchists, including Berkman and Emma Goldman, in 1919. In the newly created Soviet Union, Russian anarchists were being arrested by the Cheka and imprisoned or executed. In Ukraine, an anarchist army led by Nestor Makhno had been defeated by the Red Army. Hundreds of Russian anarchists were fleeing to exile in Germany and France. In an effort to revive the movement, the Jewish Anarchist Federation in New York City asked Berkman in 1926 to write an introduction to anarchism intended for the public. By presenting the principles of anarchism in plain language, the New York anarchists hoped that readers might be swayed to support the movement or, at a minimum, that the book might improve the image of anarchism and anarchists in the public's eyes. Parts of the work initially appeared in the Yiddish anarchist newspaper, Freie Arbeiter Stimme.

=== Versions ===
In May 1929, Berkman's complete work was first published by Vanguard Press in New York (jointly with the Jewish Anarchist Federation) under the title Now and After: The ABC of Communist Anarchism, consisting of 31 chapters grouped into three sections: "Now", "Anarchism" and "The Social Revolution". Simultaneously, they also printed a cheaper edition in smaller format using the title What Is Communist Anarchism? as an instalment of their running series on "social philosophies". After Berkman's death in 1936, a second edition using the original title was reissued in August 1937 by Freie Arbeiter Stimme with a preface by Emma Goldman.

In May 1942, during World War II, Freedom Press in London published the first British edition, using the name ABC of Anarchism, opting on grounds of expense to leave out the first of the three sections of the original work, titled "Now", consisting of 18 chapters dealing primarily with the ills of contemporary capitalist society, criticism of socialist parties and of the Russian Revolution. Since then, the book (most frequently the abridged version) has been reprinted many times and translated into many languages. In 1989, Phoenix Press published the 18 chapters left out of the Freedom Press version, and many subsequent printings, in a separate volume, titled What is Communist Anarchism? Complete unabridged reprints of the first edition from 1929 (supplemented by Goldman's preface from the 2nd edition) have been put out by Dover Publications in 1972, reprinted in 2005 as The ABC of Anarchism.

== The book ==
Berkman's work explains anarchist philosophy in terms that uninitiated readers can understand. The book's chapters are brief, and many of them begin with questions (e.g., "Is Anarchism Violence?", "Will Communist Anarchism Work?"). A number of the ideas he discusses are similar to those proposed in The Conquest of Bread by Peter Kropotkin, whom Berkman cites throughout. Berkman avoids the sort of jargon and technical language that is often used by political writers in favour of plain language. As he writes in his foreword:

Anarchist books, with few exceptions, are not accessible to the understanding of the average reader. It is the common failing of most works dealing with social questions that they are written on the assumption that the reader is already familiar to a considerable extent with the subject, which is generally not the case at all. As a result there are very few books treating of social problems in a sufficiently simple and intelligible manner. For the above reason I consider a restatement of the Anarchist position very much needed at this time—a restatement in the plainest and clearest terms which can be understood by every one. That is, an ABC of Anarchism.

== Editions ==
- Berkman, Alexander (1929). "Now and After: The ABC of Communist Anarchism". HathiTrust (1st ed.).
- Berkman, Alexander (1937). "Now and After: The ABC of Communist Anarchism". HathiTrust (2nd ed.).
- Berkman, Alexander (1989). What is Communist Anarchism?. Phoenix Press. ISBN 978-0-948984-11-2.
- Berkman, Alexander (2003). What is anarchism?. Working Classics series. Edinburgh, Scotland: AK Press. ISBN 1-902593-70-7.
- Berkman, Alexander; Goldman, Emma (2005-01-01). The ABC of Anarchism. Courier Corporation. ISBN 978-0-486-43369-1.
