= Julia May Courtney =

American writer

Julia May Courtney (June 7, 1873 – 1951) was an American anarchist and writer. Courtney was born in Clifton Springs, New York and moved to Denver, Colorado in 1881. She is best known for her article for Mother Earth about the Colorado Ludlow Massacre entitled "Remember Ludlow!" Courtney also co-founded a Denver branch of the Ferrer Association around 1911 with Duren J.H. Ward and intended to eventually start a "Modern School". Courtney was a poet and contributed regularly to Up the Divide, a turn of the century periodical edited by Ward that was devoted to seeing religion and life "from new altitudes."
