= Adolf Wolff =

Anarchist artist (1883–1944)

- Born: March 1883; Brussels
- Died: 1944 (aged 60–61)

Adolf Wolff (1883–1944) was a visual artist, poet, anarchist, and socialist based in New York City, active between 1912 and 1920. He attended school such as National Academy of Design in New York and the Academie Royale des Beaux Arts in Brussels. He taught at the Ferrer School and contributed to The Modern School, the magazine published by the Ferrer Association. Wolff exhibited his vanguard sculpture regularly in NYC, and was active in anarchist and socialist activities of the day. In September 1914, he was arrested and imprisoned on Blackwell Island for thirty days.
