= Emma Goldman in America =

1984 biography by Alice Wexler

- Author: Alice Wexler
- Original title: Emma Goldman: An Intimate Life
- Subject: Biography
- Publisher: Pantheon Books
- Publication date: 1984
- Pages: 339

Emma Goldman in America is a biography of Emma Goldman by historian Alice Wexler originally published as Emma Goldman: An Intimate Life in 1984. It covers the first five decades of Goldman's life. Wexler published a second volume on the remainder: Emma Goldman in Exile (1989).

== Bibliography ==
- Buhle, Mari Jo (January 23, 1985). "Emma Goldman: The Private Side of Living Her Life". In These Times. pp. 18–19.
- Fishbein, Leslie (1985). "Review of Emma Goldman: An Intimate Life". The Journal of American History. 72 (1): 171–172. doi:10.2307/1903799. ISSN 0021-8723. JSTOR 1903799.
- Frazer, Winifred L. (1984). "Review of Love, Anarchy, and Emma Goldman; Emma Goldman: An Intimate Life". Resources for American Literary Study. 14 (1/2): 198–206. ISSN 0048-7384. JSTOR 26366428.
- Gerrard, Nicci (March 1, 1985). "Gadfly". The New Statesman. p. 27.
- Herzog, Don (August 1985). "Reviews of Love, Anarchy, and Emma Goldman: A Biography; Emma Goldman: An Intimate Life". The American Spectator. pp. 37–38.
- Moore, John (1987). "Review of Emma Goldman: An Intimate Life". Journal of American Studies. 21 (2): 286–287. doi:10.1017/S0021875800029352. ISSN 0021-8758. JSTOR 27554850. S2CID 145307554.
- Murray, Sylvie (1988). "Review of Emma Goldman in America". Labour / Le Travail (in French). 22: 323–325. doi:10.2307/25143075. ISSN 0700-3862. JSTOR 25143075.
- Myers, Constance Ashton (1986). "Review of Love, Anarchy, and Emma Goldman; Emma Goldman: An Intimate Life". The American Historical Review. 91 (3): 754–755. doi:10.1086/ahr/91.3.754-a. ISSN 0002-8762. JSTOR 1869316.
- Rosenberg, Karen (1984). "Emma's Ambiguous Legacy". The Women's Review of Books. 2 (2): 8–9. doi:10.2307/4019469. ISSN 0738-1433. JSTOR 4019469.
- Sochen, June (1985). "Review of Love, Anarchy, and Emma Goldman; Emma Goldman: An Intimate Life". American Jewish History. 75 (1): 107–109. ISSN 0164-0178. JSTOR 23882674.
- Sternhell, Carol (November 24, 1984). "Human, All Too Human". The Nation. pp. 557–558.
- Wexler, Alice (1992). "Emma Goldman and the Anxiety of Biography". In Alpern, Sara; Antler, Joyce; Perry, Elisabeth Israels; Scobie, Ingrid Winther (eds.). The Challenge of Feminist Biography: Writing the Lives of Modern American Women. University of Illinois Press. pp. 34–50. ISBN 978-0-252-06292-6.
