= Richard Drinnon =

American activist and academic

Richard T. Drinnon
- Born: January 4, 1925
- Died: April 19, 2012 (aged 87)
- Known for: Historiography of American empire and radicalism

Academic background
- Education: University of Minnesota
- Influences: Emma Goldman

Academic work
- Discipline: History
- Institutions: University of California, Berkeley; Bucknell University

Richard T. Drinnon (January 4, 1925 – April 19, 2012) was professor emeritus of history at Bucknell University. He also taught at the University of California, Berkeley, where he taught courses on American history. He was denied tenure due to his political activism and was about to be called up by the House Un-American Activities Committee. Drinnon participated in the Columbia University protests of 1968, and he published several books, including "Rebel in Paradise: A Biography of Emma Goldman" and "Facing West: The Metaphysics of Indian-Hating and Empire-Building."

== Early life and education ==
Drinnon received a PhD from the University of Minnesota.

== Career ==
In 1961, while Drinnon was a professor at the University of California, Berkeley, he was discovered by police to be the next person on the target list of John Harrison Farmer, who felt that he was on a mission from God to kill people who he believed were associated with communism.

While there he taught two popular courses on "A Critical View of American History" which emphasized the negatives during American history from 1776 to the present. He ultimately was denied tenure because of his political activism. He protested the execution of Caryl Chessman, was the first faculty advisor for SLATE, the activist student union, and was about to be called up to the House Un-American Activities Committee (HUAC) because they suspected him of being a communist. At the time he was denied tenure he had already published his first book, Rebel in Paradise: A Biography of Emma Goldman.

During the Columbia University protests of 1968, Drinnon participated in a student walkout of a speech at Bucknell University by Vice President Hubert H. Humphrey, when Humphrey blamed protesters for disorder on the campus. Drinnon shouted "This is a disgrace," and walked out along with about 30 students.

== Works ==
=== Books ===
- Facing West: The Metaphysics of Indian-Hating and Empire-Building. University of Oklahoma Press. March 1997. ISBN 978-0-8061-2928-0.
- Keeper of Concentration Camps: Dillon S. Myer and American Racism. Berkeley: University of California Press, 1987. ISBN 0-520-05793-7.
- Rebel in Paradise: A Biography of Emma Goldman. Chicago: University of Chicago Press, 1982. ISBN 978-0226163642.
- White Savage: The Case of John Dunn Hunter. Schocken Books, 1972. ISBN 978-0805234619.

== See also ==
- David Stannard
- Harrisburg Seven
- Kirkpatrick Sale
- Native American Studies
- Thomas Jefferson and Indian removal
- Ward Churchill
