= Alice Wexler =

American author and historian

- Born: May 31, 1942; New York, New York
- Education: Doctor of Philosophy
- Alma mater: Indiana University
- Occupation: College professor
- Awards: Guggenheim Fellowship (1999)

Alice Ruth Wexler (born May 31, 1942) is an American author and historian. She has written two biographies on the anarchist Emma Goldman. Wexler has also written about Huntington's disease, which has affected her family and which her younger sister, Nancy Wexler, researches.

== Early life and career ==
Alice Ruth Wexler was born May 31, 1942, in New York, New York, to Leonore (Sabin) and Milton. Though her parents divorced in 1962, her mother's diagnosis of Huntington's disease late in the 1960s became a central research focus of the family. Wexler taught at Sonoma State University from 1972 to 1982. She served as a visiting professor of history at multiple American universities and received a Guggenheim Fellowship in 1999.

== Works ==
- Emma Goldman: An Intimate Life (1984)
- Emma Goldman in Exile (1989)
- Mapping Fate: A Memoir of Family, Risk, and Genetic Research (1995)
- The Woman Who Walked into the Sea: Huntington's and the Making of a Genetic Disease (2008)
