= Emma Goldman in Exile =

1989 biography by Alice Wexler

- Author: Alice Wexler
- Subject: Biography
- Publisher: Beacon Press
- Publication date: 1989
- Pages: 301

Emma Goldman in Exile: From the Russian Revolution to the Spanish Civil War is a 1989 biography of Emma Goldman by historian Alice Wexler. It is a sequel to Emma Goldman in America (1984), which covers Goldman's first five decades.

== Bibliography ==
- De Leon, David (1990). "Review of Emma Goldman in Exile: From the Russian Revolution to the Spanish Civil War". The Journal of American History. 77 (2): 709–710. doi:10.2307/2079294. ISSN 0021-8723. JSTOR 2079294.
- Gallagher, Dorothy (October 2, 1989). "A Desperate Situation". The Nation. pp. 356–357.
- Long, Priscilla (1989). "Politics with a Passion". The Women's Review of Books. 7 (3): 7–8. doi:10.2307/4020626. ISSN 0738-1433. JSTOR 4020626.
- Nelson, Bruce C. (1991). "Review of Emma Goldman in Exile: From the Russian Revolution to the Spanish Civil War". The American Historical Review. 96 (3): 841–842. doi:10.2307/2162460. ISSN 0002-8762. JSTOR 2162460.
- Shatz, Marshall S. (1993). "Wexler, 'Emma Goldman in Exile'". The Jewish Quarterly Review. 83 (3/4): 458–460. doi:10.2307/1455181. ISSN 0021-6682. JSTOR 1455181.
- Sorin, Gerald (1989). "Review of Emma Goldman in Exile: From the Russian Revolution to the Spanish Civil War". American Jewish History. 79 (2): 279–281. ISSN 0164-0178. JSTOR 23884405.
- Wexler, Alice (1992). "Emma Goldman and the Anxiety of Biography". In Alpern, Sara; Antler, Joyce; Perry, Elisabeth Israels; Scobie, Ingrid Winther (eds.). The Challenge of Feminist Biography: Writing the Lives of Modern American Women. University of Illinois Press. pp. 34–50. ISBN 978-0-252-06292-6.
