= USAT Buford =

Transport ship of the United States Army

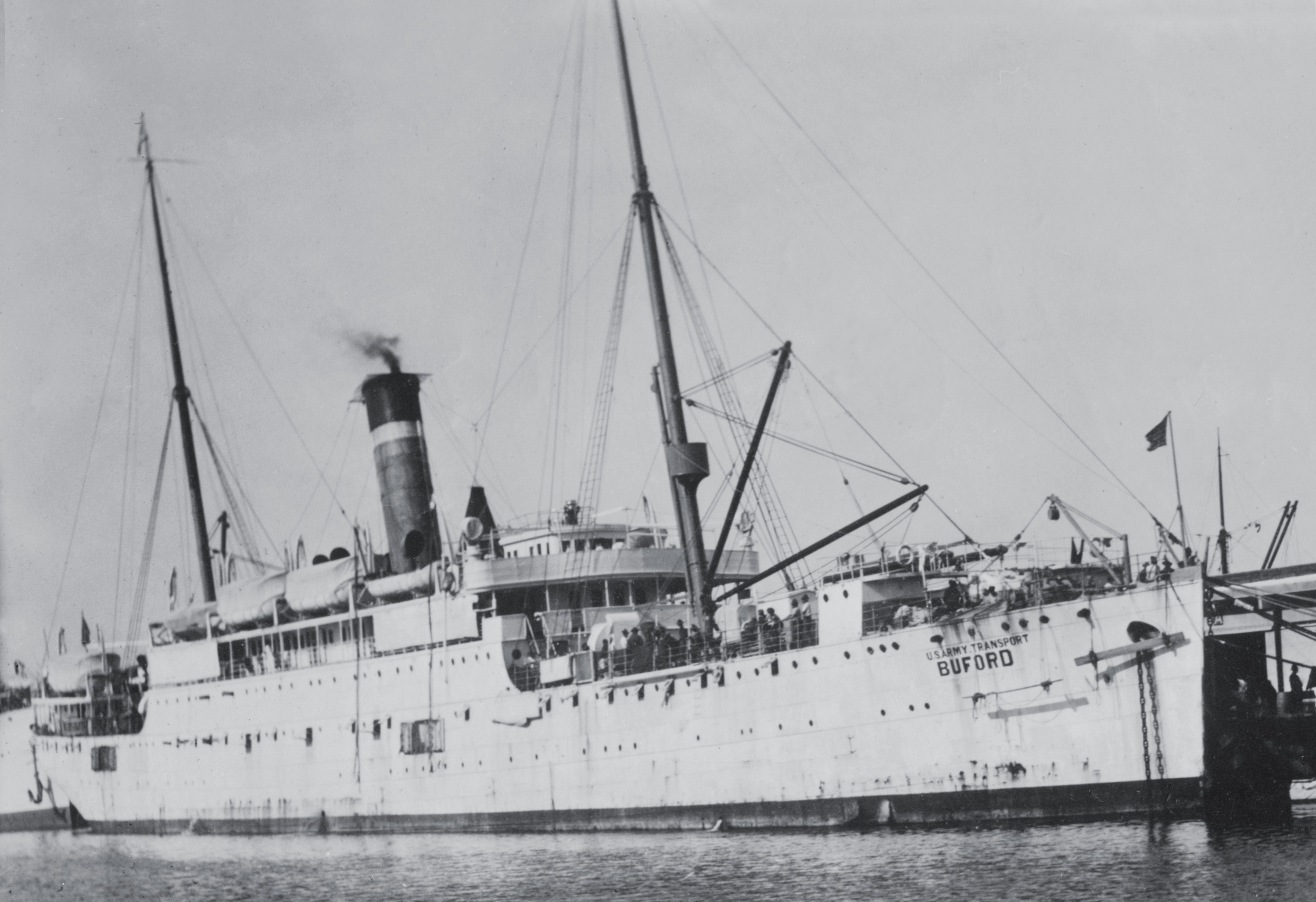
- USAT Buford at Galveston harbor in 1915

History
- Name: SS Mississippi (1890–1898); USAT Buford (1898–1919); USS Buford (ID 3818) (1919); USAT Buford (1919–1923); SS Buford (1923–1929)
- Owner: Atlantic Transport Line (1890–1898); US Army (1898–1919); US Navy (1919); US Army (1919–1923); Alaskan Siberian Navigation Company (1923–1929)
- Builder: Harland and Wolff, Belfast
- Launched: 29 August 1890
- Commissioned: By the US Navy on 15 January 1919
- Decommissioned: 2 September 1919
- Fate: Scrapped in 1929

General characteristics
- Type: Cargo ship
- Displacement: 8,583 tons
- Length: 370 ft 8 in (112.98 m)
- Beam: 44 ft 2 in (13.46 m)
- Draft: 26 ft (7.9 m)
- Depth of hold: 30 ft 6 in (9.30 m)
- Propulsion: one 375 nhp Harland and Wolff; triple expansion engine; with 3 cylinders of 25½", 42", and 70" diameter respectively, stroke 51", one shaft, two double-ended boilers.
- Speed: 11 knots (20 km/h)
- Complement: 202
- Armament: 2 × 3" mounts

USAT Buford was a combination cargo/passenger ship, originally launched in 1890 as the SS Mississippi. She was purchased by the U.S. Army in 1898 for transport duty in the Spanish–American War. In 1919, she was briefly transferred to the U.S. Navy, commissioned as the USS Buford (ID 3818), to repatriate troops home after World War I, and then later that year returned to the Army.

In December 1919, nicknamed the Soviet Ark (or the Red Ark) by the press of the day, the Buford was used by the U.S. Department of Justice and Department of Labor to deport 249 non-citizens to Russia from the United States because of their alleged anarchist or syndicalist political beliefs.

She was sold to private interests in 1923, contracted in mid-1924 to be the set for Buster Keaton's silent film The Navigator, and finally scrapped in 1929.

== Ship's history ==
The ship began life as the SS Mississippi, constructed by Harland & Wolff of Belfast, Ireland for Bernard N. Baker of Baltimore and the Atlantic Transport Line. While under de facto American ownership, she would fly the British flag, due to the economies of the navigation laws of the period. The Mississippi was launched on 29 August 1890 and began her maiden voyage, from London, on 28 October 1890. In command was her first captain, Hamilton Murrell, "Hero of the Danmark Disaster," who a year earlier had saved 735 lives from the sinking Danish passenger ship Danmark, the largest single rescue at the time.

For the first year of her career, the Mississippi plied the waters between London, Swansea, Philadelphia and Baltimore.

In January 1892, the Mississippi was moved to the London–New York route, where she remained until she was purchased by the U.S. Army Quartermaster Department as part of a seven-ship deal on 24 June 1898, and became an army transport ship, serving in the Caribbean theater of the Spanish–American War. The Mississippi was assigned the number "25" on 5 July 1898. However, she sailed under her given name until 2 March 1899, the following year, when she was officially renamed the USAT Buford, in honor of Gen. John T. Buford, the Union cavalry officer and hero of the Battle of Gettysburg of the American Civil War.

On 28 May 1900, the Buford entered the naval yards of the Newport News Shipbuilding Company for a major refitting as a troopship for service between the United States and the Philippines. Two of her original four masts were removed; the other two were replaced with long masts. While under conversion, the Buford would miss the peak of the Boxer Rebellion. Once back in service in November of that year, the Buford took up regular service on the Pacific run from San Francisco to Honolulu and Guam terminating in Manila and returning via Nagasaki and Honolulu.

At 5:12 am on Wednesday, 18 April 1906, the Buford was in San Francisco when the Great Quake of 1906 struck. She was taken from the pier into the bay to avoid the resultant fire and was one of three transports—Buford, Crook and Warren—used in the harbor as temporary storehouses for the supplies coming into the stricken city by sea in the weeks following the disaster.

In September 1906, the Buford was sent to rescue over 600 passengers and crew from the SS Mongolia, which had pierced her hull after running aground at Midway Island. Before Buford arrived on the scene, the Mongolia's crew had freed her. However, the two ship captains determined it prudent to send the passengers back on Buford. To ensure the safe arrival of Mongolia's crew, should the passenger steamer's bilge pumps fail to keep pace with the leaks, the Buford escorted her during the five-day return to Hawaii.

In 1907 and 1911, the Buford was involved in famine relief missions to China. In 1912–1916, she was involved in refugee and troop missions during the Mexican Revolution. With the outbreak of World War I in 1914, the Buford continued her refugee rescue work, bringing away Americans who wished to flee the European fighting. She supported the American war effort once the U.S. entered the conflict.

The Buford was in Galveston harbor when a massive hurricane hit on 17 August 1915, and was the city's sole line of communication to the outside world through her radio.

In December 1918, the Buford underwent another refit to prepare her for transporting American Expeditionary Force troops home from the war. On 14 January 1919, she was transferred to the U.S. Navy, commissioned as the USS Buford (ID 3818) the next day, and assigned to troop transport duty. During the next half-year, she made four round-trip voyages between the United States and France, bringing home over 4,700 soldiers. She made one more voyage to the Panama Canal Zone before she was decommissioned by the Navy on 2 September 1919, and returned to the Army Transport Service.

== Deportations ==
The Buford's most notorious incarnation followed a few months later when she was pressed into service as the "Soviet Ark" (or "Red Ark"). On 21 December 1919, she was used to deport 249 political radicals and other "undesirable" aliens, mostly members of the Union of Russian Workers, to the Russian SFSR. Also swept up were the fiery anarchists Emma Goldman and Alexander Berkman. This occurred between the first and second Palmer Raids of the first "Red Scare" period in the U.S. After delivering her charges, the Buford returned to New York on 22 February 1920.

=== Political context ===
During the First Red Scare in 1919–20, following the Russian Revolution, anti-Bolshevik sentiment quickly replaced the anti-German sentiment of the World War I years. Many politicians and government officials, along with a large part of the press and the public, feared an imminent attempt to overthrow the government of the United States and the creation of a new regime modeled on that of the Soviets. In that atmosphere of public hysteria, radical views as well as moderate dissents were often characterized as un-American or subversive, including the advocacy of labor rights and any less-than-complimentary discussion of American society and its system of government. Close ties between recent European immigrants and radical political ideas and organizations fed those anxieties as well.

In support of the total war effort in World War I, the Espionage Act of 1917 made it a crime to interfere with the operation or success of the armed forces of the United States. It effectively criminalized any act or speech that discouraged full compliance with the military draft. Convicted under this law, Eugene V. Debs, a socialist labor leader from Indiana and five-time presidential candidate, served three years of a 10-year sentence before President Warren G. Harding commuted his sentence on Christmas Day, 1921. The Immigration Act of 1918 denied entry into the U.S. and permitted the deportation of non-citizens "who disbelieve in or are opposed to organized government." Emma Goldman and Alexander Berkman, both anarchists and foreign born, were likewise convicted under the Espionage Act and deported.

=== Voyage ===
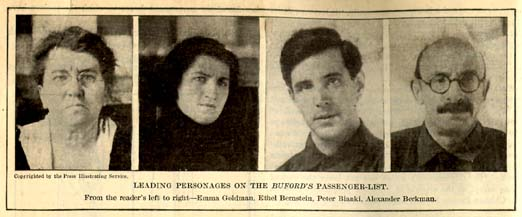
Leading Personages on the Buford's Passenger-List Emma Goldman, Ethel Bernstein, Peter Bianki, Alexander Berkman

The Buford steamed out of New York harbor at 6 am on Sunday, 21 December 1919, with 249 "undesirables" on board. Of those, 199 had been seized in the 7 November Palmer Raids. Some were leftists or anarchists, though perhaps as many as 180 were deported because of their membership in the Union of Russian Workers, an anarchist organization which served social and educational functions for many Russian immigrants, had been the principal target of the raids. Other deportees, including the well-known radical leaders Emma Goldman and Alexander Berkman, had been detained earlier. All, by act or speech or membership in an organization, fell within the legal definition of anarchist under the Immigration Act of 1918, which did not distinguish between "malignant conspirators and destructive revolutionists" on the one hand or "apostles of peace, preachers of the principle of non-resistance" on the other. All met the law's requirement in that they "believed that no government would be better for human society than any kind of government." Goldman had been convicted in 1893 of "inciting to riot" and in 1917 for interfering with military recruitment. She had been arrested on many other occasions. Berkman had served 14 years in prison for the attempted assassination of industrialist Henry Clay Frick after the Homestead Steel Strike in 1892. In 1917, he had been convicted alongside Goldman for the same anti-draft activities. The notoriety of Goldman and Berkman as convicted agitators allowed the press and public to imagine that all the deportees had similar backgrounds. The New York Times called them all "Russian Reds."

Not all the deportees were unhappy to be leaving the United States. Most were single, few were being separated from their families, and some anticipated a brighter future in the new Soviet Russia.

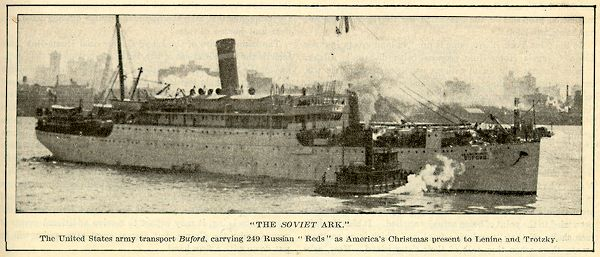
"THE SOVIET ARK" The United States army transport Buford, carrying 249 "Reds" as America's Christmas present to Lenine and Trotzky.

Twenty-four hours after its departure, the Buford's captain opened sealed orders to learn his projected destination. The captain only learned his final destination while in Kiel harbor while awaiting repairs and taking on a German pilot to guide the ship through the North Sea minefields, uncleared despite Germany's surrender a year earlier. The State Department had found it difficult to make arrangements to land in Latvia as originally planned. Though finally chosen, Finland was not an obvious choice, since Finland and Russia were then at war.

F.W. Berkshire, Supervising Inspector of Immigration, made the journey to oversee the enterprise and, in contrast to his two most famous charges, reported little conflict. A "strong detachment of marines" numbering 58 enlisted men and four officers also made the journey and pistols had been distributed to the crew.

In My Disillusionment in Russia, Emma Goldman wrote of the Buford voyage:

For twenty-eight days we were prisoners. Sentries at our cabin doors day and night, sentries on deck during the hour we were daily permitted to breathe the fresh air. Our men comrades were cooped up in dark, damp quarters, wretchedly fed, all of us in complete ignorance of the direction we were to take.

Alexander Berkman, in The Russian Tragedy, added,

We were prisoners, treated with military severity, and the Buford a leaky old tub repeatedly endangering our lives during the month's Odyssey... Long, long was the voyage, shameful the conditions we were forced to endure: crowded below deck, living in constant wetness and foul air, fed on the poorest rations.

On the evening of 9 January 1920, she arrived at Kiel and was docked for repairs. "It was not known how long the vessel will remain there, but her ultimate destination was reported to be either Libau or Riga."

The Buford reached Hanko, Finland, at 4:25 pm on Friday, 16 January 1920. The prisoners were kept between decks until they were landed the next day, Saturday, 17 January 1920, at 2 pm. They were taken off the transport and marched between a cordon of American Marines and Finnish White Guards to a special train that was to take them to Terijoki, Finland, about two miles (3 km) from the frontier. The 249 "undesirable aliens" were placed, 30 to a car, in [unheated] box cars fitted up with plank benches, tables and beds. Each car contained seven boxes of army rations. The supplies include bully beef, sugar and hard bread.

Finnish White Guards were stationed on each car platform. The party was to be completely isolated until it reached its destination. Once loaded, the train was then held overnight, while rumors of the party being killed as they crossed the border caused a diplomatic flurry.

The journey began the next day, 18 January, but the exiles were sidetracked at Viborg, Finland, remaining confined in their cars, while awaiting the British Prisoners' Relief Mission, which was to cross the Russian frontier at the same time. Delayed by storms, the Buford began her return voyage that same day.

On 19 January, the trek continued to Terijoki. Once the deportees had arrived, and after trudging through a heavy snowstorm, a parlay was conducted under white flags of truce between Berkman, guarded by the Finns, and the Russians, out on the ice of the frozen Systerbak River, which separated the Finnish and Bolshevist lines. Things being settled, the "undesirables" then crossed over into Russia at 2 pm, with Berkman and Goldman waiting until everyone else had safely crossed. All were enthusiastically received with cheers and a band playing the Russian national anthem. In the war-wrecked town of Bielo-Ostrov, which overlooked the stream, they boarded a waiting train which took them to Petrograd.

Most of the press approved enthusiastically of the Buford experiment. The Cleveland Plain Dealer wrote: "It is hoped and expected that other vessels, larger, more commodious, carrying similar cargoes, will follow in her wake."

== Later service ==
On 5 August 1920, the Buford returned the ashes of Puerto Rican patriot Dr. Ramon Emerterio Betances to San Juan.

On 2 May 1921, once again in the Pacific, the Buford rescued sixty-five passengers and crew from the inferno of the Japanese steam freighter Tokuyo Maru, which had caught fire and burned 60 miles (100 km) southwest of the mouth of the Columbia River, off Tillamook Head, Oregon.

In mid-1922, as one of her final duties as a U.S. transport, the Buford conducted an inspection tour of Northwestern and Alaska Army posts and closed a number of posts in the territory abandoned by the War Department.

In early 1923, the Buford was sold to John C. Ogden and Fred Linderman of the San Francisco-based Alaskan Siberian Navigation Company. On 20 July, the fledgling company steamed the Buford north with a delegation from the San Francisco Chamber of Commerce on board to explore the business opportunities of the Alaskan and Siberian markets. On their outward-bound stop in Seattle, a young, out-of-work, 25-year-old reporter joined the party, first as a passenger, then as part of the crew to earn his passage. His name was Elwyn Brooks White, later to become better known as E. B. White, an editor at The New Yorker and author of the children's classic Charlotte's Web.

In 1924, after a voyage to the South Seas, the Buford was chartered for three months by silent film comedian Buster Keaton for use as the principal set of his film The Navigator. The Buford had been "discovered" by Keaton's Technical Director Fred Gabourie while scouting for ships for another, outside project, The Sea Hawk. Released on 13 October 1924, The Navigator proved to be Keaton's most financially successful film and one of his personal favorites. After this moment in the limelight, the Buford slipped into dormancy and would occasionally reappear at the center of several financially dubious schemes.

On 25 February 1929, it was reported that the Buford would be scrapped in Yokohama, Japan by Hasegawa Gentaro. She sailed from Los Angeles on 11 May 1929, flying the American flag under the command of Capt. A. G. Laur to meet her final fate.
