= Mother Earth (magazine) =

American anarchist periodical

- Mother Earth Vol 7 No. 4, cover dated June 1912
- Proprietor: Emma Goldman
- Staff writers: Alexander Berkman
- Categories: Anarchism
- Frequency: 12 monthly
- First issue: March 1906
- Final issue Number: August 1917; Vol 12 No 6
- Country: United States
- Language: English

Mother Earth was an American anarchist journal that described itself as "A Monthly Magazine Devoted to Social Science and Literature". Founded in early 1906 and initially edited by Emma Goldman, an activist in the United States, it published articles by contemporary activists and writers in Europe as well as the US, in addition to essays by historic figures.

== History ==
Emma Goldman, a noted political activist in the United States, was the first editor of this magazine, which she founded in early 1906. She wanted an alternative means to reach people, as she was tired of her rounds of cross-country speaking tours. Alexander Berkman, another well-known anarchist and longtime friend, took over as editor in 1907, a year after he was released from prison. He served in this role to 1915. It published longer articles by American and European writers and activists on a variety of anarchist topics, including the labor movement, education, literature and the arts, state and government control, and women's emancipation, and sexual freedom. It was an early supporter of birth control. Its subscribers and supporters formed a virtual "who's who" of the radical left in the United States in the years prior to 1920. One of its traveling sellers was a friend of Goldman and Mother Earth circles, Eva Kotchever, who founded later the famous speakeasy Eve's Hangout in New York.

In 1917, Mother Earth began to call for opposition to US entry into the Great War and, specifically, for men to refuse to register for the military draft or submit to conscription. On June 15, 1917, Congress passed the Espionage Act. The law set punishments for acts of interference in US foreign policy and espionage. The Act authorized stiff fines and prison terms of up to 20 years for anyone who obstructed the military draft or encouraged "disloyalty" to the U.S. government. After Goldman and Berkman continued to advocate against conscription, Goldman's offices at Mother Earth were thoroughly searched by Department of Justice agents, and they seized volumes of files and detailed subscription lists from Mother Earth, along with Berkman's journal The Blast.

A US Justice Department press release said:

A wagon load of anarchist records and propaganda material was seized, and included in the lot is what is believed to be a complete registry of anarchy's friends in the United States. A splendidly kept card index was found, which the Federal agents believe will greatly simplify their task of identifying persons mentioned in the various record books and papers. The subscription lists of Mother Earth and The Blast, which contain 10,000 names, were also seized.

Mother Earth remained in monthly circulation until August 1917. Berkman and Goldman were found guilty of violating the Espionage Act because they encouraged men to resist the draft. The court had revoked Goldman's citizenship after that of her husband, Kershner, had been revoked. Along with 258 others, Goldman and Berkman were deported to the Soviet Union on a single ship (USAT Buford) in 1919.

== Contributors ==
The following is a partial list of contemporary contributors whose essays or poems were published in Mother Earth:

- Leonard D. Abbott
- Margaret Caroline Anderson
- Max Baginski
- Alexander Berkman
- Maxwell Bodenheim
- Bayard Boyesen
- Georg Brandes
- Louise Bryant
- Voltairine de Cleyre
- John R. Coryell
- Julia May Courtney
- Padraic Colum
- Floyd Dell
- Mabel Dodge
- Will Durant
- Francisco Ferrer Guardia
- Ricardo Flores Magón
- William Z. Foster
- Emma Goldman
- Maxim Gorky (translated by Alice Stone Blackwell and S. Persky)
- Margaret Grant (was the pseudonym of John R. Coryell)
- Martha Gruening
- Bolton Hall
- Sadakichi Hartmann
- Cassius Cook
- Hippolyte Havel
- Ben Hecht
- Robert Henri
- C. L. James
- Harry Kelly
- Harry Kemp
- Peter Kropotkin
- Errico Malatesta
- Max Nettlau
- Eugene O'Neill (unsigned)
- Robert Allerton Parker
- Charles Robert Plunkett
- Robert Lonzo
- Pierre Ramus
- Élisée Reclus
- Ben Reitman
- Lola Ridge
- Rudolf Rocker
- Morris Rosenfeld
- Margaret Sanger
- Theodore Schroeder
- Leo Tolstoy
- Ross Winn
- Adolf Wolff
- Charles Erskine Scott Wood

The following is a partial list of contributors of cover art:

- Jules-Félix Grandjouan
- Manuel Komroff
- Robert Minor
- Man Ray
- Adolf Wolff
