= Rebel in Paradise: A Biography of Emma Goldman =

1961 biography by Richard Drinnon

- Author: Richard Drinnon
- Publisher: University of Chicago Press
- Publication date: 1961
- Pages: 349
- OCLC: 266217

Rebel in Paradise: A Biography of Emma Goldman is a 1961 biography of Emma Goldman by historian Richard Drinnon.

== Bibliography ==
- Bremner, Robert H. (1962). "Review of Rebel in Paradise: A Biography of Emma Goldman". The Journal of Southern History. 28 (3): 377–379. doi:10.2307/2205328. ISSN 0022-4642. JSTOR 2205328.
- Laidler, Harry W. (1962). "Review of Rebel in Paradise: A Biography of Emma Goldman". Political Science Quarterly. 77 (2): 289–290. doi:10.2307/2145887. ISSN 0032-3195. JSTOR 2145887.
- Murray, Robert K. (1962). "Review of Rebel in Paradise: A Biography of Emma Goldman". The Mississippi Valley Historical Review. 49 (1): 158–160. doi:10.2307/1889512. ISSN 0161-391X. JSTOR 1889512.
- Rischin, Moses (1963). "Review of Rebel in Paradise: A Biography of Emma Goldman". American Jewish Historical Quarterly. 53 (1): 85–86. ISSN 0002-9068. JSTOR 23873757.
- Shaw, Francis H. (1964). "The Trials of Emma Goldman, Anarchist". The Review of Politics. 26 (3): 444–445. doi:10.1017/S0034670500005210. ISSN 0034-6705. JSTOR 1405245. S2CID 143738107.
- Thomas, Norman (1962). "Review of Rebel in Paradise: A Biography of Emma Goldman". The Annals of the American Academy of Political and Social Science. 340: 145–146. doi:10.1177/000271626234000138. ISSN 0002-7162. JSTOR 1033730. S2CID 148944066.
- Watson, James E. (1962). "Review of Rebel in Paradise, Biography of Emma Goldman". The Western Political Quarterly. 15 (4): 742–743. doi:10.2307/445559. ISSN 0043-4078. JSTOR 445559.
- Wiebe, Robert (1962). "Review of Rebel in Paradise: A Biography of Emma Goldman". The Wisconsin Magazine of History. 45 (3): 218–219. ISSN 0043-6534. JSTOR 4633756.
