= My Disillusionment in Russia =

1923 book by Emma Goldman

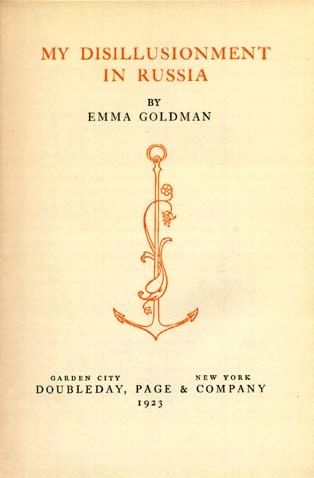
- Author: Emma Goldman
- Language: English
- Subject: Soviet Russia
- Publisher: Doubleday, Page & Company
- Publication date: 1923
- Publication place: United States
- OCLC: 476073
- Text: My Disillusionment in Russia at Wikisource

My Disillusionment in Russia is a book by Emma Goldman, published in 1923 by Doubleday, Page & Co. The book was based on a much longer manuscript entitled "My Two Years in Russia", which was an eyewitness account of events in Russia from 1920 to 1921 that ensued in the wake of the Russian Revolution of 1917 and which culminated in the Kronstadt rebellion. Long concerned about developments with the Bolsheviks, Goldman described the rebellion as the "final wrench. I saw before me the Bolshevik State, formidable, crushing every constructive revolutionary effort, suppressing, debasing, and disintegrating everything."

Much to Goldman's dismay, only upon receiving the first printed copies of the book she became aware that (1) the publisher had changed the title; and (2) the last twelve chapters were entirely missing, including an afterword, which Goldman felt was "the most vital part" of the book. Sympathetic to the February Revolution, the complete book is an impassioned left critique of the subsequent Bolshevik Revolution, as well as Vladimir Lenin's New Economic Policy—an "all-powerful, centralized Government with State Capitalism as its economic expression". The complete book is also critical of Marxist theory, which Goldman describes as "a cold, mechanistic, enslaving formula".

After much back and forth with the publishers, the missing portions of Goldman's original manuscript were published in a second American volume My Further Disillusionment in Russia (also titled by the publisher) in 1924. In the preface to the second volume of the American edition, Goldman wryly observes that only two of the reviewers sensed the incompleteness of the original American version, one of whom was not a regular critic but a librarian. A complete version of the full manuscript was published in England with an introduction by Rebecca West, also under the title My Disillusionment in Russia (London: C. W. Daniel Company, 1925).
