= History of education in the United States =

The history of education in the United States covers the trends in formal education in America from the 17th century to the early 21st century.

== Colonial era ==
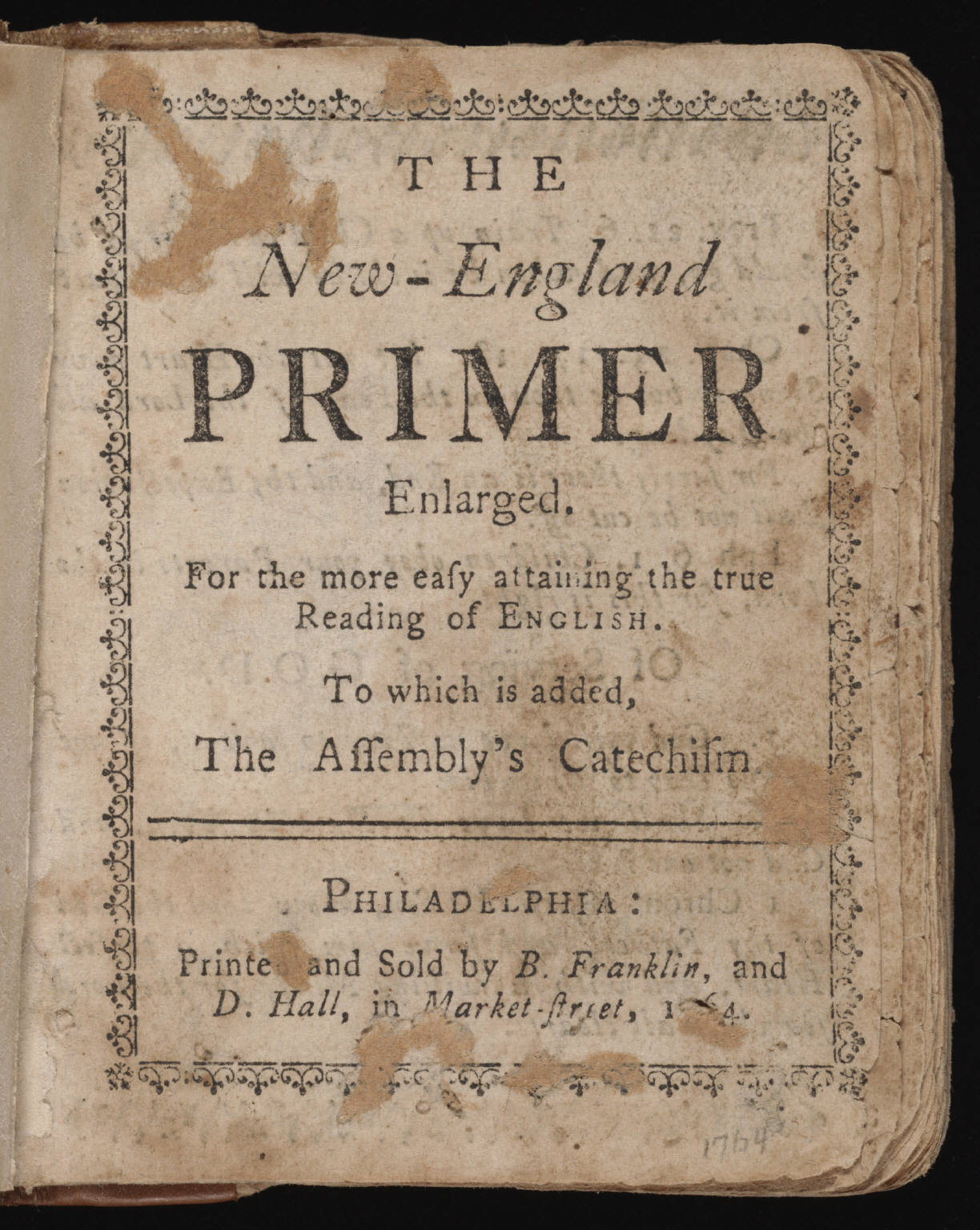
The New England Primer was the first reading primer designed for the American colonies. It became the most successful educational textbook published in the 17th-century colonies and it became the foundation of most schooling before the 1790s.

Schooling was a high priority in Puritan New England, which set up strong systems, especially in the colonial-era Province of Massachusetts Bay. It was a lower priority elsewhere, with many short-lived small local private academies and some schools for pauper children.

By 1775 Americans were among the most literate people in the world. They kept posted on political events and ideas thanks to 35 weekly newspapers in the 13 colonies, with 40,000 subscribers.

=== New England ===
The Puritans in the New England colonies strongly supported education. The aim of Puritan instruction was for children to be able to read and interpret the Bible for themselves without the need for the exegesis and interpretation of clergy.

The first American schools in the Thirteen Colonies opened in the 17th century. The first public schools in America were established by the Puritans in New England during the 17th century. Boston Latin School was founded in 1635. Boston Latin School was not funded by tax dollars in its early days, however. On January 1, 1644, by unanimous vote, Dedham, Massachusetts authorized the first U.S. taxpayer-funded public school; "the seed of American education."

The Puritan colonists tried at first to educate by the traditional English methods of family, church, community, and apprenticeship, with schools later becoming the key agent in socialization. At first, the rudiments of literacy and arithmetic were taught inside the family, assuming the parents had those skills. Literacy rates were much higher in New England because much of the population had been deeply involved in the Protestant Reformation and learned to read in order to read the Scriptures.

By the mid-19th century, the role of the schools in New England had expanded to such an extent that they took over many of the educational tasks traditionally handled by parents.

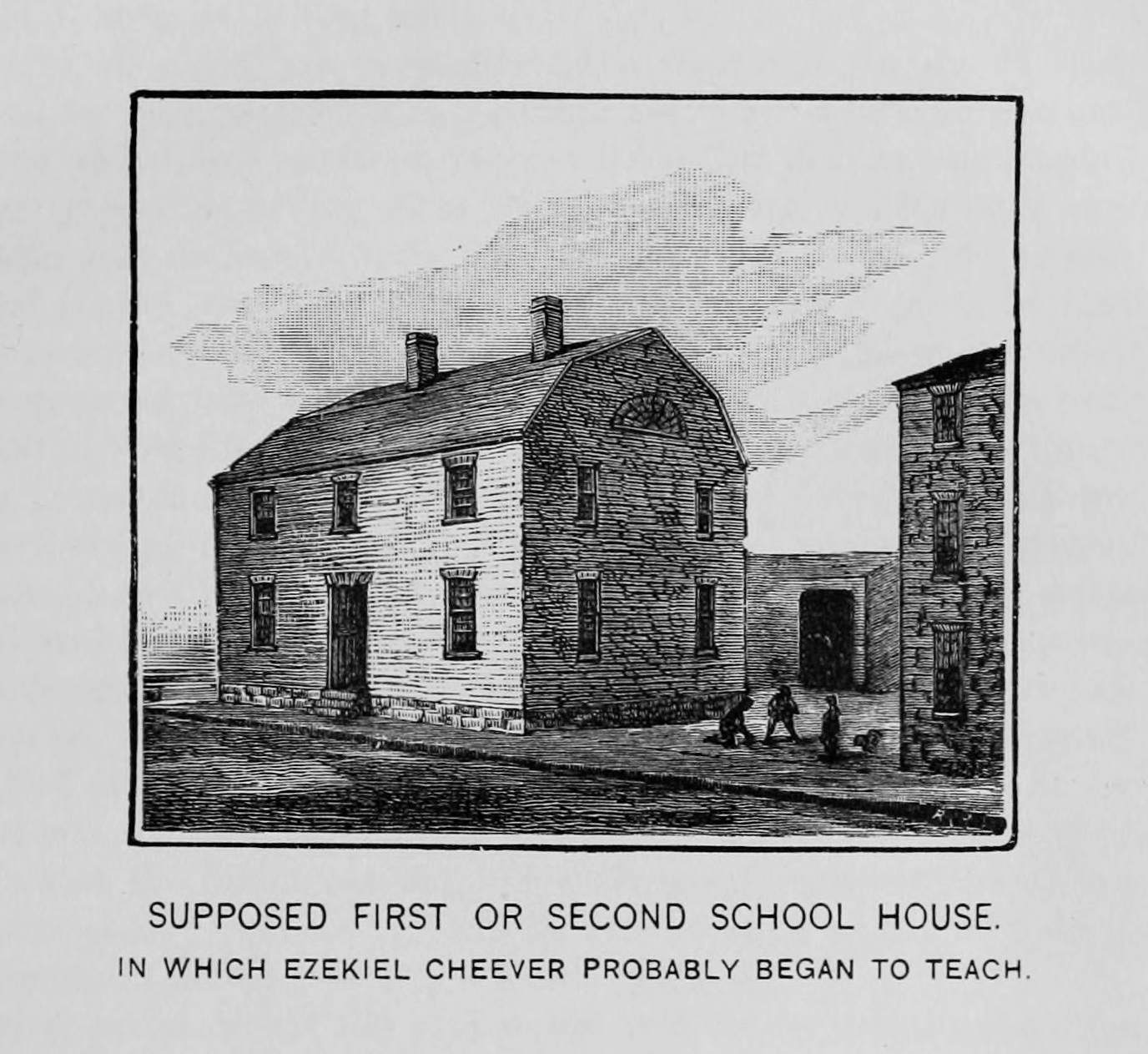
Early Boston Latin School building

All the New England colonies required towns to set up schools, and many did so. In 1642 the Massachusetts Bay Colony made "proper" education compulsory; other New England colonies followed this example. Similar statutes were adopted in other colonies in the 1640s and 1650s. In the 18th century, "common schools" were established; students of all ages were under the control of one teacher in one room. Although they were publicly supplied at the local (town) level, they were not free. Students' families were charged tuition or "rate bills." Literacy rates are disputed, but one estimate is that at the end of the Colonial era about 80% of males and 50% of females were "fully literate," i.e., able to both read and sign their names. Historian David McCullough has said that the literacy rate in Massachusetts was higher in colonial times than it is today.

The larger towns in New England opened grammar schools, the forerunner of the modern high school. The most famous was the Boston Latin School, which is still in operation as a public high school. As its name implies, the purpose of Boston Latin, and similar later schools, was to teach Latin (and Greek), which were required for admission to Harvard College and other Colonial colleges. Hopkins School in New Haven, Connecticut, was another. By the 1780s, most had been replaced by private academies. By the early 19th century New England operated a network of private high schools, now called "prep schools," typified by Phillips Andover Academy (1778), Phillips Exeter Academy (1781), Hopkins School 1660, and Deerfield Academy (1797). They became the major feeders for Ivy League colleges in the mid-19th century. These prep schools became coeducational in the 1970s, and remain highly prestigious in the 21st century—and as expensive as the elite colleges they feed.

Jackson Turner Main finds that teaching in colonial New England was a poorly paid, part-time, temporary job. Young men typically moved on to more secure occupations as soon as possible.

Puritanism required a well-educated ministry, and Harvard (founded in 1636) and Yale (founded in 1701) provided the men. Of the 2,466 graduates of the two schools from 1691 to 1760, 987 (40%) became ministers. However the salaries were low, and increasingly ministers were unable to send their own sons to college.

=== South ===
Residents of the Upper South, centered on the Chesapeake Bay, created some basic schools early in the colonial period. Generally the planter class hired tutors for the education of their children or sent them to private schools. During the colonial years, some sent their sons to England or Scotland for schooling.

In March 1620, George Thorpe became a deputy in charge of 10,000 acres (4,000 ha) of land to be set aside for a university and Indian school. The plans for the school for Native Americans ended when George Thorpe was killed in the Indian massacre of 1622. In Virginia, rudimentary schooling for the poor and paupers was provided by the local parish. Most elite parents either home schooled their children using peripatetic tutors or sent them to small local private schools.

The Church of England sponsored the Society for the Propagation of the Gospel in Foreign Parts (SPG) in 1701. In the colonial era, it was the most active Church missionary organization, with 170 missionary stations oriented toward Native Americans, and white backcountry pioneers. It hired 98 teachers for the children of parishioners, as well as children of poor whites. They focused on the principles of religion and the three Rs. The SPG was expelled from Virginia in 1776. Dissenting Protestants, especially Moravians, Quakers, and Presbyterians operated schools in the south.

In late 17th-century Maryland, the Jesuits operated some schools for Catholic students.

In the deep south (Georgia and South Carolina), schooling was carried out primarily by private venture teachers, in "old field schools, and in a hodgepodge of publicly funded projects. In the colony of Georgia, at least ten grammar schools were in operation by 1770, many taught by ministers. Dozens of private tutors and teachers advertised their service in newspapers. A study of women's signatures indicates a high degree of literacy in areas with schools. In South Carolina, scores of school projects were advertised in the South Carolina Gazette beginning in 1732. Although it is difficult to know how many ads yielded successful schools, many of the ventures advertised repeatedly over years, suggesting continuity. Generally, however, literacy rates were lower in the South than in New England.

=== Women and girls ===
The earliest continually operating school for girls in the United States is the Catholic Ursuline Academy in New Orleans, founded in 1727 by the Sisters of the Order of Saint Ursula, the first convent established in the US. The academy graduated the first female pharmacist. This was the first free school and first retreat center for young women. It was the first school to teach free women of color, Native Americans, and enslaved women. In the region, Ursuline provided the first center of social welfare in the Mississippi Valley; and it was the first boarding school for girls in Louisiana, and the first school of music in New Orleans.

Tax-supported schooling for girls began as early as 1767 in New England. It was optional and some towns proved reluctant to support this innovation. Moreover, statutes creating town schools for "children" often were interpreted in practice as encompassing only boys. Northampton, Massachusetts, for example, was a late adopter because it had many rich families who dominated the political and social structures. They did not want to pay taxes to aid poor families. Northampton assessed taxes on all households, rather than only on those with children, and used the funds to support a grammar school to prepare boys for college. Not until after 1800 did Northampton educate girls with public money. In contrast, the town of Sutton, Massachusetts, was diverse in terms of social leadership and religion at an early point in its history. Sutton paid for its schools by means of taxes on households with children only, thereby creating an active constituency in favor of universal education for both boys and girls.

Historians note that reading and writing were different skills in the colonial era. Schools taught both, but in places without schools, writing was taught mainly to boys and a few privileged girls. Men handled worldly affairs and needed to both read and write. It was believed that girls needed only to read (especially religious materials). This educational disparity between reading and writing explains why the colonial women often could read, but could not write and could not sign their names—they used an "X".

After 1740, the education of elite women in Philadelphia followed the British model developed by the gentry classes during the early 18th century. Rather than emphasizing ornamental aspects of women's roles, this new model encouraged women to engage in more substantive education, reaching into the classical arts and sciences to improve their reasoning skills. The education of girls in the Colonial era differed among the various colonies according to the religious and cultural practices the colonists brought with them from their countries of origin. The Central colonies (N.Y., Pennsylvania, Delaware, and New Jersey), for instance, more often offered elementary education to girls than did those of New England and the South. The Dutch Protestants of New Netherland even operated coeducational schools at the elementary level. Education had the capacity to help colonial women secure their elite status by giving them traits that their 'inferiors' could not easily mimic. Fatherly (2004) examines British and American writings that influenced Philadelphia during the 1740s–1770s and the ways in which Philadelphia women gained education and demonstrated their status.

At the end of the colonial era, Noah Webster, Benjamin Rush, and others used the educational theories of Jean-Jacques Rousseau to argue for the civic necessity of broad-based female education. Webster, in particular, started including a significant volume of content intended for girls in his best-selling schoolbooks.

=== Non-English schools ===
By 1664, when the territory was taken over by the English, most towns in the New Netherland colony had already set up elementary schools. The schools were closely related to the Dutch Reformed Church, and emphasized reading for religious instruction and prayer. The English closed the Dutch-language public schools; in some cases these were converted into private academies. The new English government showed little interest in public schools.

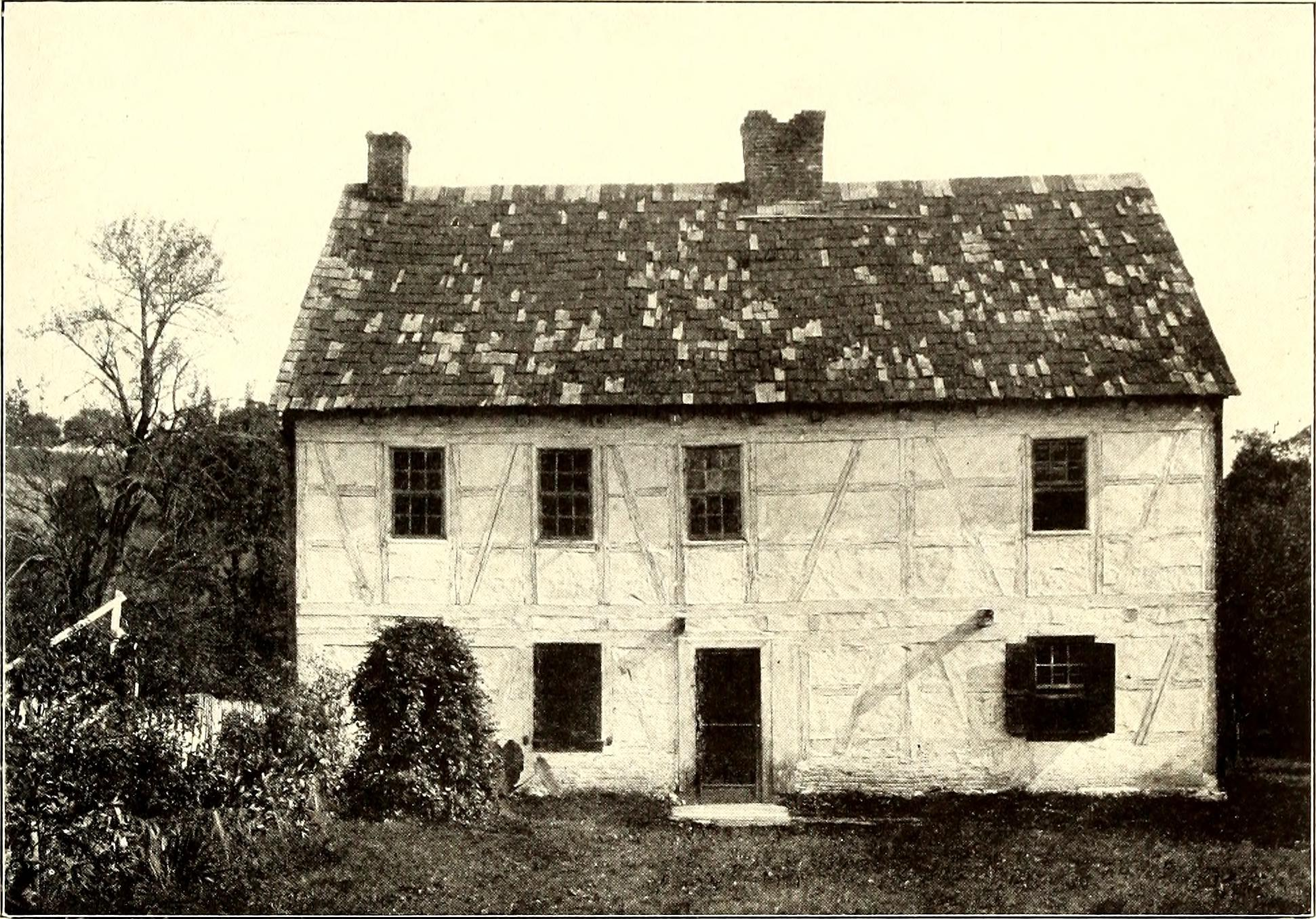
A Moravian school in Oley Township, Pennsylvania, built by German settlers in 1743

German settlements from New York through Pennsylvania, Maryland and down to the Carolinas sponsored elementary schools closely tied to their churches, with each denomination or sect sponsoring its own schools. In the early colonial years, German immigrants were Protestant and the drive for education was related to teaching students to read Scripture.

Following waves of German immigration after the 1848 revolutions, and after the end of the American Civil War, both Catholics and Missouri Synod Lutherans began to set up their own German-language parochial schools, especially in their urban strongholds of Cincinnati, St. Louis, Chicago and Milwaukee, as well as Midwestern rural areas. Most German American schools and churches switched to English when the U.S. declared war on Germany in 1917. Public schools almost all dropped courses in German for English speakers.

Spain had small settlements in Florida, the Southwest, and also controlled Louisiana. Parish schools were administered were limited to male students.

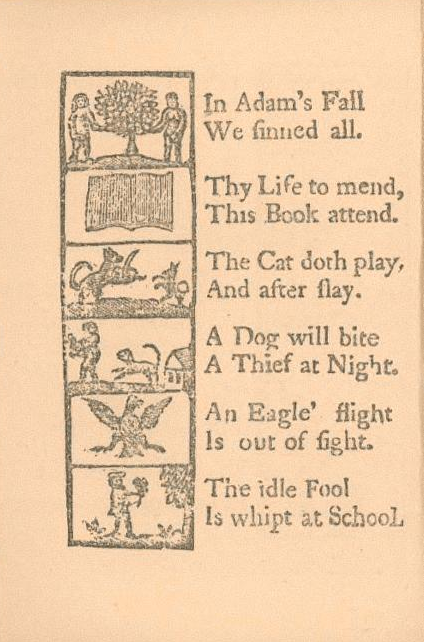
Excerpt from The New England Primer of 1690, the most popular American textbook of the 18th century

=== Textbooks/Workbooks ===
In the 17th century, colonists imported schoolbooks from England. By 1690, Boston publishers were reprinting the English Protestant Tutor under the title of The New England Primer. The Primer was built on rote memorization. By simplifying Calvinist theology, the Primer enabled the Puritan child to define the limits of the self by relating his life to the authority of God and his parents. The Primer included additional material that made it widely popular in colonial schools until it was supplanted by Webster's work. The "blue backed speller" of Noah Webster was by far the most common textbook from the 1790s until 1836, when the McGuffey Readers appeared. Both series emphasized civic duty and morality, and sold tens of millions of copies nationwide.

Webster's Speller was the pedagogical blueprint for American textbooks; it was so arranged that it could be easily taught to students, and it progressed by age. Webster believed students learned most readily when complex problems were broken into its component parts. Each pupil could master one part before moving to the next. Ellis argues that Webster anticipated some of the insights associated in the 20th century with Jean Piaget's theory of cognitive development. Webster said that children pass through distinctive learning phases in which they master increasingly complex or abstract tasks. He stressed that teachers should not try to teach a three-year-old how to read—wait until they are ready at age five. He planned the Speller accordingly, starting with the alphabet, then covering the different sounds of vowels and consonants, then syllables; simple words came next, followed by more complex words, then sentences. Webster's Speller was more secular than its predecessors. It ended with two pages of important dates in American history, beginning with Columbus' "discovery" in 1492 and ending with the Battle of Yorktown in 1781, by which the United States achieved independence. As Ellis explains, "Webster began to construct a secular catechism to the nation-state. Here was the first appearance of 'civics' in American schoolbooks. In this sense, Webster's speller was the secular successor to The New England Primer with its explicitly biblical injunctions." Webster believed that a nation's linguistic forms and the thoughts correlated with them shaped individuals' behavior. He intended the etymological clarification and reform of American English to improve citizens' manners and thereby preserve republican purity and social stability. Webster animated his Speller and Grammar by following these principles.

The final part in Webster's system was a Reader, initially published in 1785. It was designed to uplift the mind and "diffuse the principles of virtue and patriotism." Students received the usual quota of Plutarch, Shakespeare, Swift, and Addison, as well as such Americans as Joel Barlow's Vision of Columbus, Timothy Dwight's Conquest of Canaan, and John Trumbull's poem M'Fingal.

=== Colonial colleges ===
Map of the nine colonial colleges

Higher education was largely oriented toward training men as ministers before 1800. Doctors and lawyers were trained in local apprentice systems.

Religious denominations established most early colleges in order to train ministers. New England had a long emphasis on literacy in order that individuals could read the Bible. Harvard College was founded by the colonial legislature in 1636, and named after an early benefactor. Most of the funding came from the colony, but the college began to build an endowment from its early years. Harvard at first focused on training young men for the ministry, but many alumni went into law, medicine, government or business. The college was a leader in bringing Newtonian science to the colonies. Harvard also established the Harvard Indian College, "hoping to make it the Indian Oxford," but only four Native Americans ever enrolled at Harvard in that era, and only one graduated.

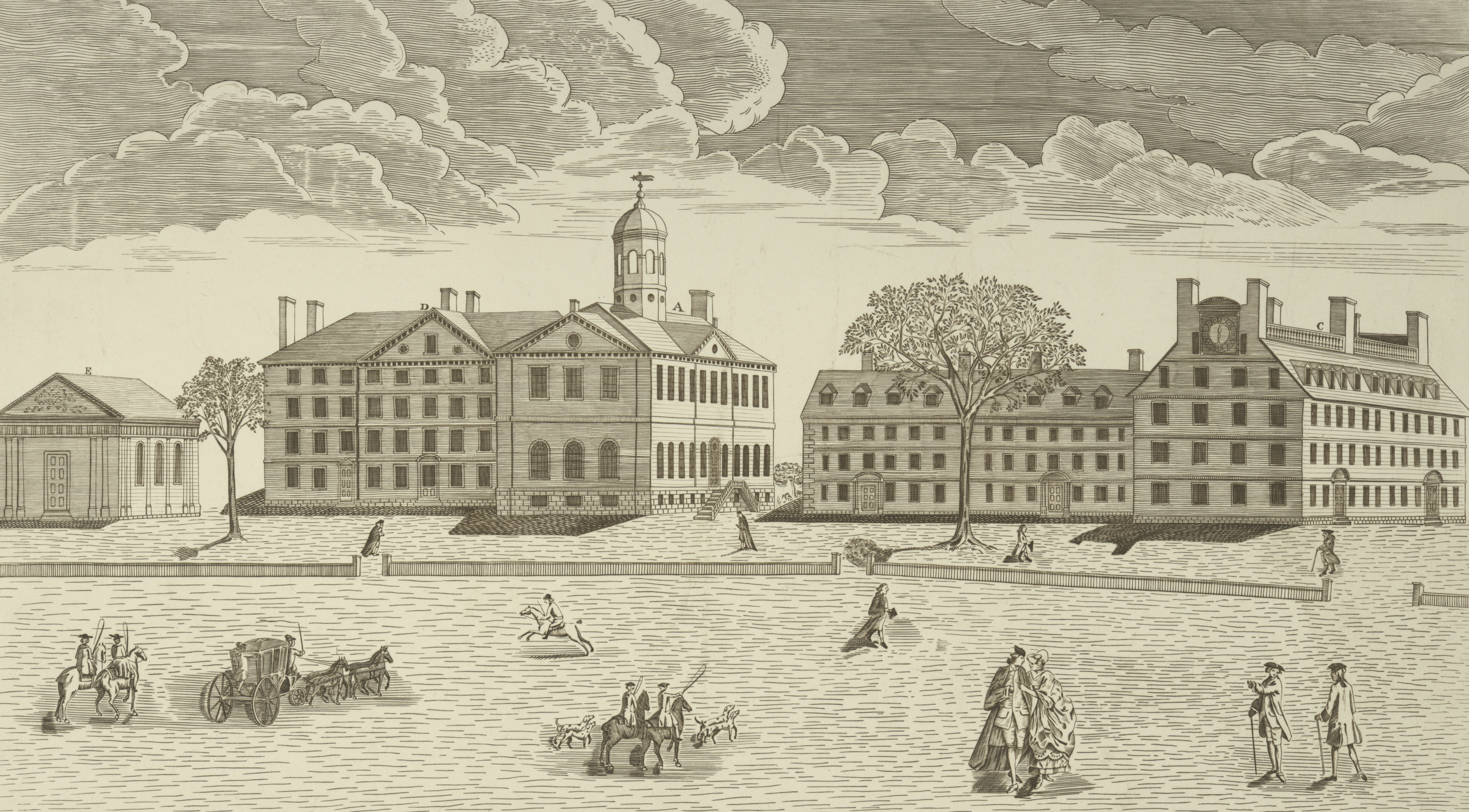
A 1768 depiction of Harvard College engraved by Paul Revere

The College of William & Mary was founded by Virginia government in 1693, with 20,000 acres (8,100 ha) of land for an endowment, and a penny tax on every pound of tobacco, together with an annual appropriation. It was closely associated with the established Anglican Church. James Blair, the leading Anglican minister in the colony, was president for 50 years. The college won the broad support of the Virginia planter class, most of whom were Anglicans. It hired the first law professor and trained many of the lawyers, politicians, and leading planters. Students headed for the ministry were given free tuition. William and Mary's charter included among its purposes the education of Indian children, so it created an Indian School, the main goal of which was to make the students literate enough to become missionaries to their peoples.

Yale College was founded by Puritans in 1701. The conservative Puritan ministers of Connecticut had grown dissatisfied with the more liberal theology of Harvard, and wanted their own school to train orthodox ministers. However president Thomas Clap strengthened the curriculum in the natural sciences and made Yale a stronghold of revivalist New Light theology.

New Side Presbyterians in 1747 set up the College of New Jersey, in the town of Princeton; much later it was renamed as Princeton University. Baptists established Rhode Island College in 1764, and in 1804 it was renamed Brown University in honor of a benefactor. Brown was especially liberal in welcoming young men from other denominations.

In New York City, the Anglicans set up Kings College in 1746, with its president Samuel Johnson the only teacher. It closed during the American Revolution, and reopened in 1784 as an independent institution under the name of Columbia College; it is now Columbia University.

The Academy of Philadelphia was created in 1749 by Benjamin Franklin and other civic minded leaders in Philadelphia. Unlike colleges in other cities, it was not oriented toward the training of ministers. It founded the first medical school in America in 1765, therefore becoming America's first university. The Pennsylvania state legislature conferred a new corporate charter upon the College of Philadelphia and renamed it the University of Pennsylvania in 1791.

The Dutch Reformed Church in 1766 set up Queens College in New Jersey, which later became known as Rutgers University and gained state support. Dartmouth College, chartered in 1769 as a school for Native Americans, relocated to its present site in Hanover, New Hampshire, in 1770.

All of the schools were small, with a limited undergraduate curriculum oriented on the classical liberal arts. Because they were expected to become members of the governing class, Harvard applicants were required before entering to "readily make and speak or write true Latin prose and [have] skill in making verse and [be] competently grounded in the Greek language . . ." and the other Colonial colleges followed Harvard. Students were drilled in Greek, Latin, geometry, ancient history, logic, ethics, and rhetoric, with few discussions, little homework, and no lab sessions. The college president typically tried to enforce strict discipline. Many students were younger than 17, and most of the colleges also operated a preparatory school. There were no organized sports, or Greek-letter fraternities, but many of the schools had active literary societies. Tuition was very low and scholarships were few. Thirty-six of the eighty-nine men who signed both the Declaration of Independence and participated in the Constitutional Convention attended a Colonial college. Therefore, the Founders shared common cultural references and values regardless of which colony they were raised in.

The colonies had no schools of law. A few young American students studied at the prestigious Inns of Court in London. The majority of aspiring lawyers served apprenticeships with established American lawyers, or "read the law" to qualify for bar exams. Law became very well established in the colonies, compared to medicine, which was in a rudimentary condition. In the 18th century, 117 Americans had graduated in medicine in Edinburgh, Scotland, but most physicians learned as apprentices in the colonies.

The trustees of the Academy of Philadelphia, later the University of Pennsylvania, established the first medical school in the colonies in 1765, becoming the first university in the colonies. In New York, the medical department of King's College was established in 1767, and in 1770 it was awarded the first American M.D. degree.

== 19th century ==
The whole people must take upon themselves the education of the whole people and be willing to bear the expenses of it. There should not be a district of one mile square, without a school in it, not founded by a charitable individual, but maintained at the public expense of the people themselves.

— John Adams, U.S. President, 1785

After the Revolution, northern states especially emphasized education and rapidly established public schools. By the year 1870, all states had tax-subsidized elementary schools. The US population had one of the highest literacy rates in the world at the time. Private academies also flourished in the towns across the country, but rural areas (where most people lived) had few schools before the 1880s.

In 1821, Boston started the first public high school in the United States. By the close of the 19th century, public secondary schools began to outnumber private ones.

Over the years, Americans have been influenced by a number of European reformers; among them Pestalozzi, Herbart, and Montessori.

=== Academies ===
In the nineteenth century an academy was what later became known as a high school; in most places in the U.S. there were no public schools above the primary level. Some older high schools, such as Hopkins Academy, retain the term in their names. In 1753, Benjamin Franklin established the academy and Charitable School of the Province of Pennsylvania. In 1755, it was renamed the college and Academy and Charitable School of Philadelphia. Today, it is known as the University of Pennsylvania.

The academy movement in the US in the early nineteenth century arose from a public sense that education in the classic disciplines needed to be extended into the new territories and states that were being formed in the new western states. Thousands of academies were started using local funds and tuition; most closed after a few years and others were established. In 1860 there were 6,415 academies in operation. When the Civil War erupted in 1861 they generally closed down temporarily; most in the South never reopened.

A number of colleges began as (high school) academies, then became a college by adding post-secondary unit, and then finally dropped the pre-collegiate academy. Several colleges were indirectly influenced by the academy model, including Brown University in Rhode Island and Dartmouth College in New Hampshire.

By 1840, 3,204 academies and similar secondary schools were in operation. Most lasted only a few years but others were created and by 1860 6,415 were in operation nationwide. The first public secondary schools started around the 1830s and 40s within the wealthier areas of similar income levels and greatly expanded after 1865 into the 1890s.

Number of academies and secondary schools in operation, 1840–1860, by region
Region	1840	1850	1860
New England	630	985	988
Middle Atlantic	861	1,626	1,648
South Atlantic	969	1,366	1,515
Southwest	560	1,371	1,361
West	184	550	903
Total USA	3,204	5,898	6,415

High school enrollment increased when schools at this level became free tuition, laws required teenagers to attend until a certain age, and it was believed that every American student had the opportunity to participate regardless of their ability.

- Opal, J. M. "Exciting Emulation: Academies and the Transformation of the Rural North, 1780s–1820s." Journal of American History 91#2 (2004), pp. 445–70. doi:10.2307/3660707

==== Military academies ====
An American innovation was the military academy. These were private high schools for men featuring ranks, drills and uniforms copied after the US Military Academy at West Point. They were not supported by the national government, but some were sponsored by state or local governments. Graduates had no obligation to enter the military. Norwich University, founded by Alden Partridge under the name "American Literary, Scientific and Military Academy" was the first one. Opened in Vermont in 1819, it is still in operation. Patridge established a number of these academies, and others were copied after his model. Most closed after a few years. Famous military academies that became universities include Virginia Military Institute (VMI) set up by the Virginia state government in 1839, and The Citadel in Charleston, South Carolina, set up by the state government in 1843.

==== Female academies ====
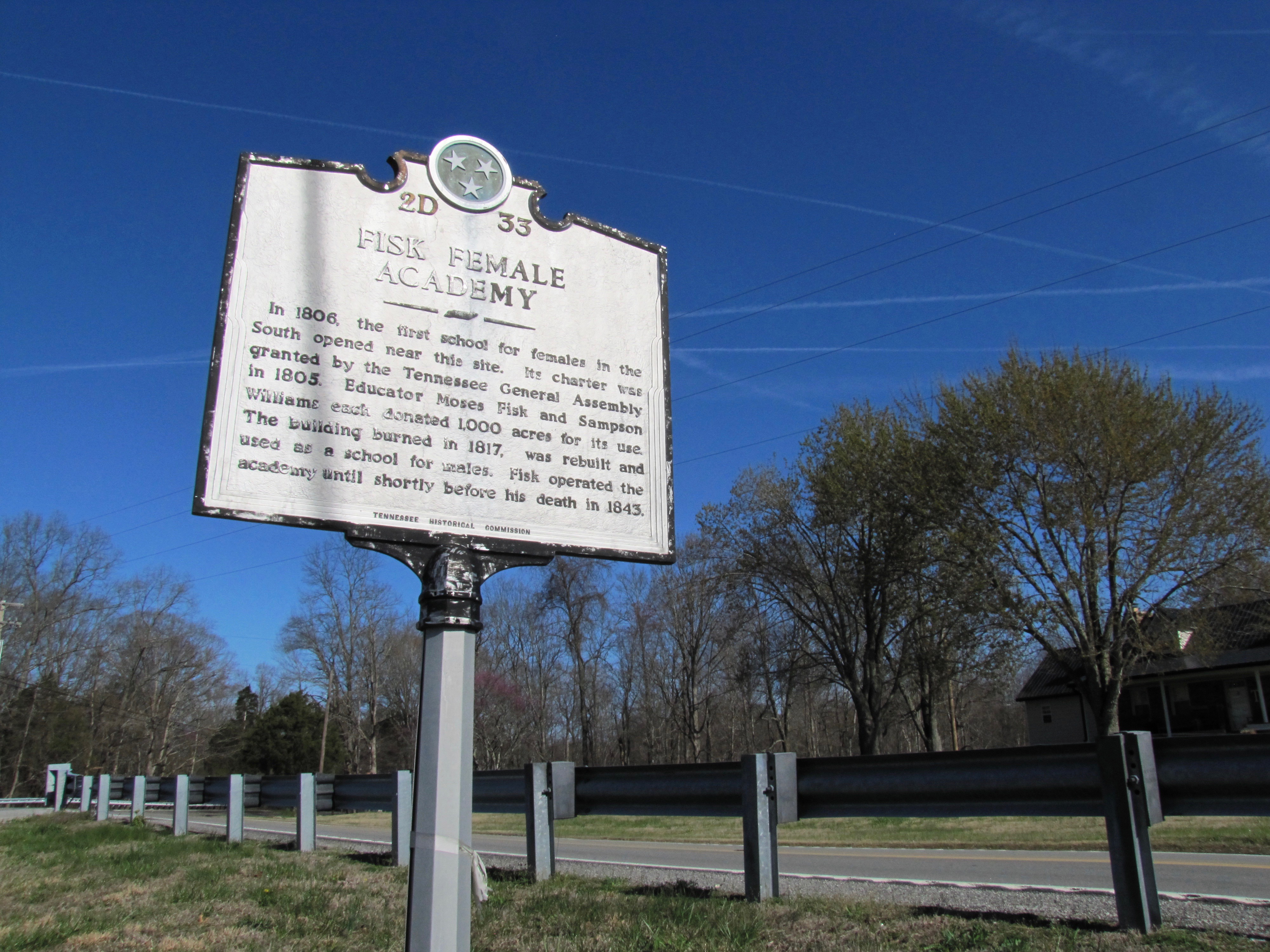
A historical marker in Hilham, Tennessee identifying the former location of Fisk Female Academy, a female academy founded in 1806

By the 1840s, New England writers such as Lydia Maria Child, Catharine Maria Sedgwick, and Lydia Sigourney became respected models and advocates for improving and expanding education for females. Greater educational access meant formerly male-only subjects, such as mathematics and philosophy, were to be integral to curricula at public and private schools for girls. By the late 19th century, these institutions were extending and reinforcing the tradition of women as educators and supervisors of American moral and ethical values. The relative emphasis on decorative arts and refinement of female instruction which had characterized the colonial era was replaced after 1776 by a program to support women in education for their major role in nation building, in order that they become good republican mothers of good republican youth. Fostered by community spirit and financial donations, private female academies were established in towns across the South as well as the North.

About 200 private female academies and seminaries at the high school level were established in the United States between 1790 and 1830. Rich planters were particularly insistent on having their daughters schooled, since education often served as a substitute for dowry in marriage arrangements. The academies usually provided a rigorous and broad curriculum that stressed writing, penmanship, arithmetic, and languages, especially French. By 1840, the female academies succeeded in producing a cultivated, well-read female elite ready for their roles as wives and mothers in southern aristocratic society.

Emma Willard was a New York educator and writer who dedicated her life to women's education. She founded the first school for women's higher education, the Troy Female Seminary in Troy, New York, which is now Emma Willard School. With the success of her school, she was able to travel across the country and abroad, to promote education for women. Willard pioneered the teaching of science, mathematics, and social studies to young women. She believed in establishing her own guidelines for better education for women, and her book proceeds helped improve female education throughout the world. Willard wrote one of the most widely used textbooks of American history and created the first historical atlas of the U.S. Her maps, graphs, and pictures added the details of the nation's geography into the broad popular image of the country as a large, powerful complex nation.

=== Religion and schools ===
Across the country, Protestant ministers (especially Presbyterians, Congregationalists and Methodists) took the lead in promoting public schools. The Second Great Awakening of religious revivals stimulated the rapid growth of membership, and to foster that religiosity they felt that Sunday Schools were not enough. They decided that universal education in public schools were needed to promote standards of morality. They assumed there would be Bible Reading (from the Protestant King James Bible), but the schools would not be linked to any particular denomination.

As the majority of the nation was Protestant in the 19th century, most states passed a state constitutional amendment, called Blaine Amendments, forbidding tax money be used to fund parochial schools. This was largely directed against Catholics, as the heavy immigration from Catholic Ireland after the 1840s aroused nativist sentiment. There were longstanding tensions between Catholic and Protestant believers, long associated with nation states that had established religions. Many Protestants believed that Catholic children should be educated in public schools in order to become American. By 1890 the Irish, who controlled the Church hierarchy in the U.S., had built an extensive network of parishes and parish schools ("parochial schools") across the urban Northeast and Midwest. The Irish and other Catholic ethnic groups intended parochial schools not only to protect their religion, but to enhance their culture and language.

German Lutherans, and Norwegian Lutherans as well as Dutch Protestants, organized and funded their own elementary parochial schools. Episcopalians built elite boarding schools.

Catholic communities also raised money to build colleges and seminaries to train teachers and religious leaders to head their churches. In the 19th century, most Catholics were Irish or German immigrants and their children; in the 1890s new waves of Catholic immigrants began arriving from Italy and Poland. The parochial schools met some opposition, as in the Bennett Law in Wisconsin in 1890, but they thrived and grew. Catholic nuns served as teachers in most schools and were paid low salaries in keeping with their vows of poverty. In 1925 the U.S. Supreme Court ruled in Pierce v. Society of Sisters that students could attend private schools to comply with state compulsory education laws, thus giving parochial schools an official blessing.

=== Attendance ===
The 1840 census indicated that about 55% of the 3.68 million school age children between the ages of five and fifteen attended primary schools or academies. Many families could not afford to pay for their children to go to school or to spare them from farm work. Beginning in the late 1830s, more private academies were established for girls for education past primary school, especially in northern states. Some offered classical education similar to that offered to boys.

But by 1870, 49 percent of all public schools students were girls, and among girls aged 10–14, literacy rates were often higher than among their male counterparts. Even if many private academies and colleges at the time were single-sex based, most children attended co-educational schools. As the 19th century progressed, maintaining separate schools and classes for girls and boys was expensive and impractical, as very few cities could afford it.

Data from the indentured servant contracts of German immigrant children in Pennsylvania from 1771 to 1817 show that the number of children receiving education increased from 33.3% in 1771–1773 to 69% in 1787–1804. Additionally, the same data showed that the ratio of school education versus home education rose from .25 in 1771–1773 to 1.68 in 1787–1804. While some African Americans managed to achieve literacy, southern states largely prohibited schooling to blacks.

==== Teachers, early 1800s ====
Teaching young students was not an attractive career for educated people. Adults became teachers without any particular skill. Hiring was handled by the local school board, who were mainly interested in the efficient use of limited taxes and favored young single women from local taxpaying families. This started to change with the introduction of two-year normal schools starting in 1823. Normal schools increasingly provided career paths for unmarried middle-class women. By 1900 most teachers of elementary schools in the northern states had been trained at normal schools.

==== One-room schoolhouses ====
Given the high proportion of population in rural areas, with limited numbers of students, most communities relied on one-room school houses. Teachers would deal with the range of students of various ages and abilities by using the Monitorial System, an education method that became popular on a global scale during the early 19th century. This method was also known as "mutual instruction" or the "Bell-Lancaster method" after the British educators Dr Andrew Bell and Joseph Lancaster, who each independently developed it about 1798. As older children in families would teach younger ones, the abler pupils in these schools became 'helpers' to the teacher, and taught other students what they had learned.

==== Horace Mann promotes Prussian model ====
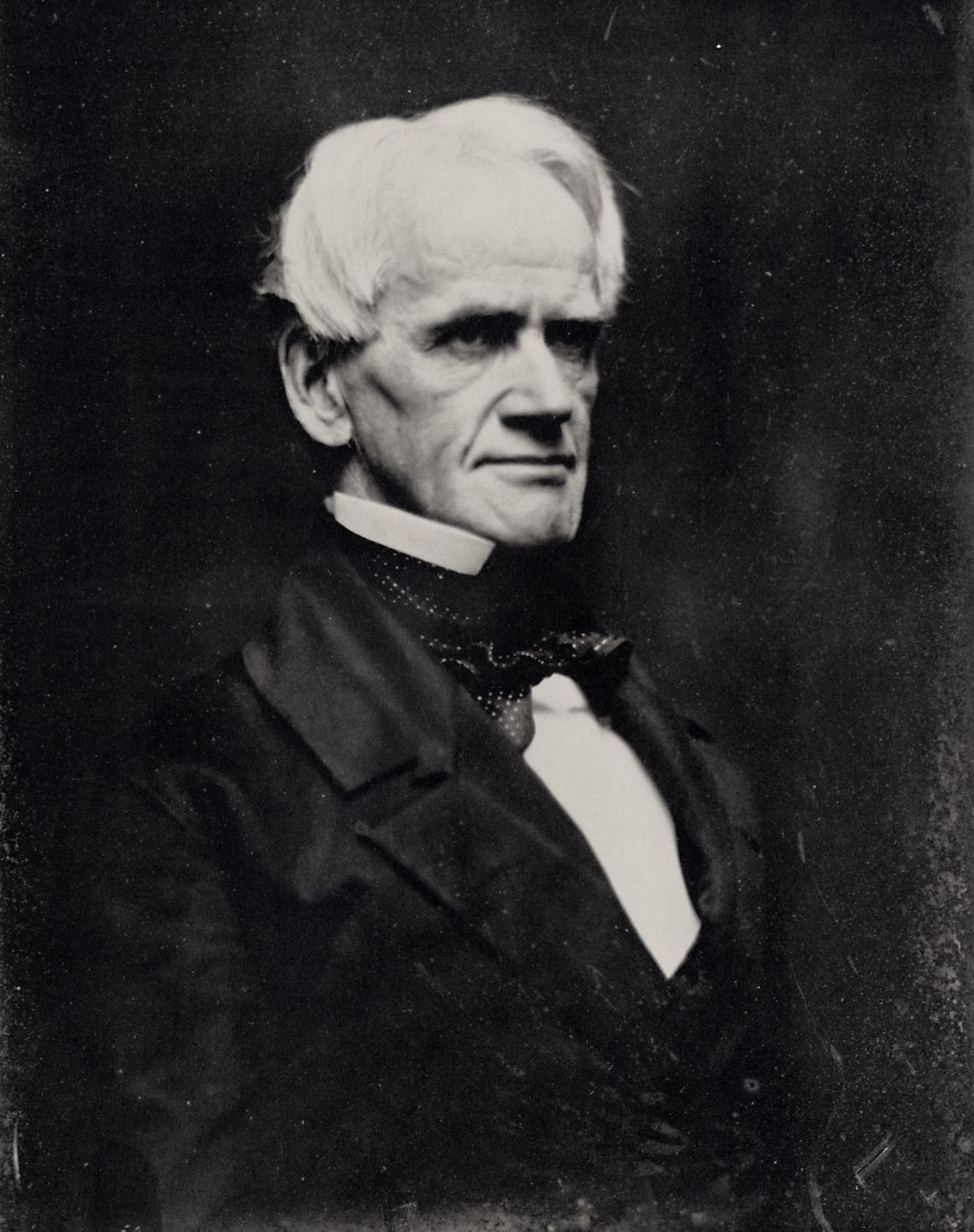
Reformer Horace Mann sought to emulate the Prussian model of education

Upon becoming the secretary of education of Massachusetts in 1837, Horace Mann worked to create a statewide system of professional teachers, based on the Prussian model of "common schools." Prussia was attempting to develop a system of education by which all students were entitled to the same content in their public classes. Mann initially focused on elementary education and on training teachers. The common-school movement quickly gained strength across the North. Connecticut adopted a similar system in 1849, and Massachusetts passed a compulsory attendance law in 1852. Mann's crusading style attracted wide middle-class support. Historian Ellwood P. Cubberley asserts:

No one did more than he to establish in the minds of the American people the conception that education should be universal, non-sectarian, free, and that its aims should be social efficiency, civic virtue, and character, rather than mere learning or the advancement of sectarian ends.

An important technique which Mann had learned in Prussia and introduced in Massachusetts in 1848 was to place students in grades by age. They were assigned by age to different grades and progressed through them, regardless of differences of aptitude. In addition, he used the lecture method common in European universities, which required students to receive professional instruction rather than teach one another. Previously, schools had often had groups of students who ranged in age from 6 to 14 years. With the introduction of age grading, multi-aged classrooms all but disappeared. Some students completed all courses the secondary school had to offer. These were "graduated," and were awarded a certificate of completion. This was increasingly done at a ceremony imitating college graduation rituals.

Arguing that universal public education was the best way to turn the nation's unruly children into disciplined, judicious republican citizens, Mann won widespread approval for building public schools from modernizers, especially among fellow Whigs. Most states adopted one version or another of the system he established in Massachusetts, especially the program for "normal schools" to train professional teachers.

Free schooling was available through some of the elementary grades. Graduates of these schools could read and write, though not always with great precision.

==== Compulsory laws ====
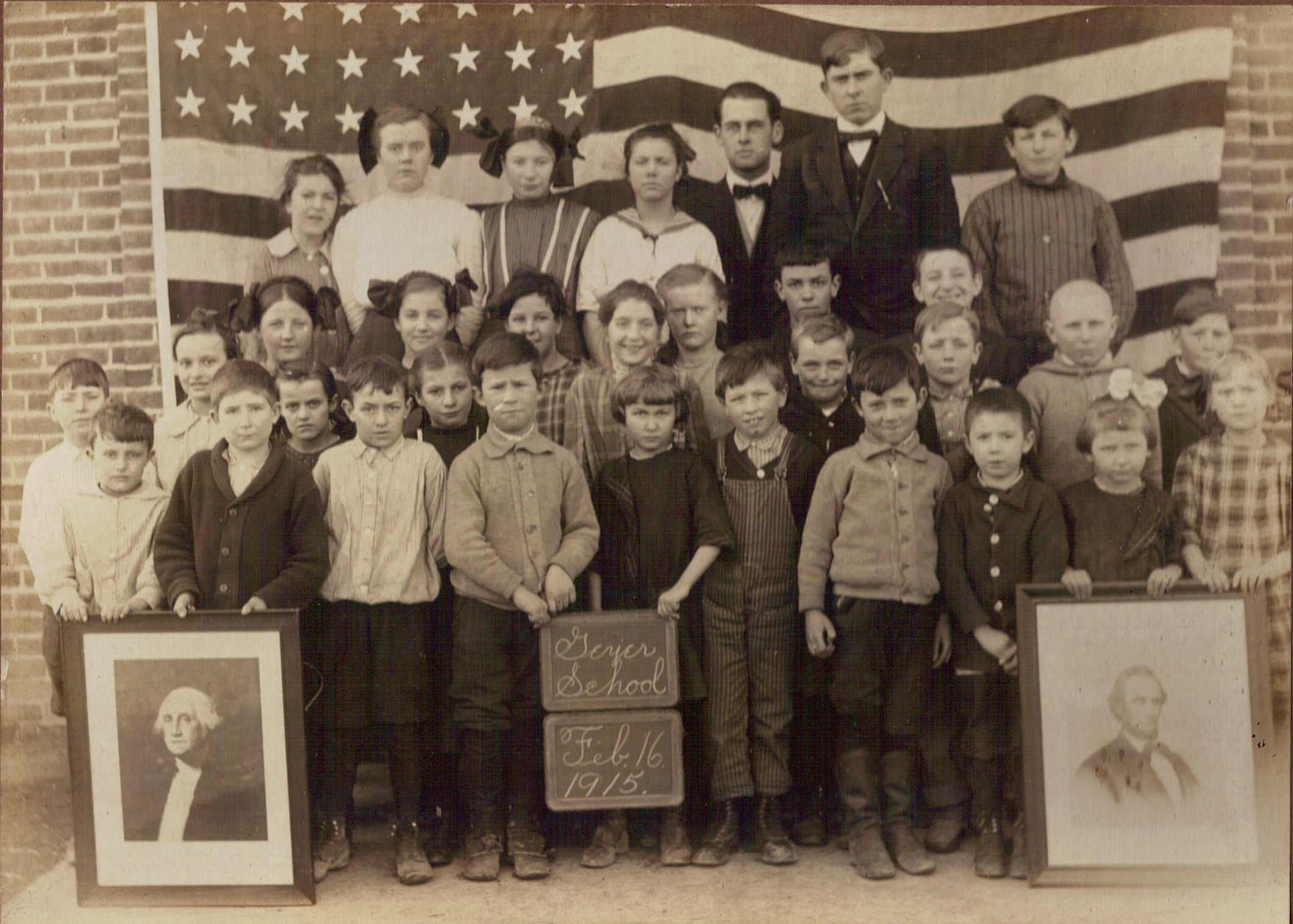
A 1915 class at the Geyer School of Geyer, Ohio

By 1900, 34 states had compulsory schooling laws; four were in the South. Thirty states with compulsory schooling laws required attendance until age 14 (or higher). As a result, by 1910, 72 percent of American children attended school. Half the nation's children attended one-room schools. By 1930, every state required students to complete elementary school.

==== Native American Missionary Schools ====
As religious revivalism swept through the United States in the early 1800s, a growing group of evangelical Christians took on the role of missionaries. These missionaries were, in many cases, concerned with converting non-Christians to Christianity. Native Americans were a nearby and easy target for these missionaries. According to the scholars Theda Perdue and Michael D. Green, these Christian missionaries believed that the Native Americans were uncivilized, and were in need of help from the missionaries to make them more civilized and more like Anglo-Americans.

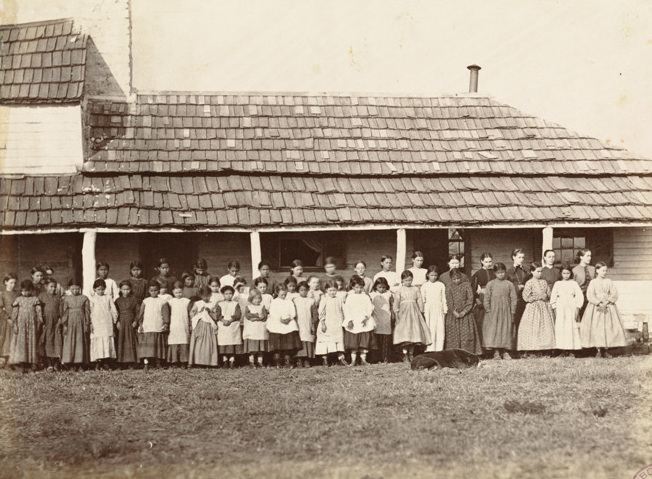
St. Mary's Mission in Kansas was founded in 1847 to convert and assimilate Potawatomi children

Missionaries found great difficulty converting adults, but, according to Perdue and Green's research, they found it much easier to convert Native American children. To do so, missionaries often separated Native American children from their families to live at boarding schools where the missionaries believed they could civilize and convert them. Missionary schools in the American Southeast were first developed in 1817. Perdue and Green's research has shown that these children did not only learn the basic subjects of education that most American children experienced, but also were taught to live and act like Anglo-Americans. Boys learned to farm, and girls were taught domestic labor, and according to Perdue and Green, they were taught that Anglo-American civilization was superior to the traditional Native American cultures that these children came from. David Brown, a Cherokee man who converted to Christianity and promoted the conversion to Christianity of Native Americans, went on a fundraising speaking tour to raise money for missionary societies and their boarding schools. Brown, in his speech, described the progress that he believed had been made in civilizing Native American children in missionary schools. "The Indians," he claimed, "are making rapid advances toward the standard of morality, virtue and religions."

=== Colleges in 19th century ===
Many new colleges were begun, thanks to the lively competitions among rival religious denominations following the widespread religious upsurge of the Second Great Awakening. However, they were typically small operations with a president and two or three faculty and a few dozen students. The curriculum was overwhelmingly focused on Latin and Greek classics and mathematics. Yale's famous report on 1828 was the lynchpin of conservatism relied on by most colleges. It argued that the role of a college education was to discipline the mind by developing the ability to articulate classical ideas, and there was no need to expand the curriculum to cover ideas from recent times. For example, very few colleges taught any history before the 1860s. According to Richard Hofstadter, the old time college was a dreary place:

The students were subjected to a curriculum which rarely gave them any choice of courses, hardly ever a choice of teachers. They were submitted to a teaching routine consisting almost entirely of tedious daily recitations, and governed in detail by disciplinary rules that were excessively demanding. Since their instructors were set over them as policemen, outbursts of mutual hostility were a perennial motif. Term time was frequently punctuated by student riots, and putting the cow in the chapel was a standard college plank.

Summarizing the research of Colin Burke and Peter Hall, Michael Katz concludes that in the 19th century:

1. The nation's many small colleges helped young men make the transition from rural farms to complex urban occupations.
2. These colleges especially promoted upward mobility by preparing ministers, and thereby provided towns across the country with a core of community leaders.
3. The more elite colleges became increasingly exclusive and contributed relatively little to upward social mobility. By concentrating on the offspring of wealthy families, ministers and a few others, the elite Eastern colleges, especially Harvard, played an important role in the formation of a Northeastern elite with great power.

==== Women in college ====
Before 1860, coeducation was rare. A few private schools followed Oberlin's 1833 example of enrolling women along with men, but notably the inexpensive state schools restricted admission to men. The second half of the 19th century, on the other hand, produced relatively rapid gains as colleges for women were founded in New York and Massachusetts. Vassar in 1865 was followed by Wellesley in 1875, Smith in the same year, Bryn Mawr in 1885, Radcliffe in 1879, and Barnard in 1889. The Mount Holyoke Female Seminary was founded by Mary Lyon in 1837, and reached full collegiate status in 1888. Such institutions were fed by a steady stream of female high school graduates, who throughout this period comprised a majority of graduates. High school enrollment trebled in the 1890s, with girls continuing to represent the lion's share. The expansion of both secondary and tertiary public education that began in 1867 and lasted until the early 20th century created greater opportunities for women. Between 1867 and 1915, 304 new colleges and universities were established, bringing the national total to 563. In the liberal arts departments of some state universities including Colorado, Iowa, Kansas, Minnesota, Nebraska, Texas, and Washington, women students outnumbered men.

=== South ===
In the decades immediately following the American Revolution, Georgia, North Carolina, Virginia, and South Carolina started small public universities. However, many wealthy families continued to send their sons North to college. In Georgia, public county academies for white students became more common. After 1811, South Carolina opened a statewide system of "free schools", where white children could learn literacy and basic math at public expense. Other Southern states imitated this system. Before the Civil War it became a primary mode of organizing what became known as basic "poor schools." In the 1850 census, South Carolina had a literacy rate that rivaled Rhode Island.

Republican governments during the Reconstruction era rebuilt the South's public school systems—establishing the first such schools in some places—and supported them with general taxes. For the first time, both whites and blacks would be educated at the expense of the state, but legislators agreed on racially segregated schools. (The few integrated schools were located in New Orleans).

Particularly after white Democrats regained control of the state legislatures in former Confederate states, they consistently underfunded public schools for blacks which continued until the 1940s. In the famous 1954 Brown v. Board of Education decision the United States Supreme Court declared state laws establishing separate public schools for black and white students to be unconstitutional. That began a complex process of desegregation.

Generally public schooling in rural areas did not extend beyond the elementary grades for either whites or blacks. This was known as "eighth grade school" After 1900, some cities began to establish high schools, primarily for middle class whites. In the 1930s roughly one fourth of the US population still lived and worked on farms and few rural Southerners of either race went beyond the 8th grade until after 1945.

==== Schools for Black students ====
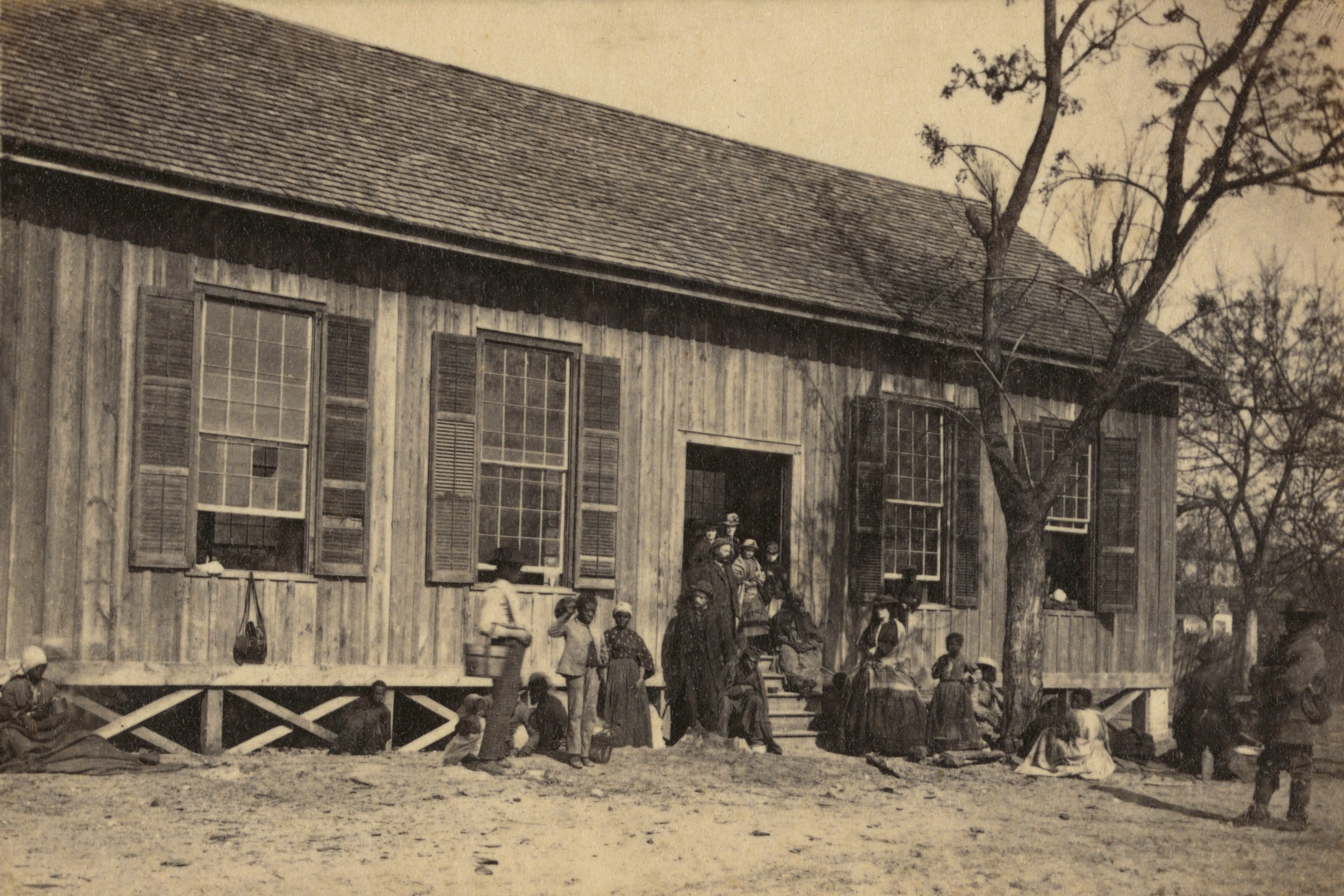
The Freedmen's School of Edisto Island, South Carolina photographed c. 1865

In the early days of the Reconstruction era, the Freedmen's Bureau opened 1000 schools across the South for black children. This was essentially building on schools that had been established in numerous large contraband camps. Freedmen were eager for schooling for both adults and children, and the enrollments were high and enthusiastic. Overall, the Bureau spent $5 million to set up schools for blacks. By the end of 1865, more than 90,000 freedmen were enrolled as students in these schools. The school curriculum resembled that of schools in the North.

Many Bureau teachers were well-educated Yankee women motivated by religion and abolitionism. W.E.B. DuBois wrote of the zealous spirit and success of what he referred to as "the crusade of the New England schoolma'am." Half the teachers were southern whites; one-third were blacks, and one-sixth were northern whites. Most were women but among African Americans, male teachers slightly outnumbered female teachers. In the South, people were attracted to teaching because of the good salaries, at a time when the societies were disrupted and the economy was poor. Northern teachers were typically funded by northern organizations and were motivated by humanitarian goals to help the freedmen. As a group, only the black cohort showed a commitment to racial equality; they were also the ones most likely to continue as teachers.

When the Republicans came to power in the Southern states after 1867, they created the first system of taxpayer-funded public schools. Southern Blacks wanted public schools for their children but they did not demand racially integrated schools. Almost all the new public schools were segregated, apart from a few in New Orleans. After the Republicans lost power in the mid-1870s, conservative whites retained the public school systems but sharply cut their funding.

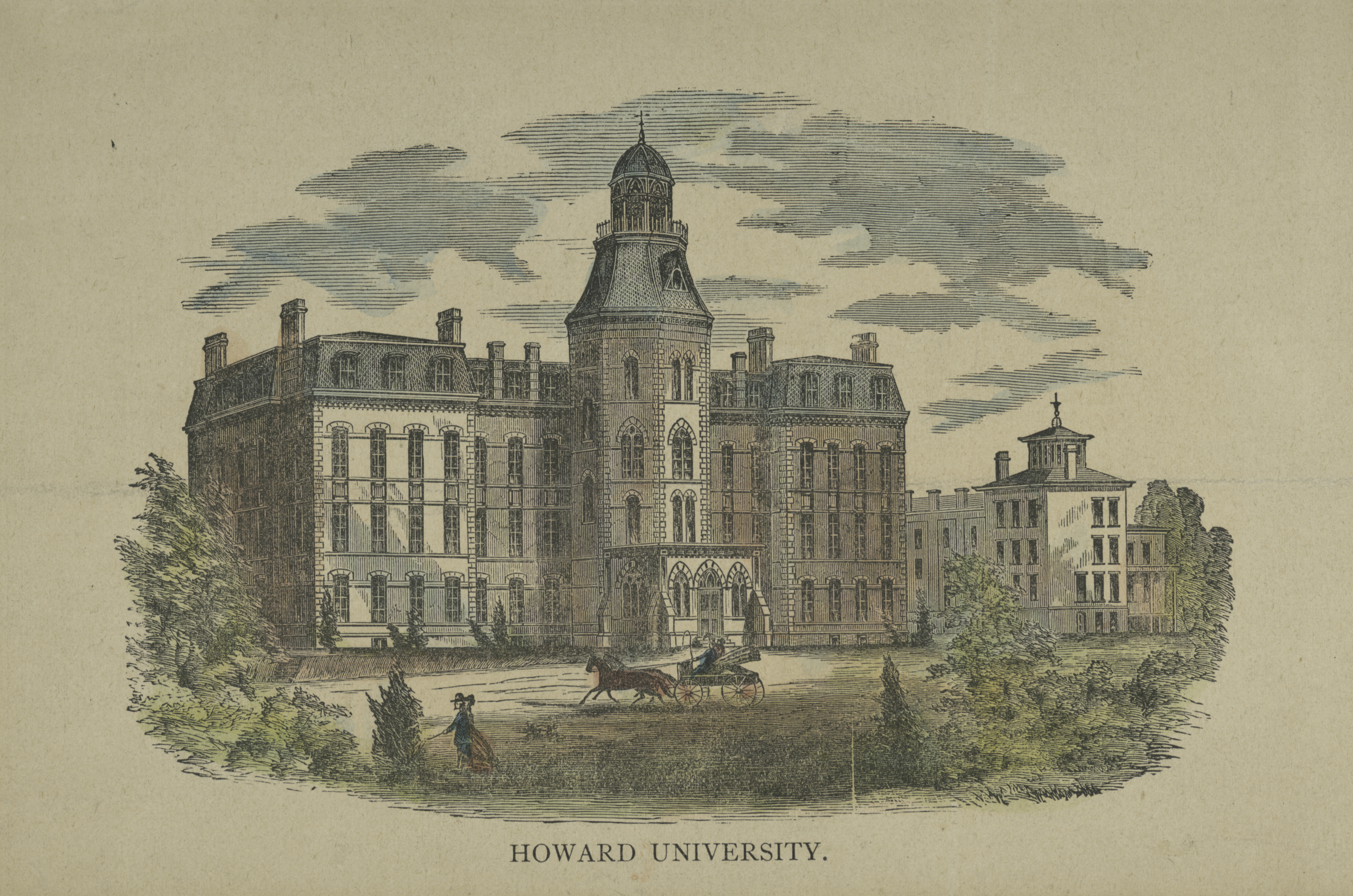
Howard University was founded in 1867, making it one of a number of historically black colleges and universities established after the American Civil War

Almost all private academies and colleges in the South were strictly segregated by race. The American Missionary Association supported the development and establishment of several historically black colleges, such as Fisk University and Shaw University. In this period, a handful of northern colleges accepted black students. The Oneida Institute of Science and Industry (founded 1827) was the first institution of higher education to routinely admit African-American men and provide mixed-race college-level education. Oberlin College (founded 1833) was the first mainly white, degree-granting college to admit African-American students. However, before the Civil War it is likely that only 3–5% of Oberlin students were African-American. By 1900, 400 African-Americans had earned B.A. degrees from Harvard, Yale, Oberlin, and 70 other "leading colleges." Northern denominations and their missionary associations especially established private schools across the South to provide secondary education. They provided a small amount of collegiate work. Tuition was minimal, so churches supported the colleges financially, and also subsidized the pay of some teachers. In 1900, churches—mostly based in the North—operated 247 schools for blacks across the South, with a budget of about $1 million. They employed 1600 teachers and taught 46,000 students. Prominent schools included Howard University, a federal institution based in Washington; Fisk University in Nashville, Atlanta University, Hampton Institute in Virginia, and many others. Most new colleges in the 19th century were founded in northern states.

In 1890, Congress expanded the land-grant program to include federal support for state-sponsored colleges across the South. It required states to identify colleges for black students as well as white ones in order to get land grant support. This second Morrill Land-Grant Act thus simultaneously provided increased higher educational opportunities for African Americans but encouraged segregation.

Hampton Normal and Agricultural Institute was of national importance because it set the standards for what was called industrial education. Booker T. Washington, one of its graduates, founded the influential Tuskegee Normal School for Colored Teachers in 1881. Washington championed industrial education for African Americans on the basis of its practicality, whereas W.E.B. DuBois emphasized the importance of offering African Americans the opportunity to prove themselves equal to whites by succeeding in traditional, classically-oriented B.A. degree programs. In 1900 relatively few black students were enrolled in college-level work because their schools were understaffed and underfunded and the students needed remedial study. The alumni of Keithley became high school teachers. However, some HBCUs—such as Howard University, Fisk University, and Atlanta University—had standard B.A. programs with classical curricula.

While the colleges and academies were generally coeducational, until the late 20th century, historians had taken little notice of the role of women as students and teachers.

== 20th century ==
=== Progressive Era ===
The American economy was growing steadily every decade from the 1880s to 1930, despite occasional recessions and depressions. The population was growing as well, and with immigrants from Europe as well as farmers' sons moving to urban areas. At the same time state child labor laws removed most younger children from factory jobs. Productivity was moving up as well. The challenge was for the educational system to support this growth.

The progressive era in education was part of a larger Progressive Movement, extending from the 1890s to the 1930s. The era was notable for a dramatic expansion in the number of schools and students served, especially in the fast-growing metropolitan cities. After 1910, smaller cities also began building high schools. By 1940, 50% of young adults had earned a high school diploma.

==== Committee of Ten ====
The National Education Association convened the Committee of Ten in 1892. The resulting report was influential in structuring grades 1 through 12 across school districts and states, as well as what subjects would be taught.

==== Bureaucracies ====
By the 1890s state legislatures organized local school districts under the general supervision of a statewide superintendent of public instruction, assisted by an appointed state board of education. The system remains in effect in the 21st century. The state superintendents were business managers more than educators. They identified with the business community, and made frequent analogy to making schools a business-like bureaucracy, with maximum efficiency and minimum waste, at reasonable expense to the taxpayer, with a long term benefit of enhanced economic growth. They believe that students should be tightly controlled and teachers closely supervised. The superintendents emphasized the need for uniformity, strict adherence to elaborate rules, and avoiding local variations.

As early as 1880 Charles Francis Adams Jr. called school superintendents, "drill sergeants " and likened their overcontrolled schools to "a combination cotton mill and railroad." Radical historians in the 1960s, steeped in the anti-bureaucratic ethos of the New Left, deplored the bureaucratic school systems. They argued its purpose was to suppress the upward aspirations of the working class. But other historians have emphasized the necessity of building non-politicized standardized systems. The reforms in St. Louis, according to historian Selwyn Troen, were, "born of necessity as educators first confronted the problems of managing a rapidly expanding and increasingly complex institutions." Troen found that the bureaucratic solution removed schools from the bitterness and spite of ward politics. Troen argues:

In the space of only a generation, public education had left behind a highly regimented and politicized system dedicated to training children in the basic skills of literacy and the special discipline required of urban citizens, and had replaced it with a largely apolitical, more highly organized and efficient structure specifically designed to teach students the many specialized skills demanded in a modern, industrial society. In terms of programs this entailed the introduction of vocational instruction, a doubling of the period of schooling, and a broader concern for the welfare of urban youth.

The social elite in many cities in the 1890s-1920s led the progressive movement. Their goal was to permanently end political party control of the local schools for the benefit of patronage jobs and construction contracts, which had arisen out of ward politics that absorbed and leveraged the millions of new immigrants. Reformers installed a bureaucratic system run by experts, and demanded expertise from prospective teachers. The reforms opened the way for hiring more Irish Catholic and Jewish teachers, who proved adept at handling the civil service tests and gaining the necessary academic credentials. Before the reforms, schools had often been used as a means to provide patronage jobs for party foot soldiers. The new emphasis concentrated on broadening opportunities for the students. New programs were established for the physically handicapped; evening recreation centers were set up; vocational schools were opened; medical inspections became routine; programs began to teach English as a second language; and school libraries were opened. New teaching strategies were developed, such as the shifting the focus of secondary education towards speaking and writing, as outlined by the Hosic Report in 1917.

Responding to discussions about the advantages of copying business style managerial controls in the field of public schooling, some key leaders were explicitly opposed. Ellwood P. Cubberley , Dean of the Stanford School of Education, in 1926 warned in a standard textbook for school superintendents that:

A superintendent whose conception of educational administration is that of clockwork, machinery, inspections, and uniform output, and who runs the educational department much as he would run a factory...will not only fail to develop strength and individuality on the part of those who do the real work of the schools, but will crush out what of these qualities the workers may possess.

==== Dewey and progressive education ====
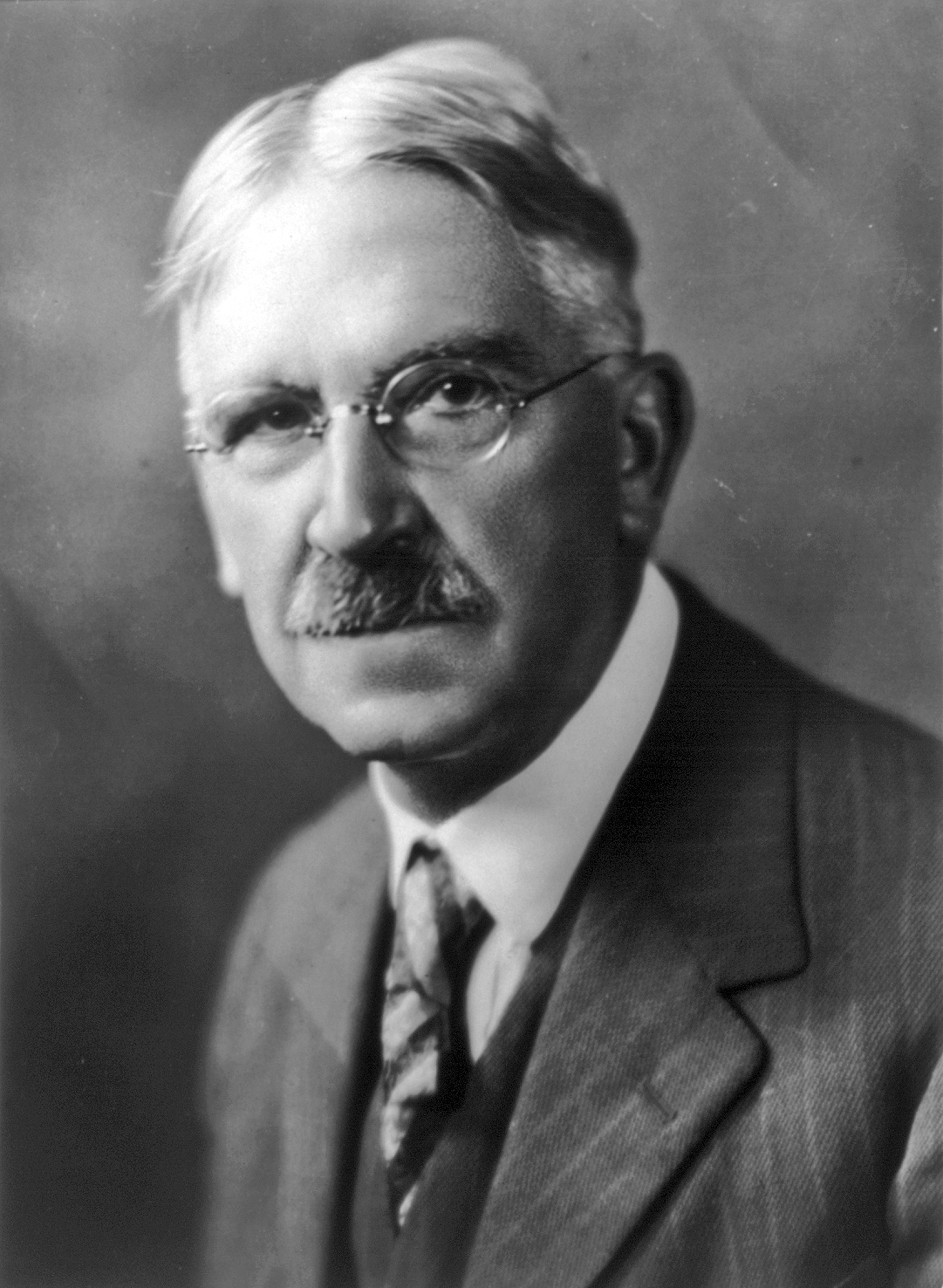
John Dewey was the major voice of progressive education

The leading educational theorist of the era was John Dewey, a philosophy professor at the University of Chicago (1894–1904) and at Teachers College (1904 to 1930), of Columbia University in New York City. Dewey was a leading proponent of "Progressive Education" and wrote many books and articles to promote the central role of democracy in education. He believed that schools were not only a place for students to gain content knowledge, but also as a place for them to learn how to live. The purpose of education was thus to realize the student's full potential and the ability to use those skills for the greater good.

Dewey noted that, "to prepare him for the future life means to give him command of himself; it means so to train him that he will have the full and ready use of all his capacities." Dewey insisted that education and schooling are instrumental in creating social change and reform. He noted that "education is a regulation of the process of coming to share in the social consciousness; and that the adjustment of individual activity on the basis of this social consciousness is the only sure method of social reconstruction.". Although Dewey's ideas were very widely discussed, they were implemented chiefly in small experimental schools attached to colleges of education. In the public schools, Dewey and the other progressive theorists encountered a highly bureaucratic system of school administration that was typically not receptive to new methods.

Dewey viewed public schools and their narrow-mindedness with disdain and as undemocratic and close minded. Meanwhile, laboratory schools, such as the University of Chicago Laboratory Schools, were much more open to original thought and experimentation. Not only was Dewey involved with laboratory schools, but he was also deeply involved with the emerging philosophy of pragmatism, which he incorporated within his laboratory schools. Dewey viewed pragmatism critical for the growth of democracy, which Dewey did not view as just a form of government, but something that occurred within the workings of the laboratory schools as well as everyday life. Dewey utilized the laboratory schools as an experimental platform for his theories on pragmatism, democracy, as well as how humans learned.

==== Black education ====
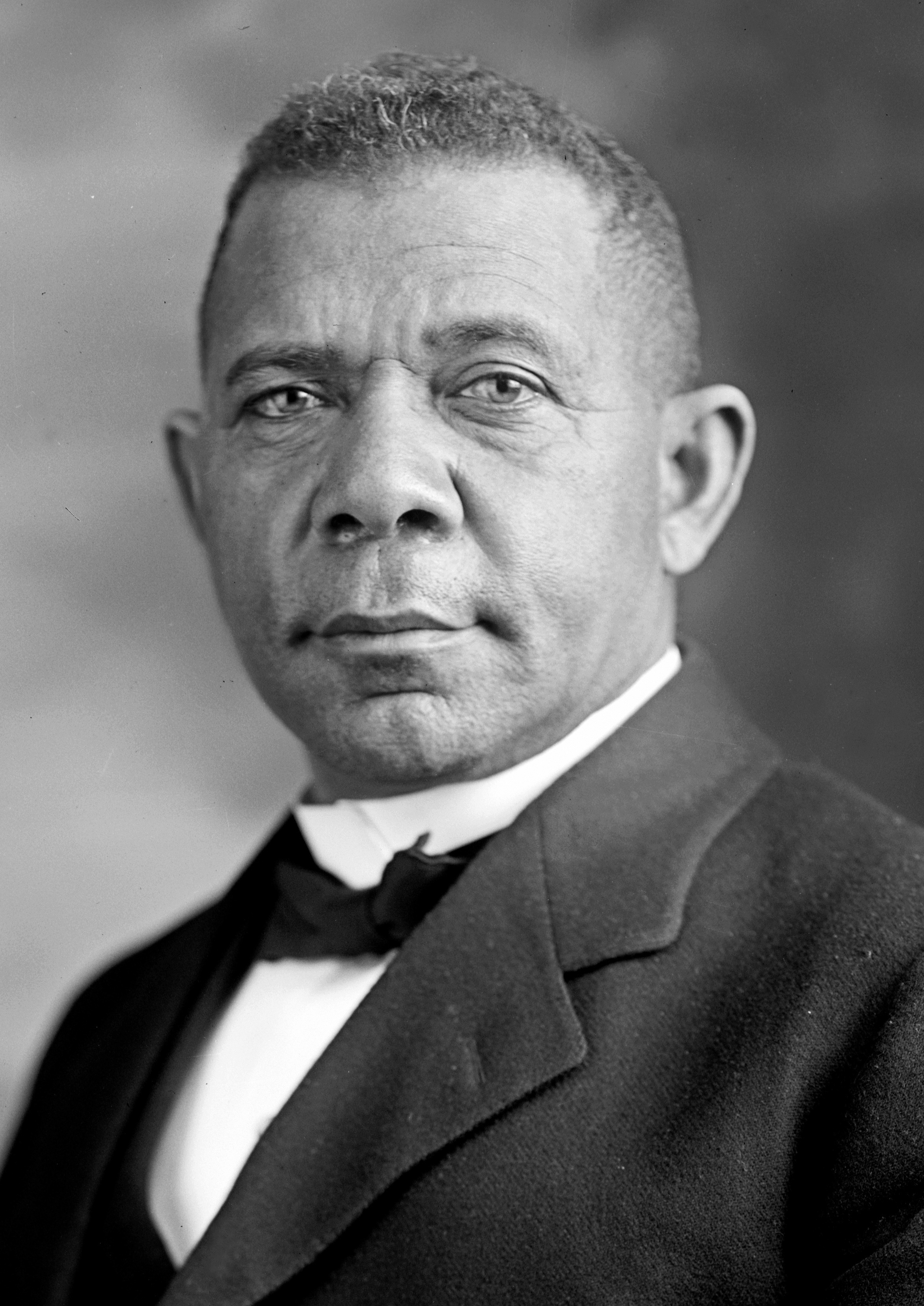
Booker T. Washington, the leading figure in late 19th and early 20th century Black America

Booker T. Washington was the dominant black political and educational leader in the United States from the 1890s until his death in 1915. Washington not only led his own college, Tuskegee Institute in Alabama, but his advice, political support, and financial connections proved important to many other black colleges and high schools, which were primarily located in the South. This was the center of the black population until after the Great Migration of the first half of the 20th century. Washington was a respected advisor to major philanthropies, such as the Rockefeller, Rosenwald and Jeanes foundations, which provided funding for leading black schools and colleges. The Rosenwald Foundation provided matching funds for the construction of schools for rural black students in the South. Washington explained, "We need not only the industrial school, but the college and professional school as well, for a people so largely segregated, as we are. ... Our teachers, ministers, lawyers and doctors will prosper just in proportion as they have about them an intelligent and skillful producing class." Washington was a strong advocate of progressive reforms as advocated by Dewey, emphasizing scientific, industrial and agricultural education that produced a base for lifelong learning, and enabled careers for many black teachers, professionals, and upwardly mobile workers. He tried to adapt to the system and did not support political protests against the segregated Jim Crow system. At the same time, Washington used his network to provide important funding to support numerous legal challenges by the NAACP against the systems of disenfranchisement which southern legislatures had passed at the turn of the century, effectively excluding blacks from politics for decades into the 1960s.

==== Atlanta ====
In most American cities, Progressives in the Efficiency Movement looked for ways to eliminate waste and corruption. They emphasized using experts in schools. For example, in the 1897 reform of the Atlanta schools, the school board was reduced in size, eliminating the power of ward bosses. The members of the school board were elected at-large, reducing the influence of various interest groups. The power of the superintendent was increased. Centralized purchasing allowed for economies of scale, although it also added opportunities for censorship and suppression of dissent. Standards of hiring and tenure in teachers were made uniform. Architects designed school buildings in which the classrooms, offices, workshops and other facilities related together. Curricular innovations were introduced. The reforms were designed to produce a school system for all students according to the best practices of the day. Middle-class professionals instituted these reforms; they were equally antagonistic to the traditional business elites and to working-class elements.

==== Gary plan ====
The "Gary plan" was implemented in the new industrial "steel" city of Gary, Indiana, by William Wirt, the superintendent who served from 1907 to 1930. Although the U.S. Steel Corporation dominated the Gary economy and paid abundant taxes, it did not shape Wirt's educational reforms. The Gary Plan emphasized highly efficient use of buildings and other facilities. This model was adopted by more than 200 cities around the country, including New York City. Wirt divided students into two platoons—one platoon used the academic classrooms, while the second platoon was divided among the shops, nature studies, auditorium, gymnasium, and outdoor facilities. Then the platoons rotated position.

Wirt set up an elaborate night school program, especially to Americanize new immigrants. The introduction of vocational educational programs, such as wood shop, machine shop, typing, and secretarial skills proved especially popular with parents who wanted their children to become foremen and office workers. By the Great Depression, most cities found the Gary plan too expensive, and abandoned it.

==== Vocational education ====
In 1914 the Commission on National Aid to Vocational Education led by Senator Hoke Smith and Charles A. Prosser called for vocational education to be included in the high school curriculum.

It argued that vocational education:

(1) met the individual needs of students for a meaningful curriculum,

(2) provided opportunity for all students to prepare for life and work,

(3) helped foster a better teaching-learning process-learning by doing,

(4) introduced tbe idea of utility into education.

According to John Hillison, supporters of vocational education ridiculed the traditional academic emphasis on courses in Greek, Latin and ancient philosophy. Prosser led the design team so that the Smith-Hughes Act would give federal money to support specialized state government programs that worked with public high schools to train students for industrial, and agricultural jobs, as well as home economics for wives of workers. They saw education as a means to maximize productivity and meet the demands of a rapidly industrializing economy. They wrote a bill that Congress passed: the Smith-Hughes National Vocational Education Act of 1917. It established a federal partnership with the states for a highly detailed program of vocational education in agriculture, trades, industries, and home economics. It aimed to equip students with practical skills for the changing job market. To secure passage it organized a temporary coalition that pushed it through. Prosser, Smith and the other key leaders were based in the National Society for the Promotion of Industrial Education (NSPIE). They secured statements of support and lobbying help from many organizations. Those included the skilled workers of the unions represented by the American Federation of Labor (AFL); the teachers represented by the National Education Association (NEA); big business as represented by the National Association of Manufacturers (NAM); local business as represented by the U. S. Chamber of Commerce; the national Democratic Party; the Progressive Bull Moose Party and its leader former president Theodore Roosevelt; women teachers represented by American Home Economics Association; middle class women of the General Federation of Women's Clubs; and the agricultural community represented by several major farm journals, the National Grange and the Association of American Agricultural Colleges and Experiment Stations.

The most dramatic support came from President Woodrow Wilson. With World War I raging in Europe, the U.S. was still neutral. Wilson made military preparedness an urgent top priority, telling Congress in January 1916:

There are two sides to the question of preparation. There's not merely the military side; there is the industrial side. . . .We ought to have in this country a great system of industrial and vocational education under Federal guidance, and with Federal aid, in which a very large percentage of the youth of this country will be given training in the skillful use and application of the principles of science in maneuver and business.

=== Great Depression and New Deal: 1929–39 ===
Public schools across the country were badly hurt by the Great Depression, as tax revenues fell in local and state governments shifted funding to relief projects. Budgets were slashed, and teachers went unpaid. During the New Deal, 1933–39, President Franklin Roosevelt and his advisers were hostile to the elitism shown by the educational establishment. They refused all pleas for direct federal help to public or private schools or universities. They rejected proposals for federal funding for research at universities. But they did help poor students, and the major New Deal relief programs built many schools buildings as requested by local governments. The New Deal approach to education was a radical departure from educational best practices. It was specifically designed for the poor and staffed largely by women on relief. It was not based on professionalism, nor was it designed by experts. Instead it was premised on the anti-elitist notion that a good teacher does not need paper credentials, that learning does not need a formal classroom and that the highest priority should go to the bottom tier of society. Leaders in the public schools were shocked: They were shut out as consultants and as recipients of New Deal funding. They desperately needed cash to cover the local and state revenues that had disappeared during the depression, they were well organized, and made repeated concerted efforts in 1934, 1937, and 1939, all to no avail. The conservative Republican establishment headed collaborated with for so long was out of power and Roosevelt himself was the leader in anti-elitism. The federal government had a highly professional Office of Education; Roosevelt cut its budget and staff, and refused to consult with its leader John Ward Studebaker. The Civilian Conservation Corps (CCC) programs were deliberately designed to not teach skills that would put them in competition with unemployed union members. The CCC did have its own classes. They were voluntary, took place after work, and focused on teaching basic literacy to young men who had quit school before high school.

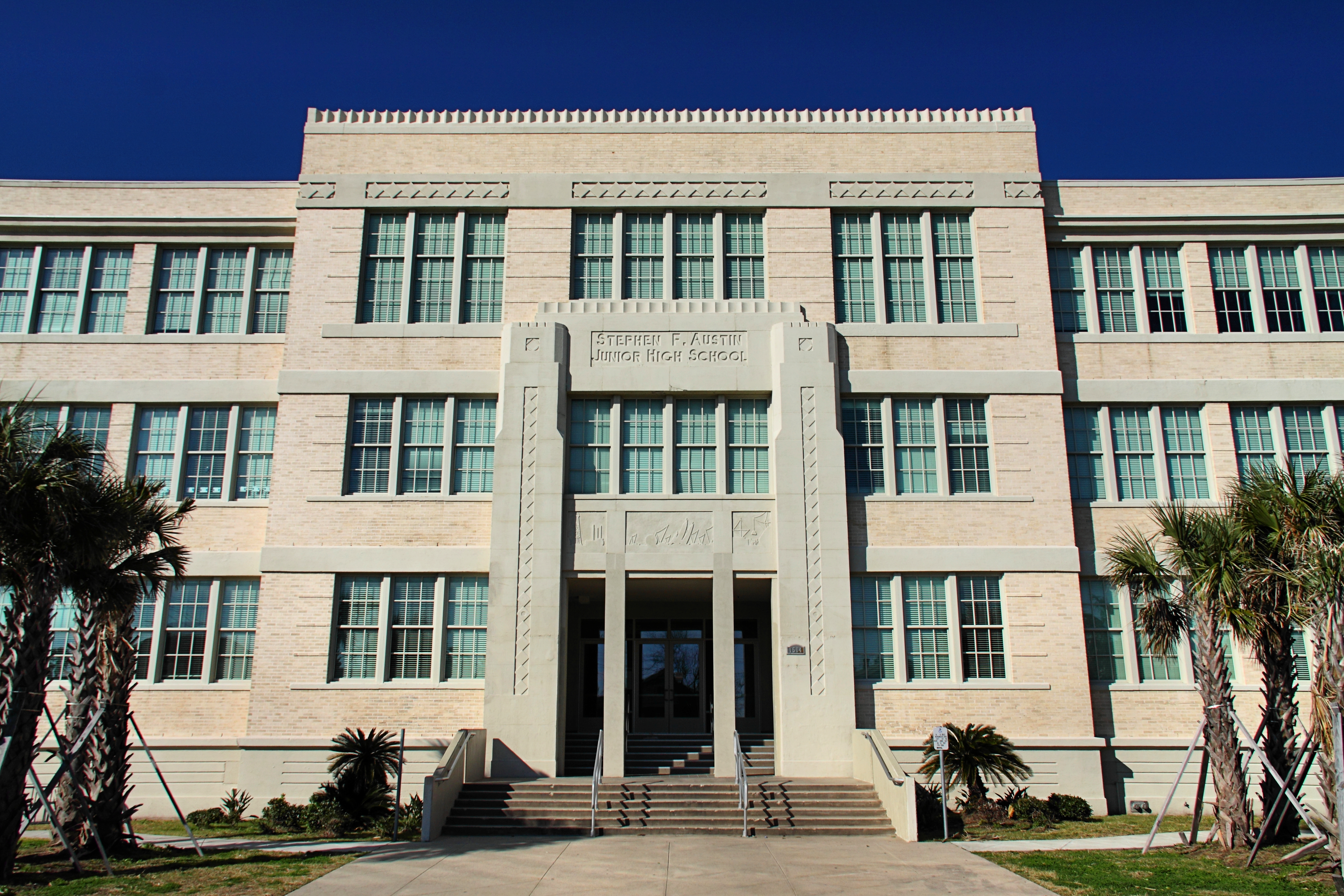
Stephen F Austin Junior High in Galveston, Texas was built by the Works Progress Administration in 1939

The relief programs did offer indirect help. The Civil Works Administration (CWA) and Federal Emergency Relief Administration (FERA) focused on hiring unemployed people on relief, and putting them to work on public buildings, including public schools. It built or upgraded 40,000 schools, plus thousands of playgrounds and athletic fields. It gave jobs to 50,000 teachers to keep rural schools open and to teach adult education classes in the cities. It gave a temporary jobs to unemployed teachers in cities like Boston. Although the New Deal refused to give money to impoverished school districts, it did give money to impoverished high school and college students. The CWA used "work study" programs to fund students, both male and female.

The National Youth Administration (NYA), a semi-autonomous branch of the Works Progress Administration (WPA) under Aubrey Williams developed apprenticeship programs and residential camps specializing in teaching vocational skills. It was one of the first agencies to set up a "Division of Negro Affairs" and make an explicit effort to enroll black students. Williams believed that the traditional high school curricula had failed to meet the needs of the poorest youth. In opposition, the well-established National Education Association (NEA) saw NYA as a dangerous challenge to local control of education NYA expanded Work-study money to reach up to 500,000 students per month in high schools, colleges, and graduate schools. The average pay was $15 a month. However, in line with the anti-elitist policy, the NYA set up its own high schools, entirely separate from the public school system or academic schools of education. Despite appeals from Ickes and Eleanor Roosevelt, Howard University–the federally operated school for blacks—saw its budget cut below Hoover administration levels.

=== Consolidation: the passing of the one room schoolhouse ===
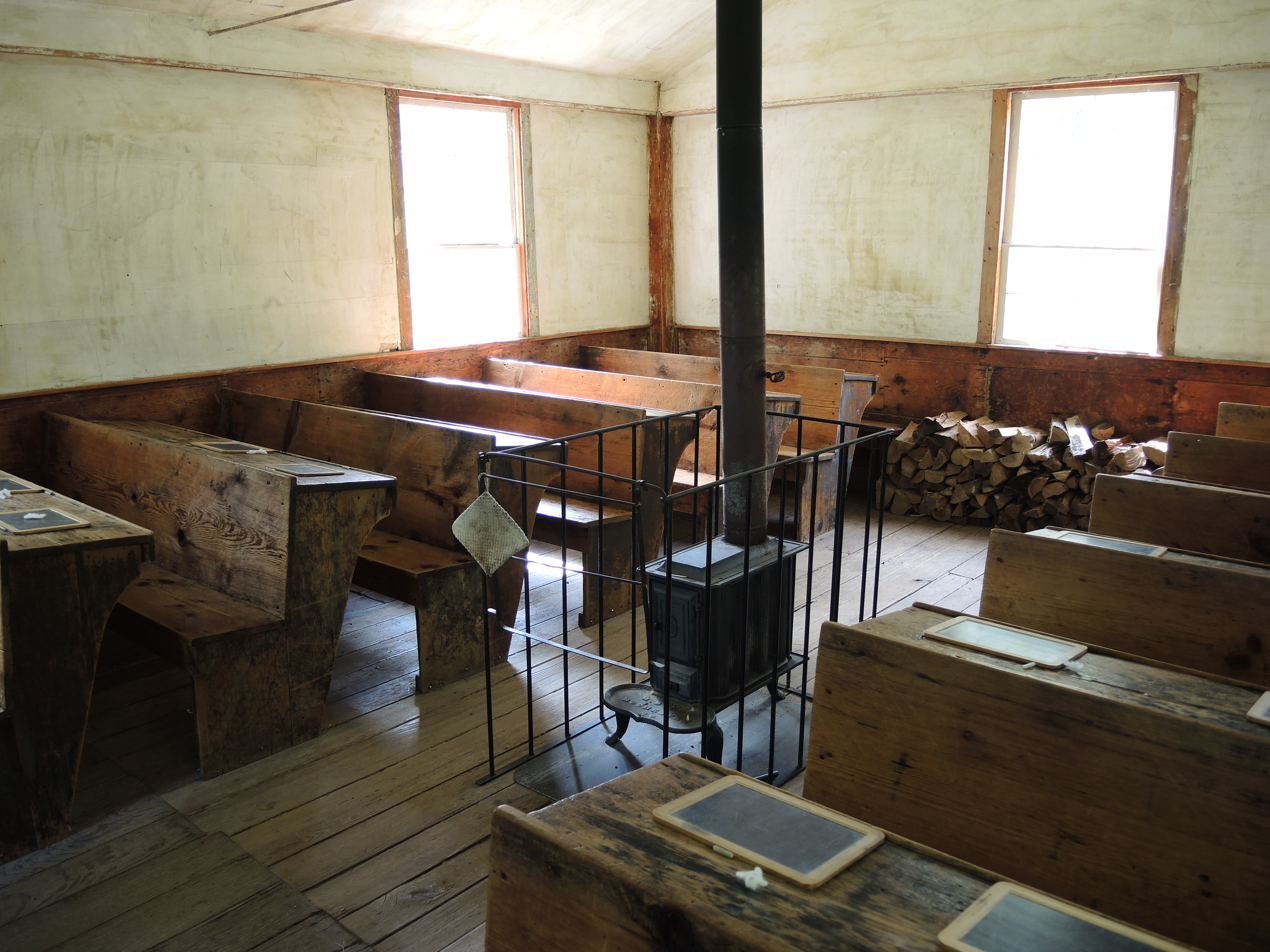
A reconstructed one-room 19th century schoolhouse in rural New York State

In 1930, the nation had 238,000 elementary schools, of which 149,000 were one-room schools wherein one teacher simultaneously handled all students, aged 6 to 16. The teacher was typically the daughter of a local farm family. She averaged four years of training in a nearby high school or normal school. On average, she had two and a half years of teaching experience and planned to continue for another two or three years until she married. She had 22 students enrolled, but on average day only 15 were in attendance. She taught 152 days a year, and was paid $874. The students were not divided into grades 1 to 8, but grouped loosely by age. The teacher spent the day moving from group to group, giving them texts to memorize and then listening to their recitations. They did not have homework or tests. The condition of the school buildings ranged from poor to mediocre; they were lucky to have an outhouse. Andrew Gulliford says, "Rural schools were frequently overcrowded, materials were hard to obtain, and repairs and improvements were subject to the financial whims of parsimonious school boards hesitant even to replace dogeared textbooks."

Sharp debates took place in most of the local districts about merging into a consolidated district. Proponents had a bundle of arguments that especially appealed to ambitious parents and efficiency-oriented businessmen:

(1) a reduction of per-class or per-capita costs; (2) a greater equalization of local tax burdens; (3) a decrease in the number of teachers needed; (4) an increase in the preparation, experience, and tenure of teachers; (5) better educational achievement by pupils; (6) broader curricula; (7) an increase in the instructional time for each pupil or each class; (8) a longer school term; (9) improved attendance; (10) better school plants and equipment; and (11) greater economy and efficiency in the administration and supervision of schools.

The opposition fought back hard, fearful of new taxes, a loss of local autonomy and moral decay:

(1) the necessity for pupil transportation with its attendant expense and difficulties; (2) loss of the one-room school as a community center; (3) construction of new buildings or additions to present buildings; (4) increased tax rates; (5) decreased land values in the district losing its school; (6) greater danger of epidemics of disease among pupils because of the concentrated school population; (7) decrease in attention given individual pupils because of the increase in class size; (8) lessening of cooperation by school patrons; (9) need for better clothing for children to attend a consolidated school; (10) less freedom for the pupil to advance at a rate best suited to his abilities; (11) the possibility of jealousy among the various communities comprising the consolidated district; and, (12) increased danger to children's physical and moral well being because of poorer supervision during the recess periods.

Consolidation began in the Northeast by 1900, spread to every state, and everywhere its coverage escalated after 1945. The process of centralization leveled off by 1970, when the nation had 18,000 districts with 66,000 elementary schools, of which only 2000 were one-room. Local communities did not disintegrate—they also consolidated into a larger entity, as shown by Indiana high school basketball. The consolidated schools—even in small towns like Milan—could field competitive basketball teams which became the focus of community spirit. A Hoosier historian reports:

Almost every town had a high school gym that could seat the entire student body several times over. A few could hold the entire town....Family members screamed through cupped hands and the whole town was exhausted on Saturday morning from the effort of rooting on Friday night.

Today Milan High School with 390 students fields 12 varsity teams, though none has matched the 1954 miracle win of the state basketball champsionship when it had only 161 students.

=== Secondary schools ===
In 1880, American high schools were primarily considered to be preparatory academies for students who were going to attend college. But by 1910 they had been transformed into core elements of the common school system and had broader goals of preparing many students for work after high school. The explosive growth brought the number of students in public high schools from 203,000 in 1890 to 915,000 in 1910, to 2,200,000 in 1920, and 6,600,000 in 1940. Of youths aged 14 to 17, 7% were enrolled in 1890, rising to 32% in 1920 and 83% in 1950. The graduates found jobs especially in the rapidly growing white-collar sector. Cities large and small across the country raced to build new high schools. Few were built in rural areas, so ambitious parents moved close to town to enable their teenagers to attend high school. After 1910, vocational education was added, as a mechanism to train the technicians and skilled workers needed by the booming industrial sector.

In the 1880s the high schools started developing as community centers. They added sports and by the 1920s were building gymnasiums and stadiums that attracted large local crowds to basketball and football games, especially in small town schools that served nearby rural areas.

==== College preparation ====
In the 1865–1914 era, the number and character of schools changed to meet the demands of new and larger cities and of new immigrants. They had to adjust to the new spirit of reform permeating the country. High schools increased in number, adjusted their curriculum to prepare students for the growing state and private universities; education at all levels began to offer more utilitarian studies in place of an emphasis on the classics. John Dewey and other Progressives advocated changes from their base in teachers' colleges.

Before 1920 most secondary education, whether private or public, emphasized college entry for a select few headed for college. Proficiency in Greek and Latin was emphasized; in 1910, almost half of all high school students were taking Latin. Abraham Flexner, under commission from the philanthropic General Education Board (GEB), wrote A Modern School (1916), calling for a de-emphasis on the classics. The classics teachers fought back in a losing effort.

Prior to World War I, German was preferred as a subject for a second spoken language. Prussian and German educational systems had served as a model for many communities in the United States and its intellectual standing was highly respected. Due to Germany being an enemy of the US during the war, an anti-German attitude arose in the United States. French, the international language of diplomacy, was promoted as the preferred second language instead. French survived as the second language of choice until the 1960s, when Spanish became popular. This reflected a strong increase in the Spanish-speaking population in the United States, which has continued since the late 20th century.

==== Growth of human capital ====
By 1900 educators argued that the post-literacy schooling of the masses at the secondary and higher levels, would improve citizenship, develop higher-order traits, and produce the managerial and professional leadership needed for rapid economic modernization. The rapid expansion of education past age 14 set the U.S. apart from Europe for much of the 20th century.

From 1910 to 1940, high schools grew in number and size, reaching out to a broader clientele. In 1910, for example, 9% of Americans had a high school diploma; in 1935, the rate was 40%. By 1940, the number had increased to 50%. This phenomenon was uniquely American; no other nation attempted such widespread coverage. The fastest growth came in states with greater wealth, more homogeneity of wealth, and less manufacturing activity than others. The high schools provided necessary skill sets for youth planning to teach school, and essential skills for those planning careers in white collar work and some high-paying blue collar jobs. Claudia Goldin argues this rapid growth was facilitated by public funding, openness, gender neutrality, local (and also state) control, separation of church and state, and an academic curriculum. The wealthiest European nations, such as Germany and Britain, had far more exclusivity in their education system; few youth attended past age 14. Apart from technical training schools, European secondary schooling was dominated by children of the wealthy and the social elites.

American post-elementary schooling was designed to be consistent with national needs. It stressed general and widely applicable skills not tied to particular occupations or geographic areas, in order that students would have flexible employment options. As the economy was dynamic, the emphasis was on portable skills that could be used in a variety of occupations, industries, and regions.

Public schools were funded and supervised by independent districts that depended on taxpayer support. In dramatic contrast to the centralized systems in Europe, where national agencies made the major decisions, the American districts designed their own rules and curricula.

==== Teachers and administrators ====
Early public school superintendents emphasized discipline and rote learning, and school principals made sure the mandate was imposed on teachers. Disruptive students were expelled.

Support for the high school movement occurred at the grass-roots level of local cities and school systems. After 1916, the federal government began to provide for vocational education funding as part of support for raising readiness to work in industrial and artisan jobs. In these years, states and religious bodies generally funded teacher training colleges, often called "normal schools". Gradually they developed full four-year curriculums and developed as state colleges after 1945.

Teachers organized themselves during the 1920s and 1930s. In 1917, the National Education Association (NEA) was reorganized to better mobilize and represent teachers and educational staff. The rate of increase in membership was constant under the chairmanship of James Crabtree—from 8,466 members in 1917 to 220,149 in 1931. The rival American Federation of Teachers (AFT) was based in large cities and formed alliances with the local labor unions. The NEA identified as an upper-middle-class professional organization, while the AFT identified with the working class and the union movement.

=== Great Society ===
When liberals regained control of Congress in 1964, they passed numerous Great Society programs supported by President Lyndon B. Johnson to expand federal support for education. The Higher Education Act of 1965 set up federal scholarships and low-interest loans for college students, and subsidized better academic libraries, ten to twenty new graduate centers, several new technical institutes, classrooms for several hundred thousand students, and twenty-five to thirty new community colleges a year. A separate education bill enacted that same year provided similar assistance to dental and medical schools. On an even larger scale, the Elementary and Secondary Education Act of 1965 began pumping federal money into local school districts.

=== Segregation and integration ===
Segregation laws in the United States prior to Brown v. Board of Education

For much of its history, education in the United States was segregated (or even only available) based upon race. Early integrated schools such as the Noyes Academy, founded in 1835, in Canaan, New Hampshire, often were met with fierce local opposition. For the most part, African Americans received very little to no formal education before the Civil War. Some free blacks in the North managed to become literate. In cities, such a Philadelphia and New York City, they founded literary societies for self-education, as well as some academies for their children. The most prominent of the latter was Philadelphia's Institute for Colored Youth, the nation's first coeducational high school for African Americans. A few institutions of higher education also were available to African Americans in the North. The Oneida Institute of Science and Industry was the first such entity to recruit and commonly admit African American men. New York Central College also was mixed race, and Oberlin College was the first B.A. degree-granting, white college to accept African Americans. In 1840, Oberlin bestowed the first known B.A. degree on an African American--George B. Vashon, who later was a founding member of the Howard University faculty.

In the South where slavery was legal, many states had laws prohibiting teaching enslaved African Americans to read or write. A few taught themselves, sometimes in secret schools, others learned from white playmates or more generous masters, but most were not able to learn to read and write. Schools for free people of color were privately run and supported, as were most of the limited schools for white children. Poor white children did not attend school. The wealthier planters hired tutors for their children and sent them to private academies and colleges at the appropriate age.

During Reconstruction a coalition of freedmen and white Republicans in Southern state legislatures passed laws establishing public education. The Freedmen's Bureau was created as an agency of the military governments that managed Reconstruction. It set up schools in many areas and tried to help educate and protect freedmen during the transition after the war. With the notable exception of the desegregated public schools in New Orleans, the schools were segregated by race. By 1900 more than 30,000 black teachers had been trained and put to work in the South, and the literacy rate had climbed to more than 50%, a major achievement in little more than a generation.

Many colleges were set up for blacks; some were state schools like Booker T. Washington's Tuskegee Institute in Alabama, others were private ones subsidized by Northern missionary societies.

Although the African-American community quickly began litigation to challenge such provisions, in the 19th century Supreme Court challenges generally were not decided in their favor. The Supreme Court case of Plessy v. Ferguson (1896) upheld the segregation of races in schools as long as each race enjoyed parity in quality of education (the "separate but equal" principle). However, few black students received equal education. They suffered for decades from inadequate funding, outmoded or dilapidated facilities, and deficient textbooks (often ones previously used in white schools).

Starting in 1914 and going into the 1930s, Julius Rosenwald, a philanthropist from Chicago, established the Rosenwald Fund to provide seed money for matching local contributions and stimulating the construction of new schools for African American children, mostly in the rural South. He worked in association with Booker T. Washington and architects at Tuskegee University to have model plans created for schools and teacher housing. With the requirement that money had to be raised by both blacks and whites, and schools approved by local school boards (controlled by whites), Rosenwald stimulated construction of more than 5,000 schools built across the South. In addition to Northern philanthropy and state taxes, African Americans went to extraordinary efforts to raise money for such schools.

The Civil Rights Movement during the 1950s and 1960s helped publicize the inequities of segregation. In 1954, the Supreme Court in Brown v. Board of Education unanimously declared that separate facilities were inherently unequal and unconstitutional. By the 1970s segregated districts had practically vanished in the South.

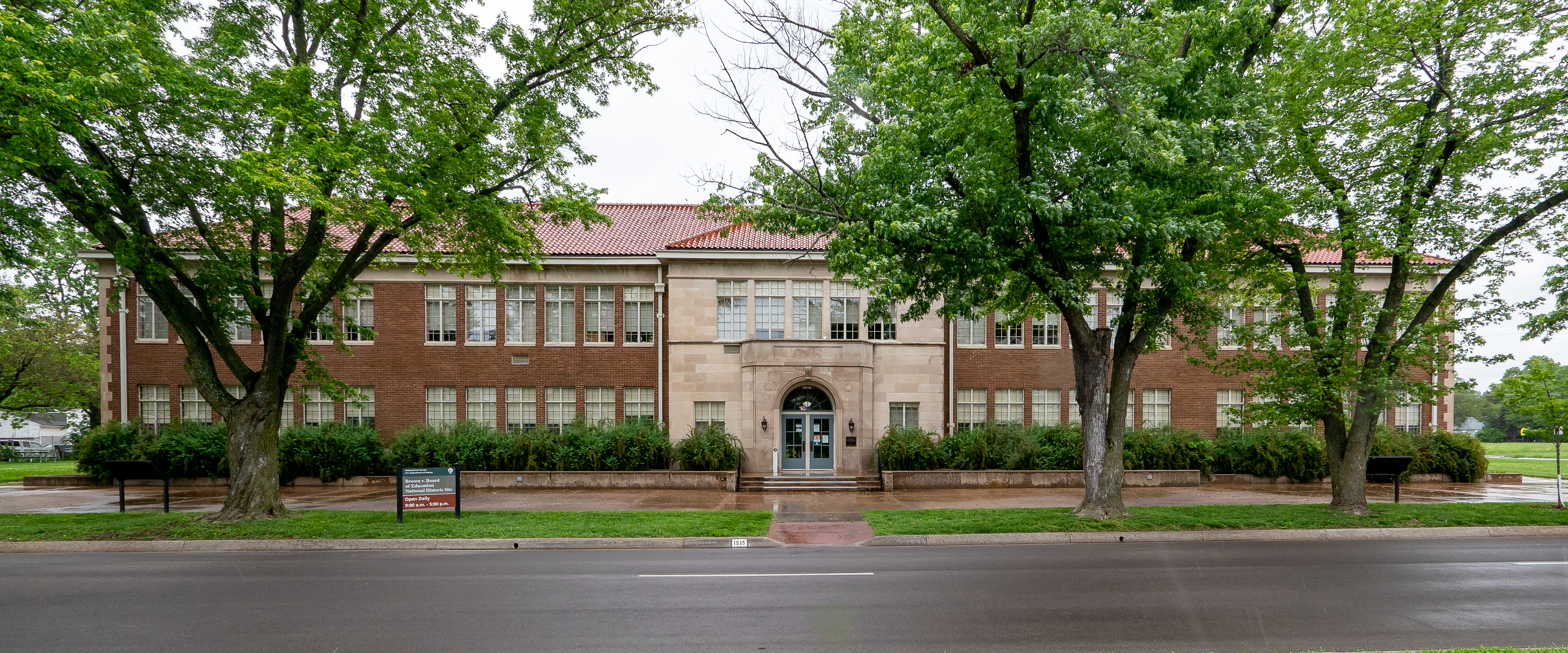
Monroe Elementary School, a formerly-segregated elementary school in Topeka, Kansas noted for its role in Brown v. Board of Education

Integration of schools has been a protracted process, however, with results affected by vast population migrations in many areas, and affected by suburban sprawl, the disappearance of industrial jobs, and movement of jobs out of former industrial cities of the North and Midwest and into new areas of the South. Although required by court order, integrating the first black students in the South met with intense opposition. In 1957 the integration of Central High School in Little Rock, Arkansas, had to be enforced by federal troops. President Dwight D. Eisenhower took control of the National Guard, after the governor tried to use them to prevent integration. Throughout the 1960s and 1970s, integration continued with varying degrees of difficulty. Some states and cities tried to overcome de facto segregation, a result of housing patterns, by using forced busing. This method of integrating student populations provoked resistance in many places, including northern cities, where parents wanted children educated in neighborhood schools.

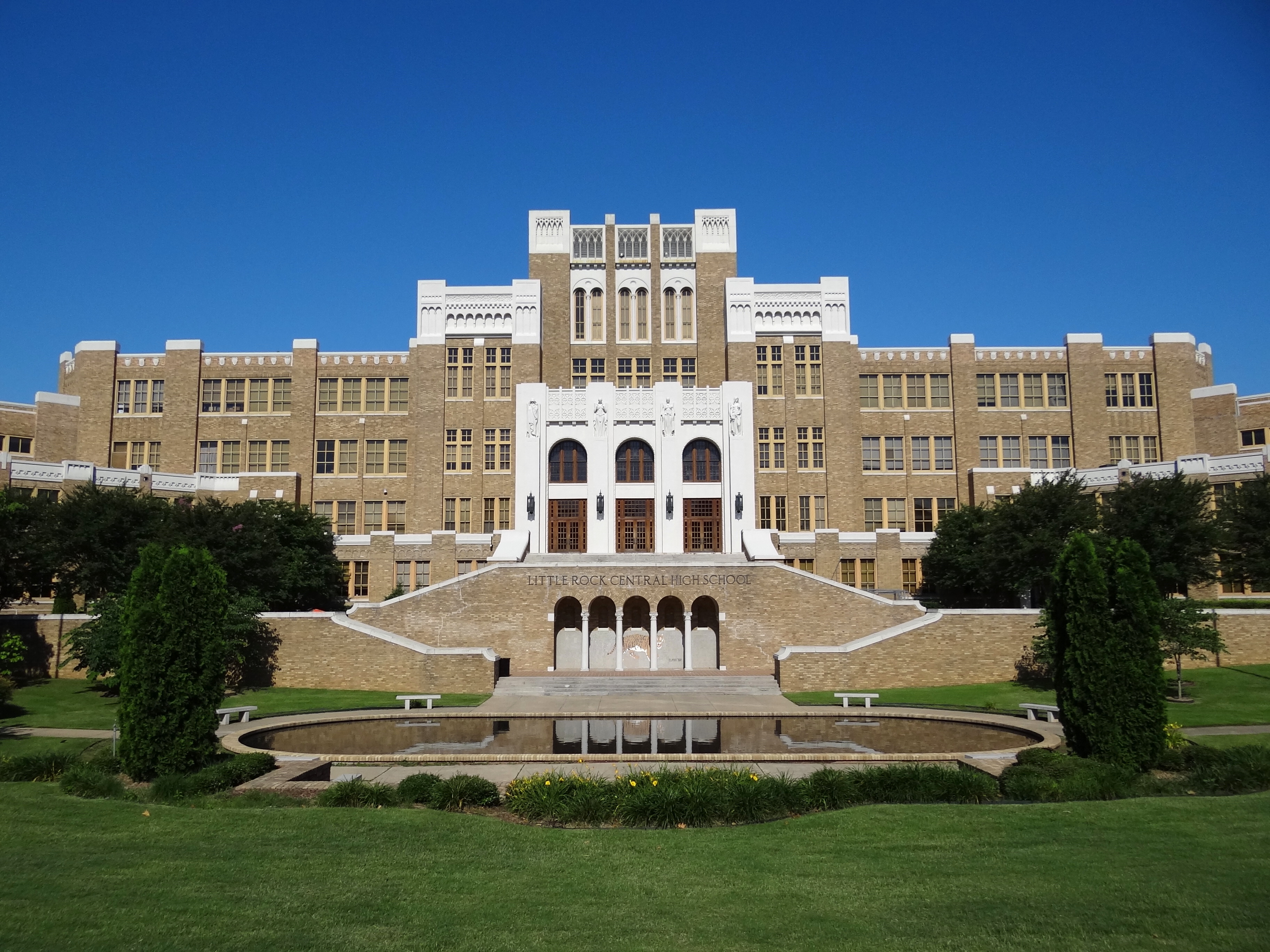
Little Rock Central High School became a focal point of the Little Rock Integration Crisis

Although full equality and parity in education has still to be achieved (many school districts are technically still under the integration mandates of local courts), technical equality in education had been achieved by 1970.

The federal government's integration efforts began to wane in the mid-1970s, and the Reagan and Bush Sr. administrations later launched several attacks against desegregation orders. As a result, school integration peaked in the 1980s and has been gradually declining ever since.

=== Education in the Mid-Twentieth Century ===
Many school reform efforts of the mid-twentieth century were driven by local school districts with the support of private philanthropy. For example, the All-Day Neighborhood Schools program in New York City, which provided additional teachers, after-school activities, social workers, and other improvements, operated from 1936 to 1971 as a partnership between the city's board of education and local philanthropists.

During this period, there was intense interest in using institutions to support the innate creativity of children. It helped reshape children's play, the design of suburban homes, schools, parks, and museums. Producers of children's television programming worked to spark creativity. Educational toys proliferated that were designed to teach skills or develop abilities. For schools there was a new emphasis on arts as well as science in the curriculum. School buildings no longer were monumental testimonies to urban wealth; they were redesigned with the students in mind.

The emphasis on creativity was reversed in the 1980s, as public policy emphasized test scores, school principals were forced to downplay art, drama, music, history and anything that was not being scored on standardized tests, lest their school be labelled "failing" by the quantifiers behind the "No Child Left Behind Act.

==== Inequality ====
The Coleman Report, by University of Chicago sociology professor James Coleman proved especially controversial in 1966. Based on massive statistical data, the 1966 report titled "Equality of Educational Opportunity" fueled debate about "school effects" that has continued since. The report was widely seen as evidence that school funding has little effect on student final achievement. A more precise reading of the Coleman Report is that student background and socioeconomic status are much more important in determining educational outcomes than are measured differences in school resources (i.e. per pupil spending). Coleman found that, on average, black schools were funded on a nearly equal basis by the 1960s, and that black students benefited from racially mixed classrooms.

The comparative quality of education among rich and poor districts is still often the subject of dispute. While middle class African-American children have made good progress; poor minorities have struggled. With school systems based on property taxes, there are wide disparities in funding between wealthy suburbs or districts, and often poor, inner-city areas or small towns. "De facto segregation" has been difficult to overcome as residential neighborhoods have remained more segregated than workplaces or public facilities. Racial segregation has not been the only factor in inequities. Residents in New Hampshire challenged property tax funding because of steep contrasts between education funds in wealthy and poorer areas. They filed lawsuits to seek a system to provide more equal funding of school systems across the state.

==== Special education ====
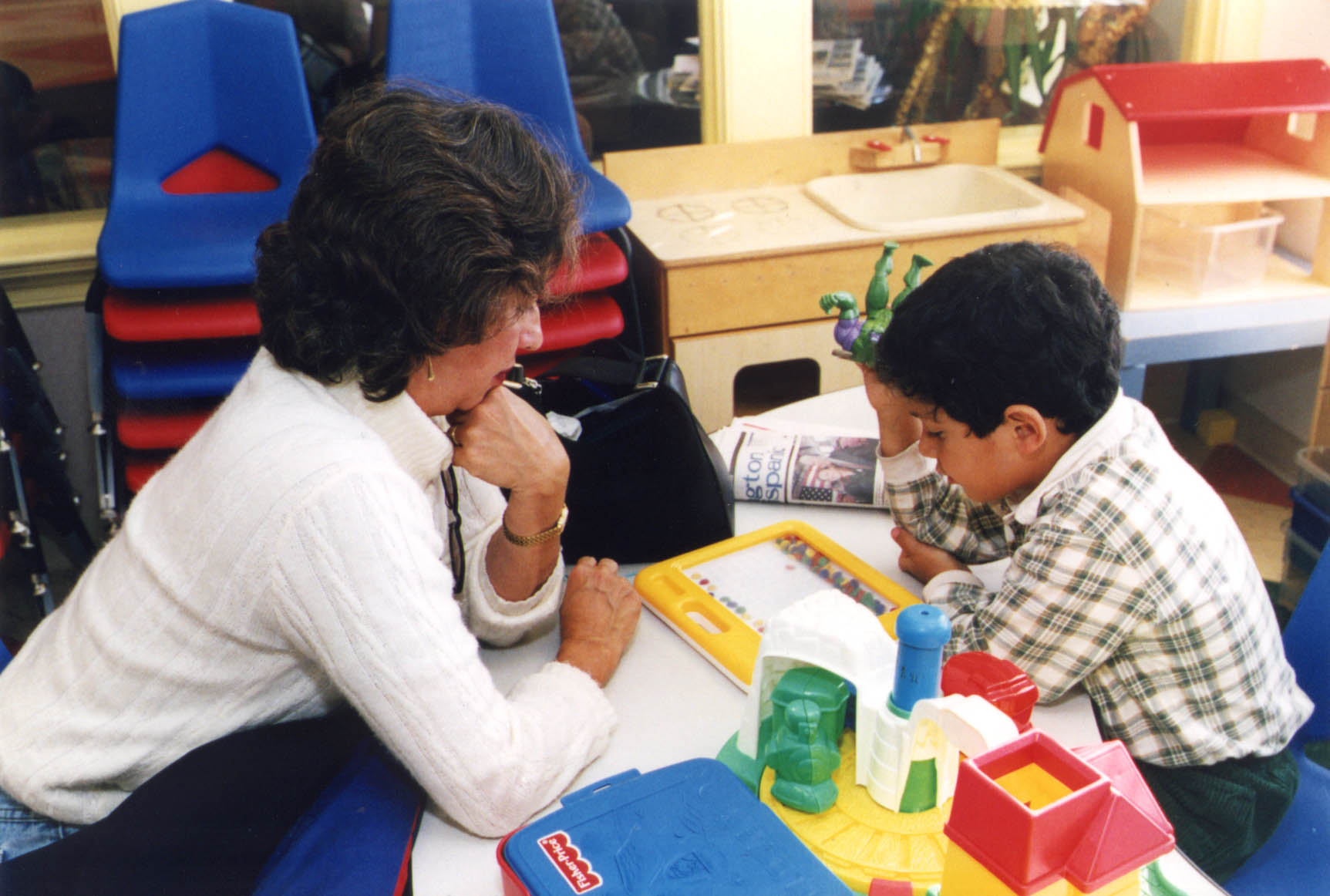
A special education teacher and student

In 1975 Congress passed Public Law 94–142, Education for All Handicapped Children Act. One of the most comprehensive laws in the history of education in the United States, this Act brought together several pieces of state and federal legislation, making free, appropriate education available to all eligible students with a disability. The law was amended in 1986 to extend its coverage to include younger children. In 1990 the Individuals with Disabilities Education Act (IDEA) extended its definitions and changed the label "handicap" to "disabilities". Further procedural changes were amended to IDEA in 1997.

=== Reform efforts in the 1980s ===
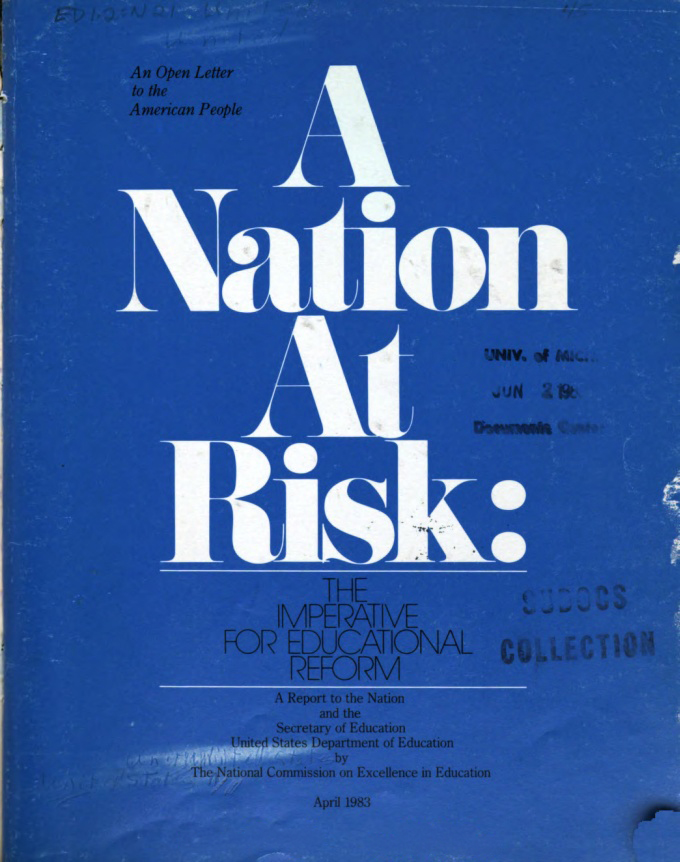
A Nation at Risk

In 1983, the National Commission on Excellence in Education released a report titled A Nation at Risk. Soon afterward, conservatives were calling for an increase in academic rigor including an increase in the number of school days per year, longer school days and higher testing standards. English scholar E.D. Hirsch made an influential attack on progressive education, advocating an emphasis on "cultural literacy"—the facts, phrases, and texts that Hirsch asserted are essential for decoding basic texts and maintaining communication. Hirsch's ideas remain influential in conservative circles into the 21st century. Hirsch's ideas have been controversial because as Edwards argues:

Opponents from the political left generally accuse Hirsch of elitism. Worse yet in their minds, Hirsch's assertion might lead to a rejection of toleration, pluralism, and relativism. On the political right, Hirsch has been assailed as totalitarian, for his idea lends itself to turning over curriculum selection to federal authorities and thereby eliminating the time-honored American tradition of locally controlled schools.

By 1990, the United States spent 2 percent of its budget on education, compared with 30 percent on support for the elderly.

== 21st century ==
As of the 2017–18 academic year, there are approximately 4,015,000 K–12 teachers in the United States (3,300,000 traditional public school teachers; 206,000 teachers in public charter schools; and 509,000 private school teachers).

=== Policy since 2000 ===
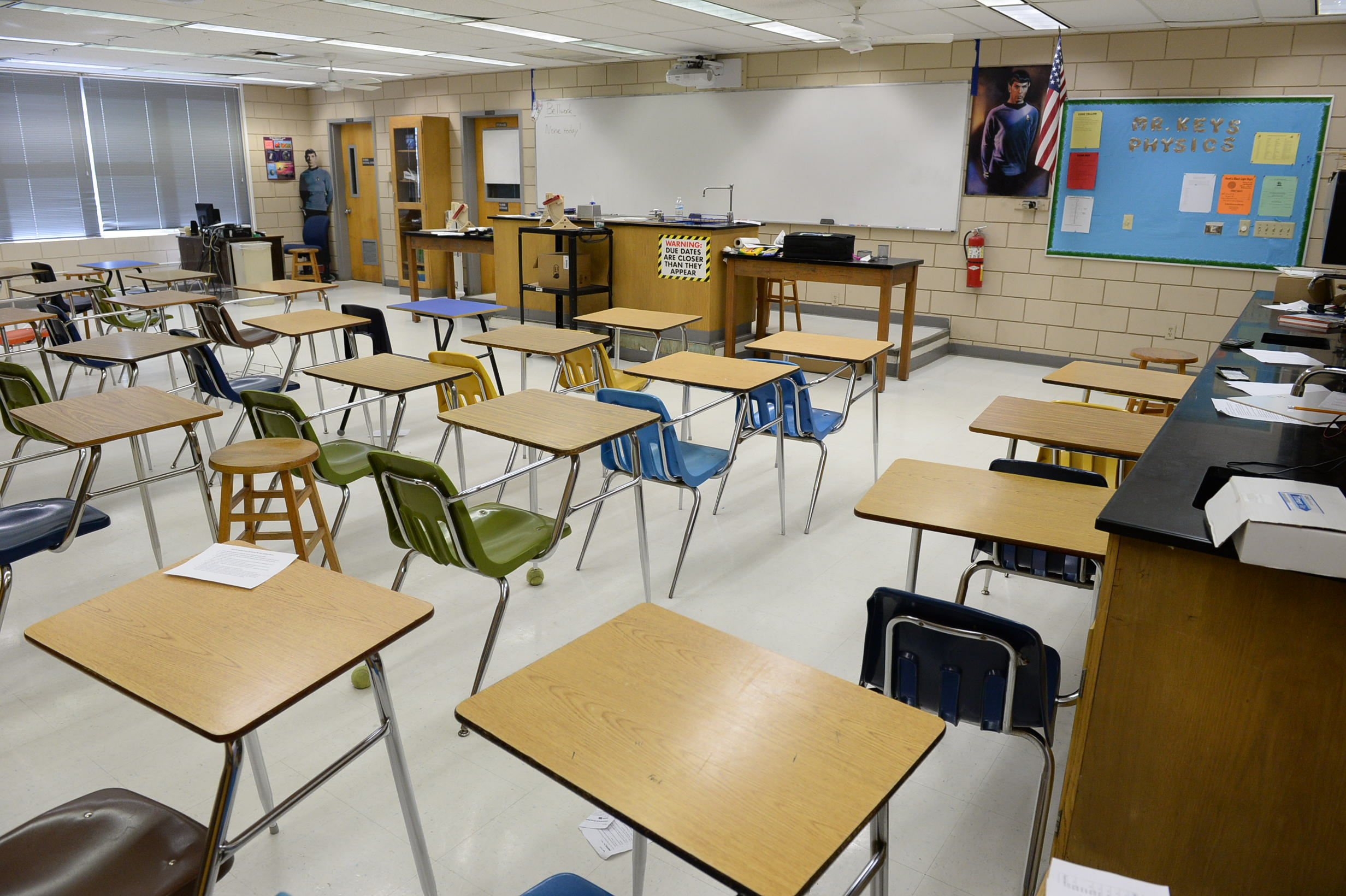
A high school physics classroom in 2015

"No Child Left Behind" was a major national law passed by a bipartisan coalition in Congress in 2002, marked a new direction. In exchange for more federal aid, the states were required to measure progress and punish schools that were not meeting the goals as measured by standardized state exams in math and language skills. By 2012, half the states were given waivers because the original goal that 100% students by 2014 be deemed "proficient" had proven unrealistic.

By 2012, 45 states had dropped the requirement to teach cursive writing from the curriculum. Continuing reports of a student's progress can be found online, supplementing the former method of periodic report cards.

By 2015, criticisms from a broad range of political ideologies had cumulated so far that a bipartisan Congress stripped away all the national features of No Child Left Behind, turning the remnants over to the states.

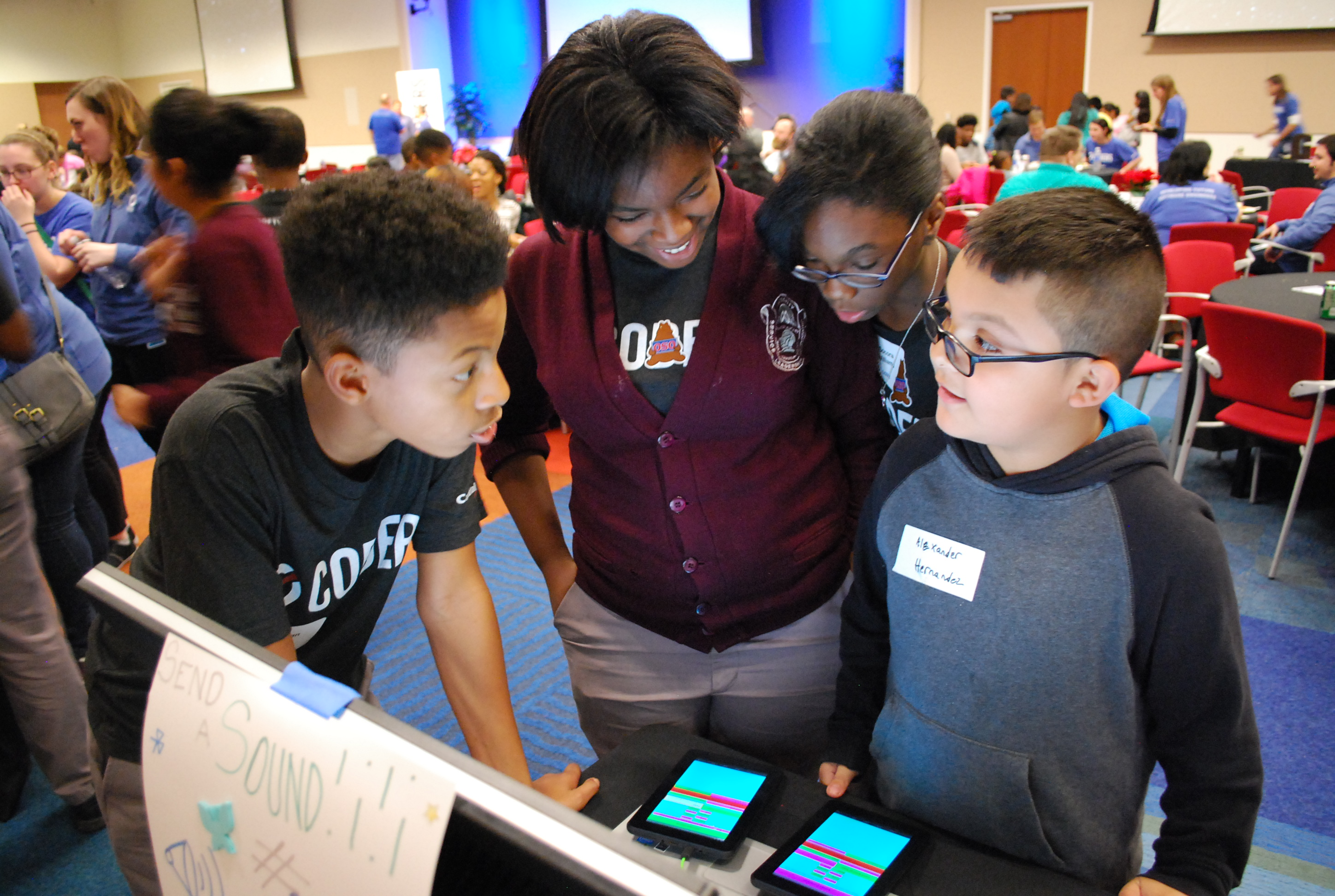
Students in Richmond participate in an Hour of Code event

Beginning in the 1980s, government, educators, and major employers issued a series of reports identifying key skills and implementation strategies to steer students and workers towards meeting the demands of the changing and increasingly digital workplace and society. 21st century skills are a series of higher-order skills, abilities, and learning dispositions that have been identified as being required for success in 21st century society and workplaces by educators, business leaders, academics, and governmental agencies. Many of these skills are also associated with deeper learning, including analytic reasoning, complex problem solving, and teamwork, compared to traditional knowledge-based academic skills. Many schools and school districts are adjusting learning environments, curricula, and learning spaces to include and support more active learning (such as experiential learning) to foster deeper learning and the development of 21st century skills.

A study by the Stanford Institute for Economic Policy Research observed a long-term decline in students' test scores between 2013 and 2026.

=== Career and technical education (CTE) ===
In the realm called "vocational education" before 2006, the Carl D. Perkins Career and Technical Education Act provides funding for "Career and Technical Education" (CTE) state programs. Congress enacted the first version in 1984 and it has been reauthorized multiple times, with the latest version being Perkins V, in 2018.

Key Features of Perkins V:

- Funding: Provides nearly $1.4 billion annually to support CTE programs.
- Flexibility: Allows states to tailor programs to meet local workforce needs.
- Work-Based Learning: Encourages apprenticeships and hands-on training.
- Comprehensive Needs Assessment: Requires schools to evaluate local industry demands.
- Teacher Recruitment & Retention: Supports efforts to attract and retain skilled educators.

== Higher education since 1860s ==
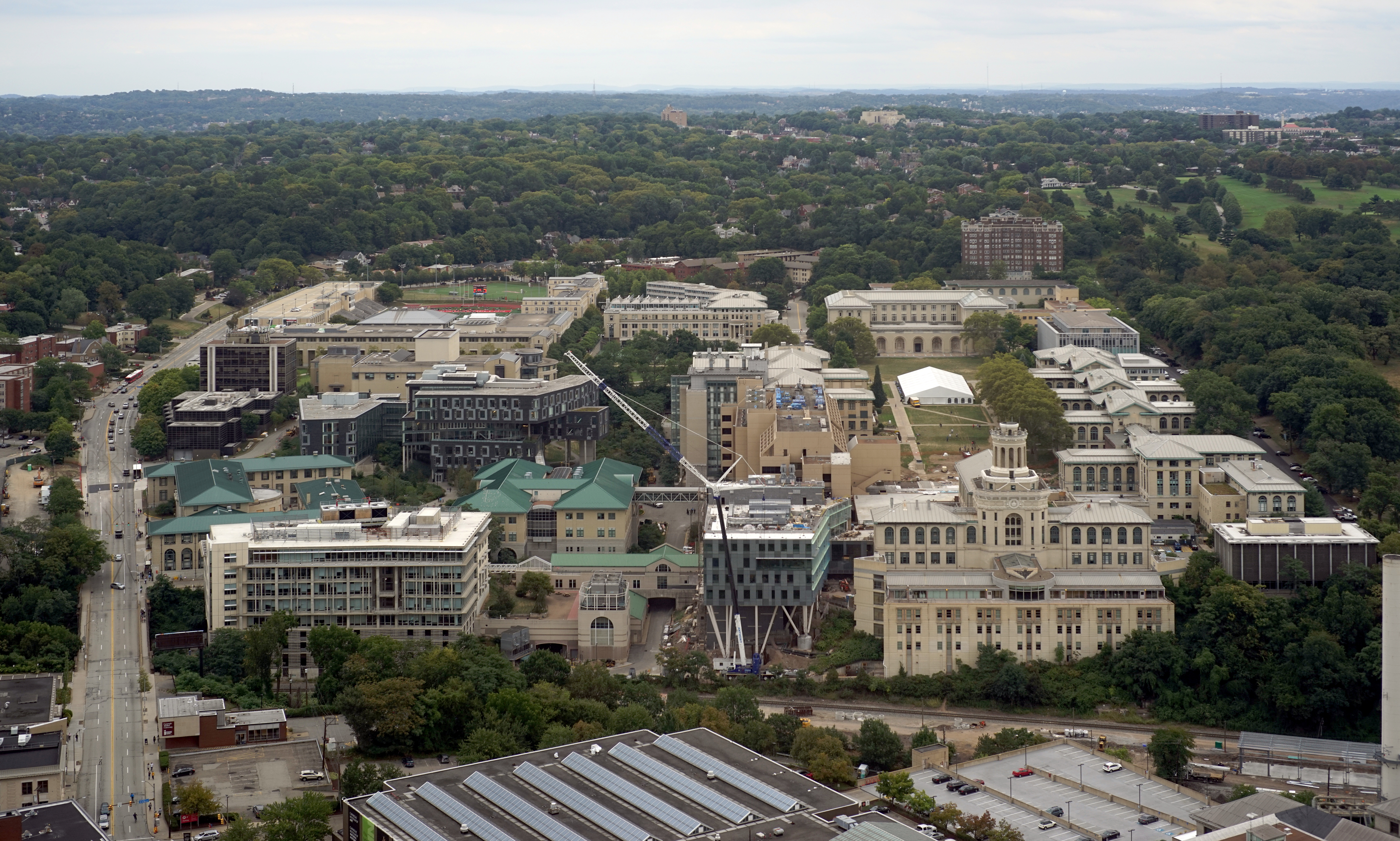
Carnegie Mellon University is one of a number of universities established by wealthy philanthropists at the close of the 19th century

Led by Harvard in the late 19th century, liberal arts colleges cut back on the rigid curriculum focused on Latin and Greek classics and gave students electives in various subjects, depending on the availability of faculty expertise. New courses appeared in the sciences, humanities, social sciences and the arts. Recitations became less common. Professors now lectured and gave exams.

At the beginning of the 20th century, about a thousand colleges taught about with 160,000 students. Explosive growth in the number of colleges occurred at the end of the 19th and early 20th centuries, supported in part by Congressional land grant programs.

=== Land Grant universities ===
Each state used federal funding from the Morrill Land-Grant Colleges Acts of 1862 and 1890 to set up "land grant colleges" "to teach such branches of learning as are related to agriculture and the mechanical arts" ("without excluding other sciences and classical studies"). The 1890 act required states that had segregation also to provide all-black land grant colleges, many of which ended up being dedicated primarily to teacher training. These colleges contributed to rural development, including the establishment of a traveling school program by Tuskegee Institute in 1906. Rural conferences sponsored by Tuskegee also attempted to improve the life of rural blacks. In the late 20th century, many of the schools established in 1890 have helped train students from less-developed countries to return home with the skills and knowledge to improve agricultural production.

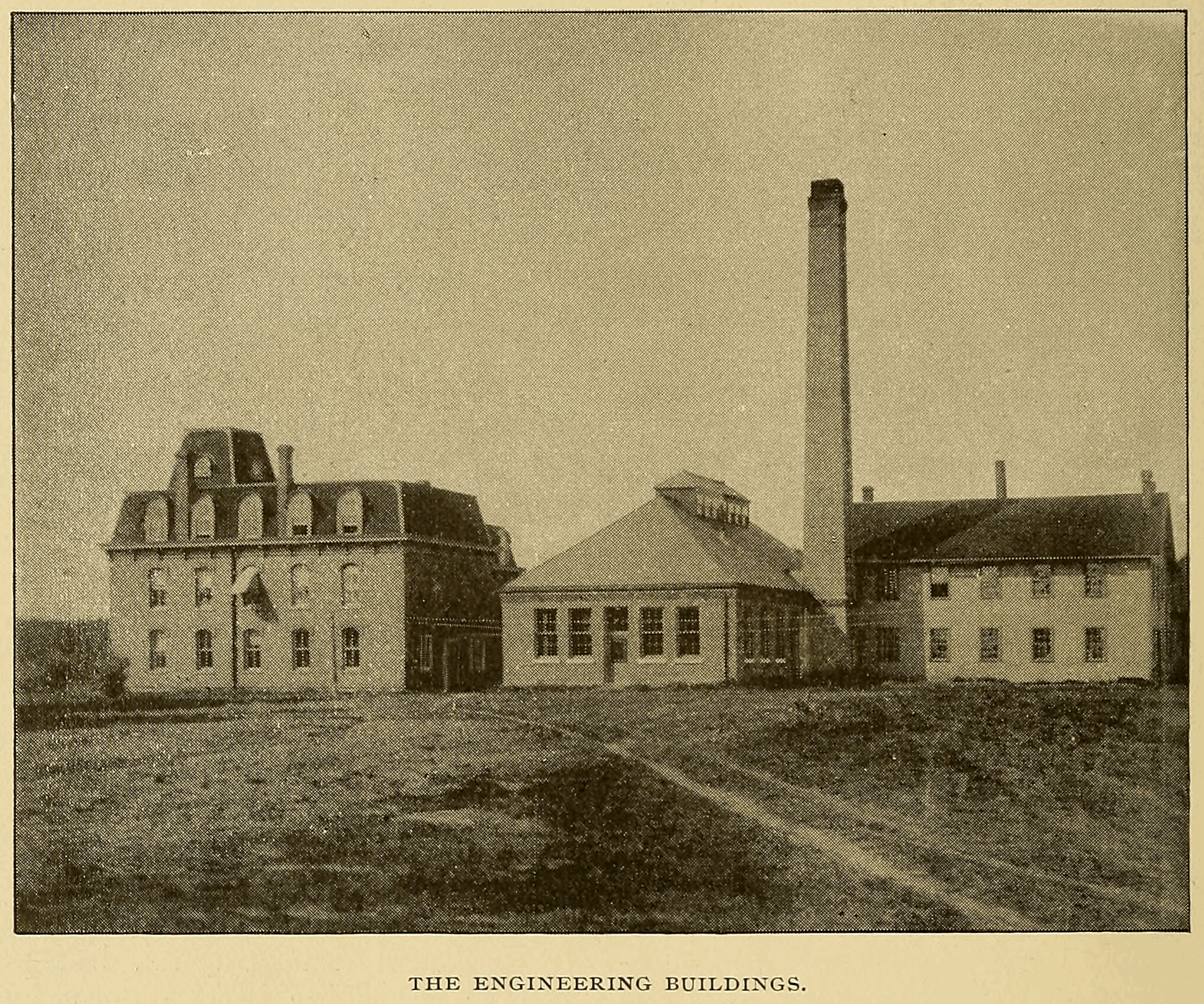
Iowa State University was the first designated land-grant institution in the U.S.

Iowa State University was the first existing school whose state legislature officially accepted the provisions of the Morrill Act on September 11, 1862. Other universities soon followed, such as Purdue University, Michigan State University, Kansas State University, Cornell University (in New York), Texas A&M University, Pennsylvania State University, The Ohio State University, and the University of California. Few alumni became farmers, but they did play an increasingly important role in the larger food industry, especially after the federal extension system was set up in 1916 that put trained agronomists in every agricultural county.

Engineering graduates played a major role in rapid technological development. The land-grant college system produced the agricultural scientists and industrial engineers who constituted the critical human resources of the managerial revolution in government and business, 1862–1917, laying the foundation of the world's pre-eminent educational infrastructure that supported the world's foremost technology-based economy.

Representative was Pennsylvania State University. The Farmers' High School of Pennsylvania (later the Agricultural College of Pennsylvania and then Pennsylvania State University), was chartered in 1855. Its mission was to uphold declining agrarian values and show farmers ways to prosper through more productive farming. Students were to build character and meet a part of their expenses by performing farm labor. By 1875 the compulsory labor requirement was dropped, but men were required to have an hour a day of military training. In the early years, the agricultural curriculum was not well developed, and politicians often considered the land-grant college a costly and useless experiment. The college was a center of middle-class values that served to help young people on their journey to white-collar occupations.

=== Emergence of the modern university ===
Many American scholars and scientists studied at German universities before 1914. They appreciated how Germany was the world leader in research and the PhD. They returned home eager to implement an American version of the Humboldtian model of higher education. The first results were exemplified at new universities and upgraded established schools like Harvard, Columbia and Wisconsin. Philanthropists endowed many of the research institutions including Cornell University, Johns Hopkins University, Stanford University, Carnegie Mellon University, Vanderbilt University and Duke University. John D. Rockefeller funded the University of Chicago without attaching his name to it. At the new schools (especially Cornell, Johns Hopkins, Chicago and Stanford), the undergraduate program was less important than the graduate school, but the tuition the students brought in was needed, and the undergraduate courses could be taught by graduate students. At the older schools, especially Yale and Columbia, the well-established undergraduate colleges persisted in the old classical model. At Columbia, for example, first elective anyone was allowed was the option for senior to take one semester of elementary calculus in place of semester eight of Greek. At Yale's undergraduate college the traditional classical curriculum reigned supreme—electives were made possible for additional work in Latin and Greek. Yale opened a separate college for undergraduates in science and engineering.

Historian Laurence Veysey in his book The Emergence of the American University (1965) explained how higher education was revolutionized in the late 19th century by the creation of the modern university. Stressing Johns Hopkins, Cornell, Clark, Harvard, Yale, Columbia, Michigan, Chicago, Stanford and Berkeley, Veysey showed how the newly created and newly reformed schools were influenced by German approaches that taught new findings based on experimental and empirical research techniques. The new model rejected the British model that reiterated over and over the Latin and Greek classics. The new university introduced new teaching methods such as lectures and seminars. It made graduate school training, culminating in the PhD, the mark of the true scholar. The doctoral dissertation required students to create new knowledge, preferably through experimental methods or research in original sources. The new land grant state universities generally followed the new model and deemphasized classical Latin and Greek white adding science, technology, industrial engineering and agricultural science.

=== GI Bill after 1945 ===
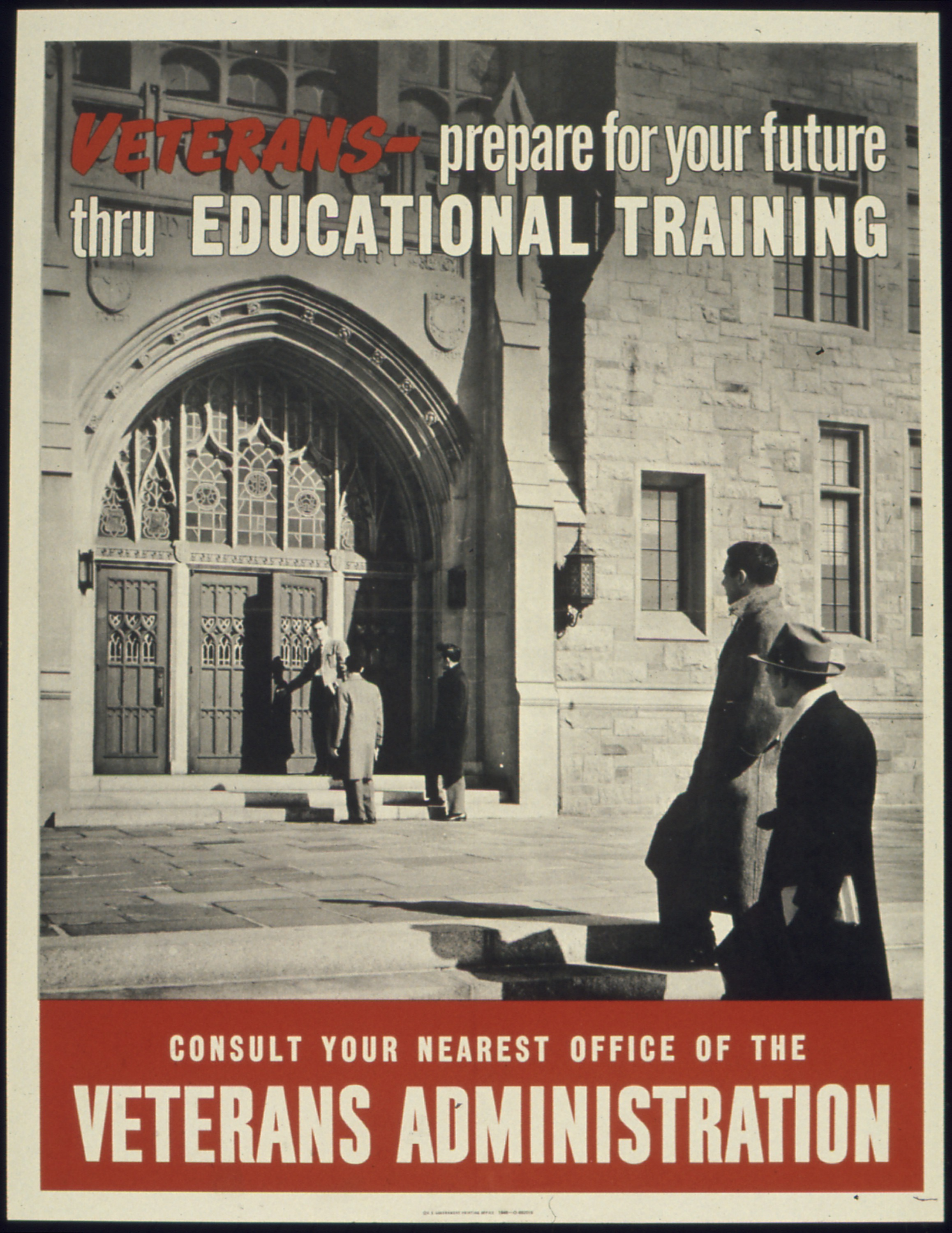
A 1944 poster encouraging veterans to use the GI Bill

Rejecting liberal calls for large-scale aid to education, Congress in 1944 passed a massive program of aid limited to veterans who had served in World War II. These were grants that did not have to be repaid. Daniel Brumberg and Farideh Farhi state, "The expansive and generous postwar education benefits of the GI Bill were due not to Roosevelt's progressive vision but to the conservative American Legion." The GI Bill made college education possible for millions by paying tuition and living expenses. The government provided between $800 and $1,400 each year to these veterans as a subsidy to attend college, which covered 50–80% of total costs. This included foregone earnings in addition to tuition, which allowed them to have enough funds for life outside of school. The GI Bill helped create a widespread belief in the necessity of college education. It opened up higher education to ambitious young men who would otherwise have been forced to immediately enter the job market after being discharged from the military. When comparing college attendance rates between veterans and non-veterans during this period, veterans were found to be 10% more likely to go to college than non-veterans.

In the early decades after the bill was passed, most campuses became heavily male thanks to the GI Bill, since only 2% of wartime veterans were women. But by 2000, female veterans had grown in numbers and began passing men in rates of college and graduate school attendance.

== Historiography ==
For much of the 20th century, the dominant historiography, as exemplified by Ellwood Patterson Cubberley at Stanford, emphasized the rise of American education as a powerful force for literacy, democracy, and equal opportunity, and a firm basis for higher education and advanced research institutions. Cubberley argued that the foundations of the modern education system were influenced by processes of democratization in Europe and the United States. It was a story of enlightenment and modernization triumphing over ignorance, cost-cutting, and narrow traditionalism whereby parents tried to block their children's intellectual access to the wider world. Teachers dedicated to the public interest, reformers with a wide vision, and public support from the civic-minded community were the heroes. The textbooks help inspire students to become public schools teachers and thereby fulfill their own civic mission.

New evidence from historical education trends challenges Cubberley's assertion that the spread of democracy led to the expansion of public primary education. While the U.S. was one of the world leaders in the provision of primary education during the late-19th century, so was Prussia, an absolutist regime. Democratization appears to have no effect on levels of access to primary education around the world, based on an analysis of historical student enrollment rates for 109 countries from 1820 to 2010.

The crisis came in the 1960s, when a new generation of New Left scholars and students rejected the traditional celebratory accounts, and identified the educational system as the villain for many of America's weaknesses, failures, and crimes. Michael Katz states they:

tried to explain the origins of the Vietnam War; the persistence of racism and segregation; the distribution Of power among gender and classes; intractable poverty and the decay of cities; and the failure of social institutions and policies designed to deal with mental illness, crime, delinquency, and education.

The old guard fought back in bitter historiographical contests. The younger scholars largely promoted the proposition that schools were not the solution to America's ills, they were in part the cause of Americans problems. The fierce battles of the 1960s died out by the 1990s, but enrollment declined sharply in education history courses and never recovered.

Most histories of education deal with institutions or focus on the ideas histories of major reformers, but a new social history has recently emerged, focused on who were the students in terms of social background and social mobility. Attention has often focused on minority, and ethnic students. The social history of teachers has also been studied in depth.

Historians have recently looked at the relationship between schooling and urban growth by studying educational institutions as agents in class formation, relating urban schooling to changes in the shape of cities, linking urbanization with social reform movements, and examining the material conditions affecting child life and the relationship between schools and other agencies that socialize the young.

The most economics-minded historians have sought to relate education to changes in the quality of labor, productivity and economic growth, and rates of return on investment in education. It is very important to keep in mind that during the gradual progression of history, the focus of the country's changes with each elected president. Historians now ask the questions of what economics was the center of the thought process in the first besides driving capitalistic gain. A major recent exemplar is Claudia Goldin and Lawrence F. Katz, The Race between Education and Technology (2009), on the social and economic history of 20th-century American schooling.

== See also ==
- History of African-American education
- History of childhood in the United States
- History of higher education in the United States
- History of Catholic education in the United States
- History of education in California
- History of education in Chicago
- History of education in Massachusetts
- History of education in Missouri
- History of education in New York City
- History of education in the Southern United States
- History of education in Texas
- Education reform
- Education policy of the United States, for role of national government
- History of school counseling in the United States
- Normal schools in the United States, historical coverage of teacher training in major states
- Thomas Jefferson and education
- Vocational education in the United States
  - Smith–Hughes Act of 1917
  - Carl D. Perkins Vocational and Technical Education Act of 1984
- Women's education in the United States
