= Mabel Dodge Luhan =

American patron of the arts (1879–1962)

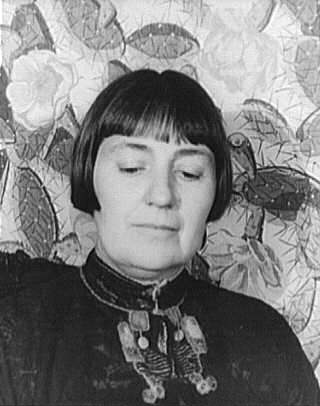
- Portrait of Mabel Dodge Luhan by Carl Van Vechten, 1934.
- Born: Mabel Ganson; February 26, 1879; Buffalo, New York, U.S.
- Died: August 13, 1962 (aged 83); Taos, New Mexico, U.S.
- Occupations: Patron of the arts; nationally syndicated columnist for the Hearst organization
- Organization(s): Taos art colony, Armory Show
- Spouse(s): Karl Evans (m. 1900; died 1902); Edwin Dodge (m. 1904; div. 1916); Maurice Sterne (m. 1916; div. 1921) Tony Lujan (m. 1923)

Mabel Evans Dodge Sterne Luhan (pronounced LOO-hahn; née Ganson; February 26, 1879 – August 13, 1962) was an American memoirist and patron of the arts, who was particularly associated with the Taos art colony.

== Early life ==
Mabel Ganson was the heiress of Charles Ganson, a wealthy banker from Buffalo, New York, and his wife, Sara Cook. Raised to charm and groomed to marry, she grew up among Buffalo's social elite, raised in the company of her nursemaid. She attended Saint Margaret's Episcopal School for girls until the age of sixteen, then went to school in New York City. In 1896, she toured Europe and attended the 'Chevy Chase' finishing school in Washington, D.C.

== Career ==
=== Florence ===
In 1904, Luhan married her second husband, Edwin Dodge. Between 1905 and 1912, Edwin and Mabel lived near Florence at her palatial Medici villa, the Villa Curonia in Arcetri, where she entertained local artists, in addition to Gertrude Stein, her brother Leo, Alice B. Toklas, and other visitors from Paris, including André Gide. A troubled liaison with her chauffeur led to two suicide attempts: the first by eating figs containing shards of glass; the second with laudanum.

=== New York and Provincetown ===
In mid-1912, the Dodges (by this time increasingly estranged), returned to America where Dodge set herself up as a patron of the arts, holding a weekly salon in her new apartment at 23 Fifth Avenue in Greenwich Village. Notable guests included Carl Van Vechten, Avery Hopwood, Margaret Sanger, Emma Goldman, Charles Demuth, "Big Bill" Haywood, Max Eastman, Lincoln Steffens, Hutchins Hapgood, Neith Boyce, Walter Lippmann, and John Reed. Van Vechten took Dodge as the model for the character "Edith Dale" in his novel Peter Whiffle. Anthropologist Raymond Harrington introduced Dodge and her friends to peyote in an impromptu "ceremony" there.

She was involved in mounting the Armory Show of new European Modern Art in 1913, publishing and distributing in pamphlet-form a piece by Gertrude Stein titled "Portrait of Mabel Dodge at the Villa Curonia", which increased her public profile.

She sailed to Europe at the end of June 1913. John Reed (Jack) — worn out from having recently organized the Paterson Pageant — traveled with her. They became lovers after arriving in Paris, where they socialized with Stein and Pablo Picasso before leaving for the Villa Curonia, where the guests included Arthur Rubinstein. At first this was a very happy time for the couple, but tensions grew between them as Reed became uncomfortable with the affluent isolation, and Dodge saw his interests in the world of people and achievements as a rejection of her. They returned to New York in late September 1913. In October, Reed was sent to report on the Mexican Revolution by Metropolitan Magazine. Although Dodge followed him to the border town of Presidio, she left after just a few days.

Between 1914 and 1916, a strong connection developed between the intelligentsia of Greenwich Village and Provincetown and, in 1915, Dodge arrived there with painter Maurice Sterne. While in Provincetown, John Reed helped to organize The Provincetown Players, and Dodge experienced a rivalry with Mary Heaton Vorse.

In 1916, Dodge became a nationally syndicated columnist for the Hearst organization, relocating to Finney Farm, a large Croton estate. Sterne, who was to become Dodge's third husband, lived in a cottage behind the main house, while Dodge offered Reed the third floor of the house as a writing studio. Although he moved in for a short period, the situation became untenable; Dodge and Sterne married later that year.

=== Santa Barbara ===
During this period Dodge also began spending long periods of time in Santa Barbara, California, where her friend Lincoln Steffens had relatives. (Lincoln Steffens' sister Lottie was married to local rancher John J. Hollister).

=== Taos ===
In 1917, Dodge, her husband Maurice Sterne, and Elsie Clews Parsons moved to Taos, New Mexico, where she began a literary colony. On the advice of Tony Lujan, a Native American whom she would marry in 1923, she purchased a 12-acre (49,000 m^{2}) property. Lujan set up a teepee in front of her house, drumming each night in an attempt to lure her to him. Although Sterne bought a shotgun with the intention of chasing Lujan off the property, he was unable to use it. He took to insulting his wife Mabel, who, in response, sent Sterne away, although she supported him financially until the time of their divorce four years later.

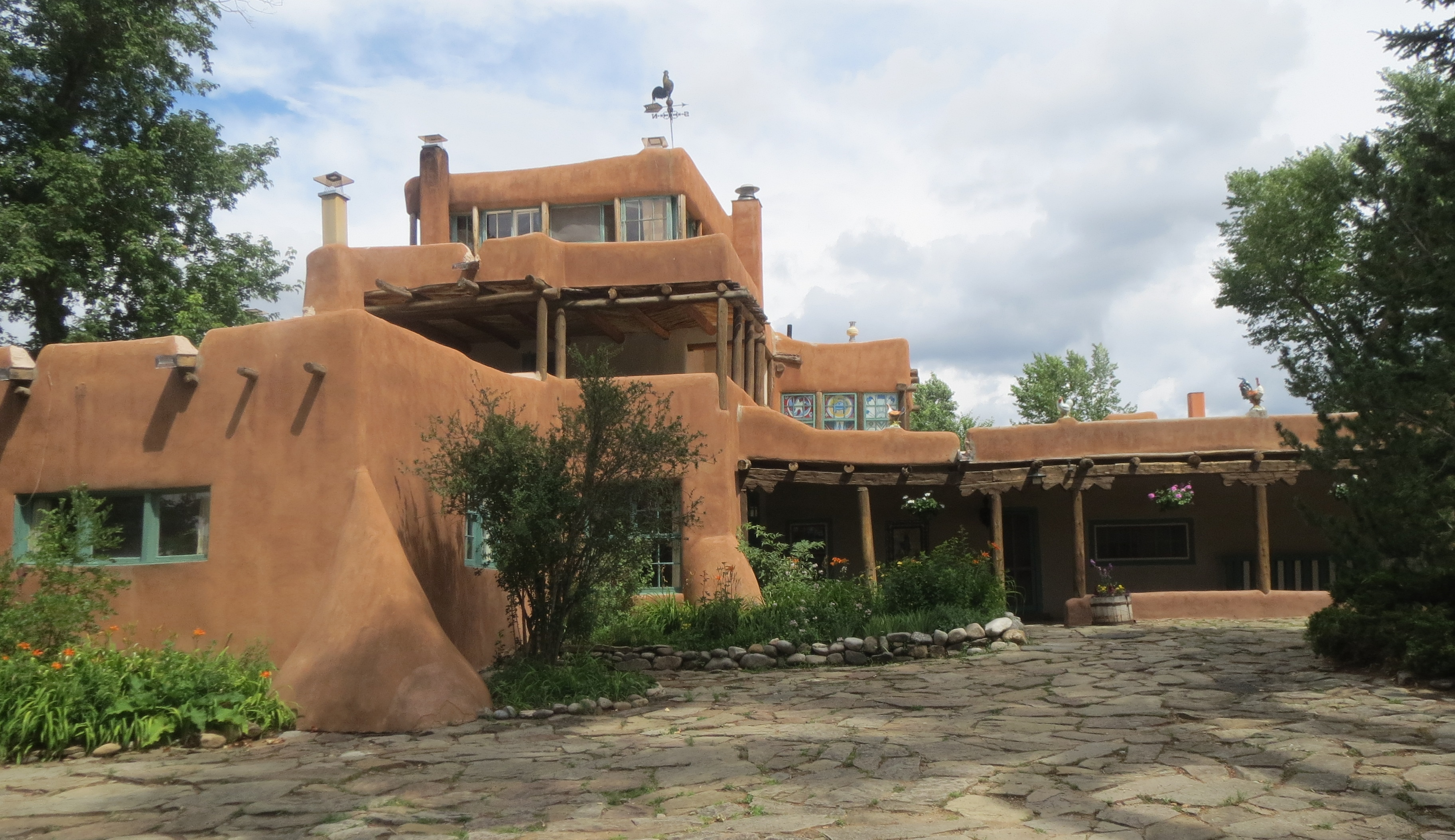
Mabel Dodge Luhan's home in Taos.

D. H. Lawrence, the English author, accepted an invitation from her to stay in Taos, arriving with his wife, Frieda, in early September 1922. He had a fraught relationship with his hostess, later writing about it in his fiction. Dodge later published a memoir about the visit entitled, Lorenzo in Taos (1932). Editor and book designer Merle Armitage also wrote a book about this time in New Mexico. Taos Quartet in Three Movements was originally to appear in Flair Magazine, but the magazine folded before its publication. This short work describes the tumultuous relationship of D. H. Lawrence, his wife Frieda, artist Dorothy Brett and Mabel Dodge Sterne. Armitage took it upon himself to print 16 hardcover copies of this work for his friends. Richard Pousette-Dart executed the drawings for Taos Quartet that was published in 1950.

In New Mexico, Dodge and Lujan hosted influential artists and poets, including Marsden Hartley, Arnold Ronnebeck, Louise Emerson Ronnebeck, Ansel Adams, Willa Cather, Walter Van Tilburg Clark, Robinson Jeffers and his wife Una, Florence McClung, Georgia O'Keeffe, Nicolai Fechin, Mary Hunter Austin, Mary Foote, Frank Waters, Jaime de Angulo, Aldous Huxley, Ernie O'Malley and others.

Dodge died at her home in Taos in 1962 and was buried in Kit Carson Cemetery. The Mabel Dodge Luhan House has been designated a National Historic Landmark, operating as an historic inn and conference center. Natalie Goldberg frequently teaches at Mabel Dodge Luhan House, which Dennis Hopper bought after having noticed it while filming Easy Rider.

== Archives ==
The Mabel Dodge Luhan Papers Collection—a collection of letters, manuscripts, photographs and personal papers documenting Dodge's life and works—is housed at the Beinecke Library at Yale University. A portion of the collection is available online. Patricia R. Everett has edited and published archival publications on Dodge's life, including her dream diary (with analysis by Smith Ely Jelliffe) and her correspondences with Abraham Brill and Gertrude Stein.

There is a portrait of Luhan by Nicholai Fechin (1881-1955) painted in 1927, oil on canvas, included in the American Museum for Western Art — The Anschutz Collection.

== Personal life ==
Her first marriage, in 1900 at the age of 21, was to Karl Evans, the son of a steamboat company owner, Anchor Line Steamboat Co. They were married in secret because her father Charles Ganson did not approve of Evans, and they later remarried in Trinity Church before Buffalo society. They had one son. Karl died in a hunting accident two-and-a-half years later, leaving her a widow at 23. In the spring of 1904, an oval portrait of her in mourning dress was painted by the Swiss-born American artist Adolfo Müller-Ury for her paternal grandmother, Nancy Ganson of Delaware Avenue, Buffalo. Her family sent her to Paris after she began an affair with a prominent Buffalo gynecologist. In November 1904, she married Edwin Dodge, a wealthy architect.

In 1916 she married the artist and sculptor Maurice Sterne; the union lasted until their divorce in 1921 (sometimes cited as 1922) and took her from New York to Taos, New Mexico, where she and Sterne purchased property and launched the beginnings of her salon there.

In 1923 she married Antonio "Tony". Lujan (later styling his name "Luhan"), a member of the Taos Pueblo, to whom she remained married until her death in 1962.

She was also actively bisexual in her early life and frankly detailed her physical encounters with women in her autobiography Intimate Memories (1933).

== Bibliography ==
- Lorenzo in Taos: D. H. Lawrence and Mabel Dodge Luhan (1932)
- Intimate Memoirs: Background (1933)
- European Experiences (1935)
- Winter in Taos (1935)
- Movers and Shakers (1936)
- Winter in Taos (1935)
- Edge of Taos Desert: An Escape to Reality (1937)
- Taos and Its Artists (1947)
- Una and Robin (1976)

Luhan's 1935 book Winter in Taos is listed among the 100 Best Books in New Mexico (January 6, 2011).
