= Anarchism and education =

Anarchism has had a special interest on the issue of education from the works of William Godwin and Max Stirner onwards.

A wide diversity of issues related to education have gained the attention of anarchist theorists and activists. They have included the role of education in social control and socialization, the rights and liberties of youth and children within educational contexts, the inequalities encouraged by current educational systems, the influence of state and religious ideologies in the education of people, the division between social and manual work and its relationship with education, sex education and art education.

Various alternatives to contemporary mainstream educational systems and their problems have been proposed by anarchists which have gone from alternative education systems and environments, self-education, advocacy of youth and children rights, and freethought activism.

== Early anarchist views on education ==
Max Stirner was a German philosopher linked mainly with the anarchist school of thought known as individualist anarchism who worked as a schoolteacher in a gymnasium for young girls. He examines the subject of education directly in his long essay The False Principle of our Education. In that essay he deals with the debates between realist and humanistic educational commentators and reflects that both consider the learner as something to be acted upon rather than someone to be encouraged towards self-realization.

Josiah Warren is widely regarded as the first American anarchist. "Where utopian projectors starting with Plato entertained the idea of creating an ideal species through eugenics and education and a set of universally valid institutions inculcating shared identities, Warren wanted to dissolve such identities in a solution of individual self-sovereignty. His educational experiments, for example, possibly under the influence of the...Swiss educational theorist Johann Heinrich Pestalozzi (via Robert Owen), emphasized—as we would expect—the nurturing of the independence and the conscience of individual children, not the inculcation of pre-conceived values."

== Early 20th century ==
=== Francisco Ferrer and Modern schools ===
In 1901, Catalan anarchist and free-thinker Francisco Ferrer established "modern" or progressive schools in Barcelona in defiance of an educational system controlled by the Catholic Church. The schools' stated goal was to "educate the working class in a rational, secular and non-coercive setting". Fiercely anti-clerical, Ferrer believed in education free from the authority of church and state. La Escuela Moderna, and Ferrer's ideas generally, formed the inspiration for a series of Modern Schools in the United States, Cuba, South America and London.

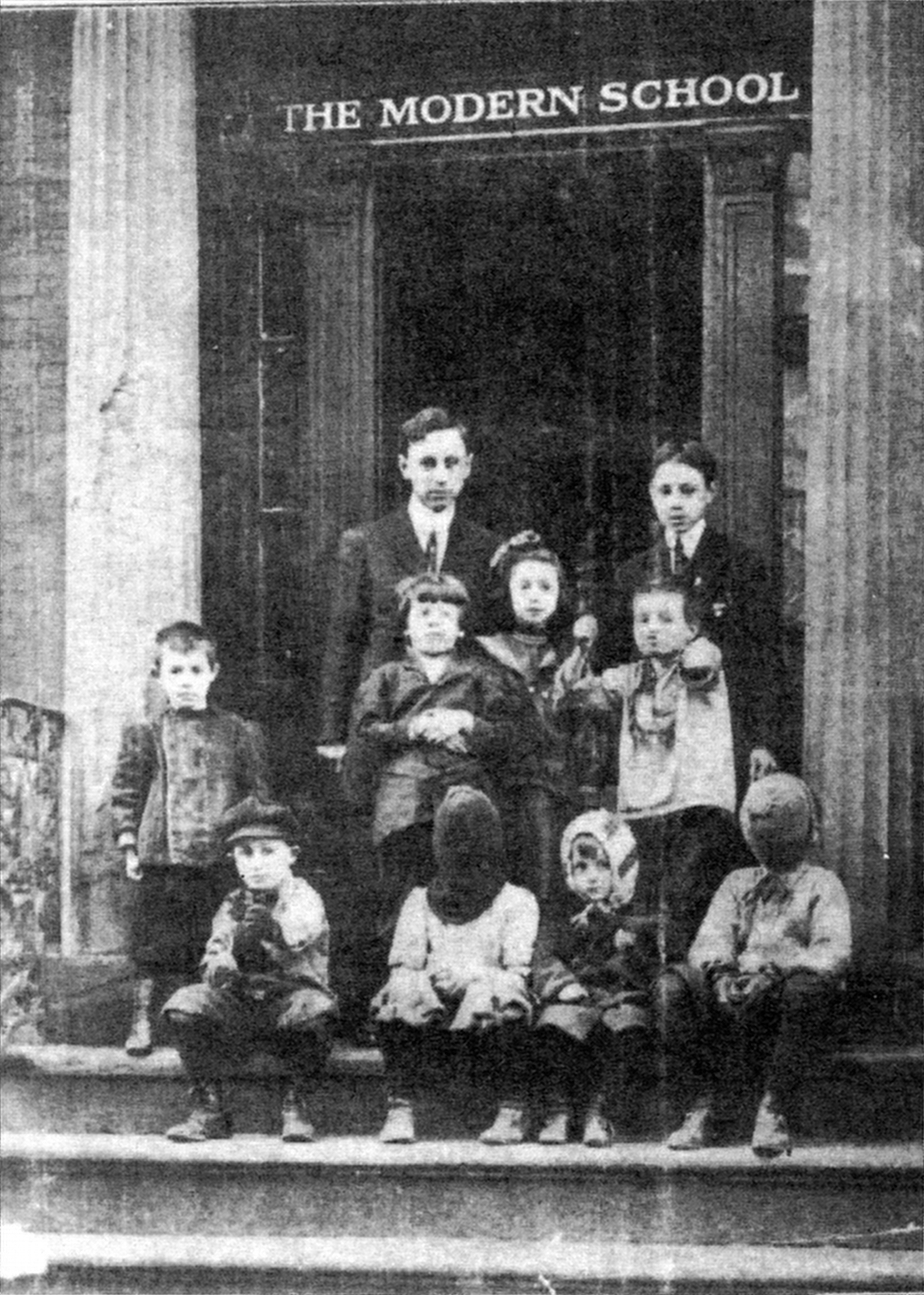
The NYC Modern School, ca. 1911–1912, Principal Will Durant and pupils. This photograph was the cover of the first issue of The Modern School magazine.

The first, and most notable, of the Modern Schools was founded in New York City, in 1911, two years after Francisco Ferrer i Guàrdia's execution for sedition in monarchist Spain on 18 October 1909. Commonly called the Ferrer Center, it was founded by notable anarchists — including Leonard Abbott, Alexander Berkman, Voltairine de Cleyre, and Emma Goldman — first meeting on St. Mark's Place, in Manhattan's Lower East Side, but twice moved elsewhere, first within lower Manhattan, then to Harlem. The Ferrer Center opened with only nine students, one being the son of Margaret Sanger, the contraceptives-rights activist. Starting in 1912, the school's principal was the philosopher Will Durant, who also taught there. Besides Berkman and Goldman, the Ferrer Center faculty included the Ashcan School painters Robert Henri and George Bellows, and its guest lecturers included writers and political activists such as Margaret Sanger, Jack London, and Upton Sinclair. Student Magda Schoenwetter, recalled that the school used Montessori methods and equipment, and emphasised academic freedom rather than fixed subjects, such as spelling and arithmetic.

After the 4 July 1914 Lexington Avenue bombing, the police investigated and several times raided the Ferrer Center and other labor and anarchist organisations in New York City. Acknowledging the urban danger to their school, the organizers bought 68 acres (275,000 m^{2}) in Piscataway Township, New Jersey, and moved there in 1914, becoming the center of the Stelton Colony. Moreover, beyond New York City, the Ferrer Colony and Modern School was founded (c. 1910–1915) as a Modern School-based community, that endured some forty years. In 1933, James and Nellie Dick, who earlier had been principals of the Stelton Modern School, founded the Modern School in Lakewood, New Jersey.

== Late 20th century to present ==
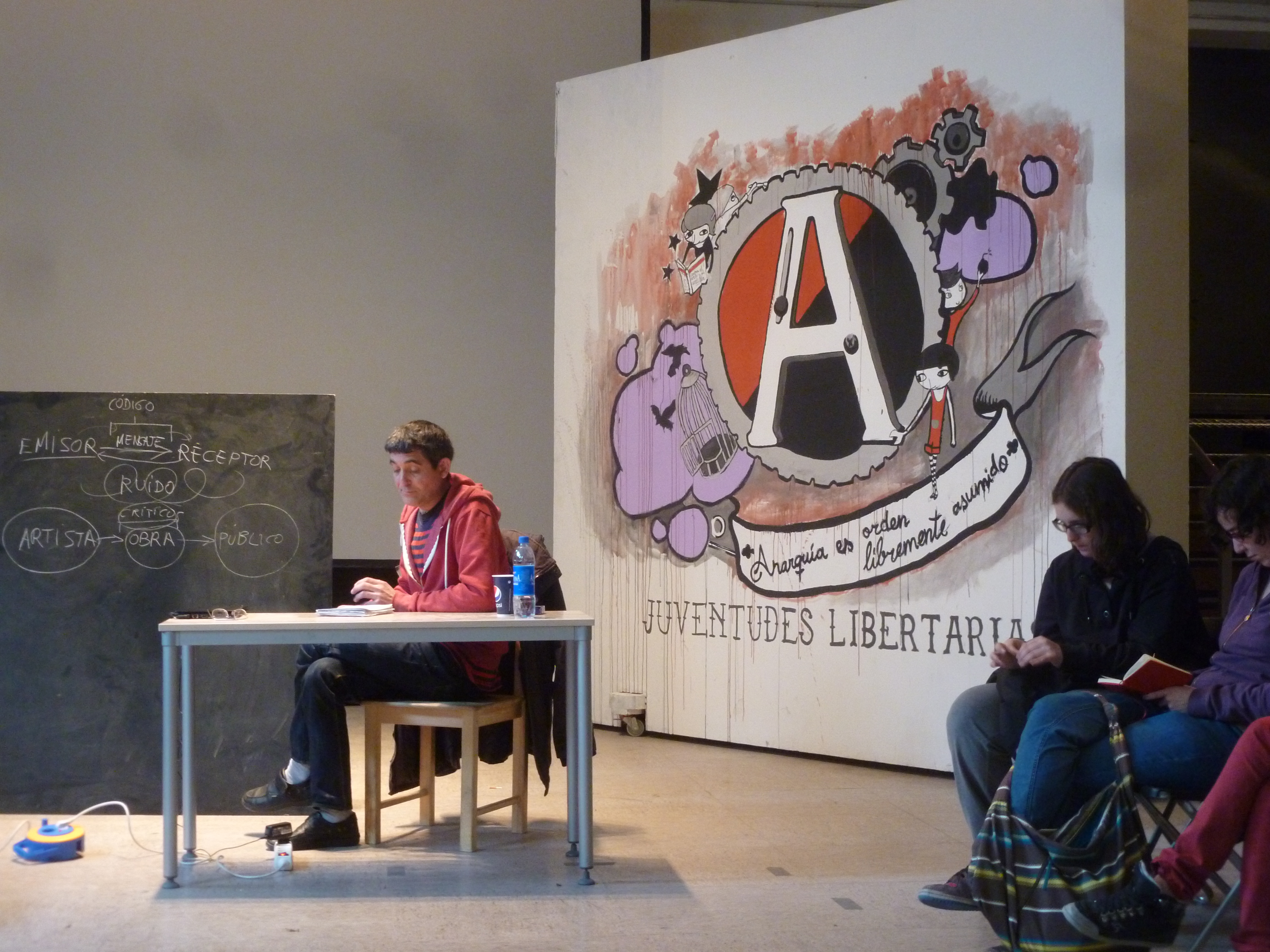
Class on anarchist art and aesthetics at Complutense University of Madrid

Experiments in Germany led to A. S. Neill founding what became Summerhill School in 1921. Summerhill is often cited as an example of anarchism in practice. British anarchists Stuart Christie and Albert Meltzer wrote that Neill pioneered of libertarian education and claimed him as an anarchist though he has denied this affiliation. However, although Summerhill and other free schools are radically libertarian, they differ in principle from those of Ferrer by not advocating an overtly political class struggle-approach.

The English anarchist philosopher, art critic and poet, Herbert Read developed a strong interest in the subject of education and particularly in art education. Read's anarchism was influenced by William Godwin, Peter Kropotkin and Max Stirner.

== See also ==
- Anarchistic free school
- Alternative education
- Colin Ward
- Democratic education
- Ivan Illich
- Mikhail Bakunin
- Paul Goodman
- Pedagogy of Leo Tolstoy
- Peter Kropotkin
- William Godwin

== Bibliography ==
- Archer, William (1911). The Life, Trial, and Death of Francisco Ferrer. London: Chapman and Paul. OCLC 912706772.
- Avrich, Paul (2006) [1980]. The Modern School Movement: Anarchism and Education in the United States. AK Press. ISBN 9781904859093. OCLC 818181069.
- Boyd, Carolyn P. (December 1976). "The Anarchists and education in Spain. (1868-1909)". The Journal of Modern History. 48 (4): 125–170. doi:10.1086/241533. ISSN 0022-2801. JSTOR 1877306. OCLC 5545665264. S2CID 144384298.
- Chappell, Robert H. (1978). "Anarchy Revisited: An Inquiry into the Public Education Dilemma". Journal of Libertarian Studies. 2 (4). Pergamon Press: 357–372. ISSN 0364-6408.
- Ferm, Elizabeth Byrne (1949). Freedom in Education. New York: Lear Publishers. OCLC 758754.
- Goodman, Paul (1964). Compulsory Mis-Education. New York: Vintage Books. OCLC 1058053482.
- Graubard, Allen (1972). Free the Children: Radical Reform and the Free School Movement. New York: Vintage Books. OCLC 1280933319.
- Hemmings, Ray (1973). Children's Freedom: A. S. Neill and the Evolutions of the Summerhill Idea. London: Allen & Unwin. ISBN 9780805234848. OCLC 925113195.
- Illich, Ivan (1971). Deschooling Society. New York: Harper & Row. ISBN 0-06-012139-4.
- Jandric, Petar (2011). "Wikipedia and education: anarchist perspectives and virtual practices" (PDF). Journal for Critical Education Policy Studies. 8 (2): 48–73. ISSN 1740-2743. Archived from the original (PDF) on 28 August 2011.
- Jensen, Derrick (2005). Walking on Water: Reading, Writing, and Revolution. Chelsea Green. ISBN 978-1-931498-78-4.
- Marshall, Peter H. (1993). Demanding the Impossible: A History of Anarchism. London: Fontana Press. ISBN 978-0-00-686245-1. OCLC 1042028128.
- Stirner, Max (April 1842). "The False Principle of Our Education". Rheinische Zeitung.
- Smith, Michael P. (1983). The Libertarians and Education. London: Allen & Unwin. ISBN 9780043701393. OCLC 9489121.
- Suissa, Judith (2001). "Anarchism, Utopias and Philosophy of Education". Journal of Philosophy of Education. 35 (4): 627–646. doi:10.1111/1467-9752.00249. ISSN 1467-9752. OCLC 5153554768.
- Suissa, Judith (2005). "Anarchy in the classroom". New Humanist. 120 (5). ISSN 0306-512X.
- Suissa, Judith (2010) [2006]. Anarchism and Education: a Philosophical Perspective. Oakland: PM Press. ISBN 978-1-60486-114-3. LCCN 2009912425. OCLC 671656004.
- Suissa, Judith (2018). "Anarchist Education". In Adams, Matthew S.; Levy, Carl (eds.). The Palgrave Handbook of Anarchism. London: Palgrave Macmillan. pp. 511–530. doi:10.1007/978-3-319-75620-2_29. ISBN 978-3319756196. S2CID 158605651.
