= Los Angeles Tribune =

Los Angeles Tribune may refer to any of these otherwise unrelated publications:

- Los Angeles Tribune (1886–1890), a newspaper published by Henry H. Boyce
- Los Angeles Tribune (1911–1918), a newspaper published by Edwin T. Earl
- Los Angeles Tribune (1941–1960), a newspaper published by Almena Lomax
- Los Angeles Tribune, a fictional daily newspaper in the TV series Lou Grant
