= Samuel Goldman =

Samuel Goldman may refer to:

- Sir Samuel Goldman (civil servant) (1912–2007), British civil servant and international banker
- Samuel Goldman (sculptor) (1882–1969), sculptor and anarchist
- Sam Goldman (1916–1978), American professional soccer player
