= Samuel Goldman (sculptor) =

American sculptor

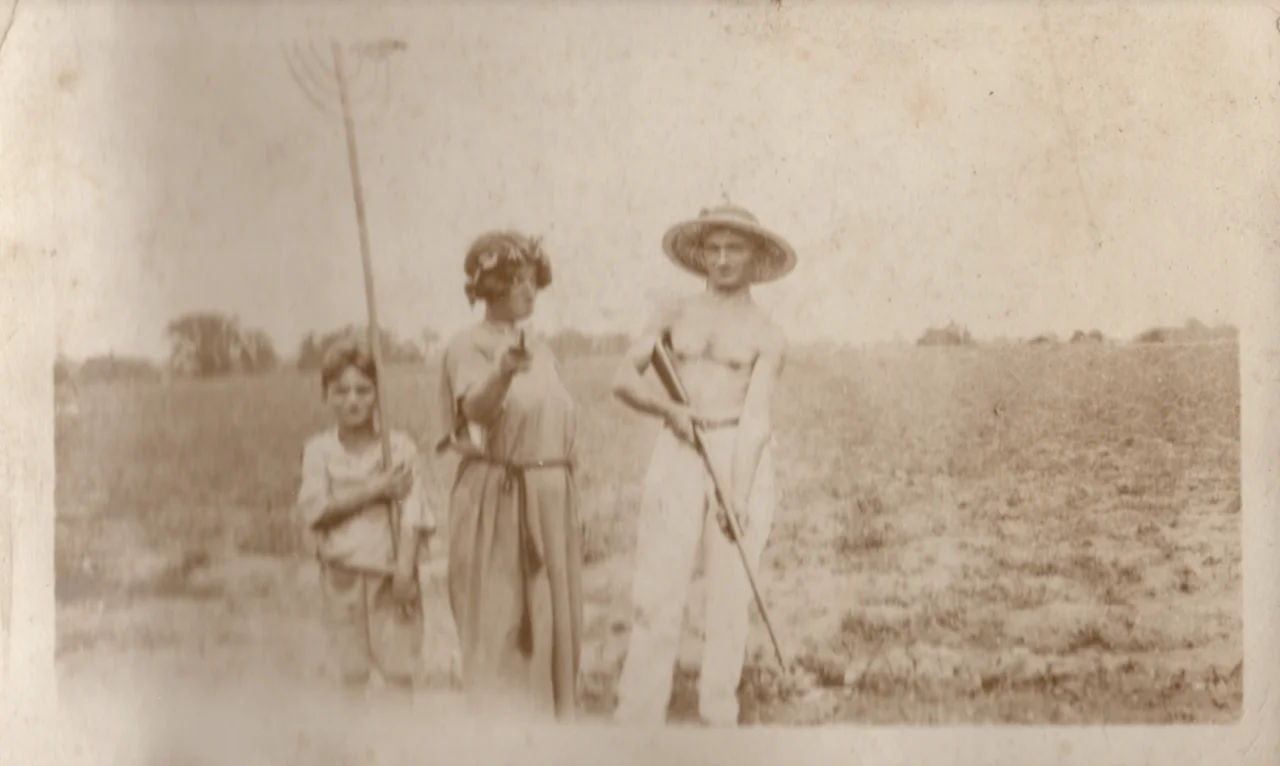
the Goldmans in the 1910s

Samuel Goldman (1882–1969) built a house on Fellowship Farms in Piscataway Township, New Jersey in 1915. In 1934, he organized the Anarchist Federation of America.

== Works ==
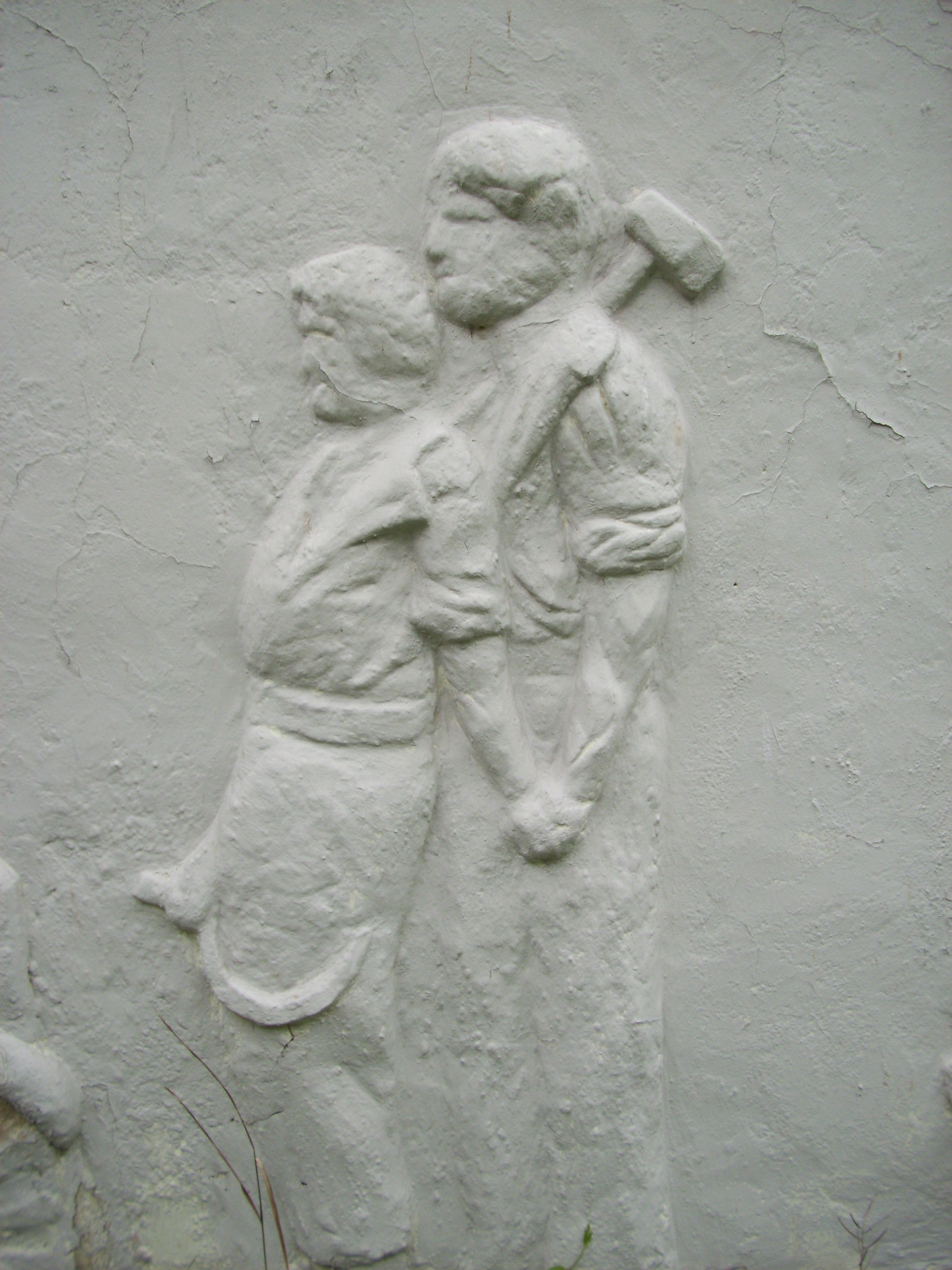
Stucco relief from Goldman family home

- Goldman House

== See also ==
- Ferrer Colony and Modern School
