= Gladstone, California =

Defunct settlement in California

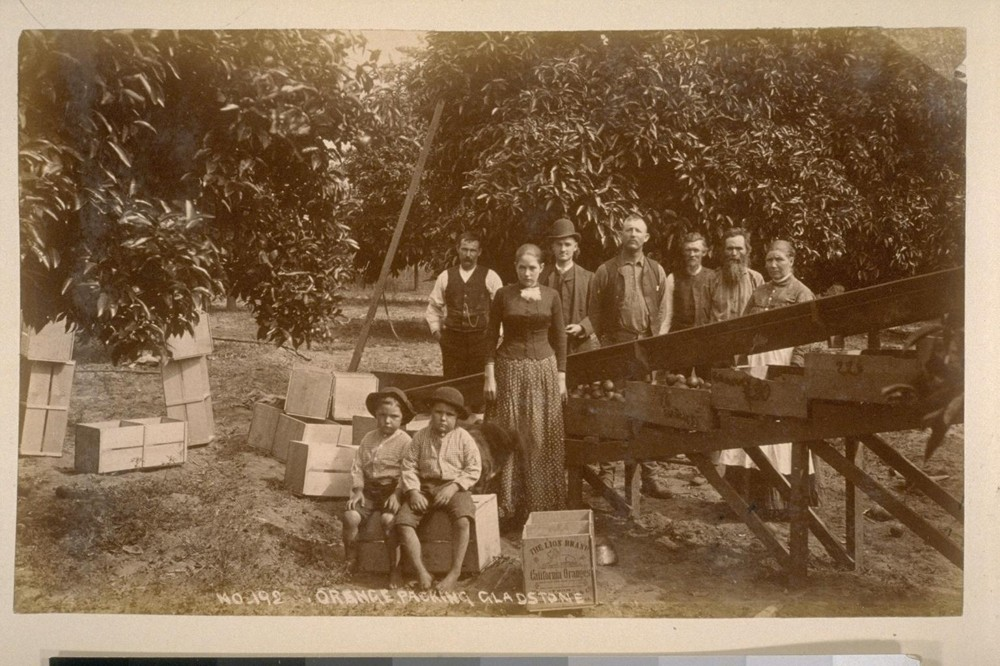
1887 photograph of orange packing in Gladstone, California

Gladstone was a settlement established during the Southern California real estate boom of the 1880s, located in the San Gabriel Valley in or near the present-day cities of Azusa, Covina, and Glendora in Los Angeles County, California. Named after the four-time Prime Minister of Britain, William Ewart Gladstone, it briefly flourished before rapidly declining following the collapse of the real estate market. Today, most of the former town of Gladstone has been incorporated into Azusa.

== History ==
Gladstone was established around 1884 as one of numerous speculative towns during a real estate boom that significantly reshaped Southern California in the late 19th century. Promoters marketed Gladstone as a lush paradise ideal for agriculture and residential settlement, describing it in advertisements as "525 acres of the most beautiful land the sun ever shone upon," complete with graded streets, two railway lines, and generous water infrastructure.

On April 23, 1887, Gladstone officially opened its land sales, showcasing early amenities such as a schoolhouse, church, general store, livery stable, and a small hotel colloquially known as the "Pull Tight Hotel." Advertisements promised ambitious projects, including a new grand hotel, ample electrical power supplied by a nearby waterfall, and inexpensive marble construction sourced from a local quarry. However, these lofty plans proved illusory—no waterfall was discovered, the marble quarry yielded only lime, and the grand hotel remained unbuilt. George Dexter Whitcomb, the founder of nearby Glendora, successfully used his connections in the railroad industry to lobby for the Atchison, Topeka and Santa Fe Railway (originally the Los Angeles and San Gabriel Valley Railroad) to run north of the South Hills, diverting the railway away from its originally planned route closer to Gladstone. This effort led to healthy economic and residential growth in Glendora, while it hurt Gladstone's prospects.

Despite initial enthusiasm that saw property values soar from approximately $300 per plot in 1885 to as high as $3,000 by 1887, Gladstone's prospects quickly unraveled following the collapse of the real estate bubble in 1888. Speculative frenzy gave way to rapid economic decline, with property values plummeting and numerous promised improvements left unfinished. The settlement's struggles were compounded by legal conflicts and negative press coverage, particularly driven by the personal rivalry between Gladstone co-founder Henry H. Boyce and Los Angeles Times publisher Harrison Gray Otis. Boyce had previously co-owned the Times, but after selling his stake to Otis in 1886, he founded the competing Los Angeles Tribune. While Boyce used his new paper to promote Gladstone, Otis used the Times to publish damaging reports on Gladstone's inflated claims and failures, further undermining public confidence.

Some structures from Gladstone survived until about 1903, after which they were relocated to nearby Azusa. In December 1905, the Gladstone Improvement Company officially ceased operations when it lost its corporate charter due to unpaid taxes.

== Legacy ==
Today, Gladstone's historical presence is preserved primarily through the name of Gladstone Street, a major east-west thoroughfare running from Irwindale to La Verne. The street remains as one of the few tangible remnants commemorating the former settlement.

== See also ==
- Alosta
- Southern California real estate boom of the 1880s
