= Henry Harrison Boyce =

American newspaper publisher and politician (1842–1903)

- Died: New York
- Occupations: Financier, publisher and politician
- Known for: the Los Angeles Tribune

Henry Harrison "H. H." Boyce (1842 – 14 October 1903) was an American financier, publisher and politician.

== Military service ==
Boyce enlisted in the U.S. Army as a private at age 20.

== Later life ==
In 1884, he became a shareholder in the Times-Mirror Company, which was later to publish the Los Angeles Times.

From 1886 to 1890, he was proprietor and manager of the Los Angeles Tribune, and was identified with the town of Gladstone, in this county of which he was the projector.

For over four years Boyce was the recognized leader of the Republican Party machine in Southern California. For four years he served as one of the directors of the Southern National Bank of California, and was interested In the development of Southern California during the boom period from 1885 to 1890. When the Tribune Publishing company failed, Boyce moved to Boston and secured control of the Advertiser of that city.

He died in New York City on 14 October 1903, at the age of 60, after being struck by a street car on Broadway crossing the road after dining at Delmonico's with his friend Benjamin F. Tracy. He received injuries from which he died in the hospital soon afterward.

His daughter Neith Boyce became an author and playwright.
