= Elizabeth and Alexis Ferm =

20th century libertarian educators

Elizabeth and Alexis Ferm were early 20th century libertarian educators best known for their work at the Ferrer Colony's Modern School.

== Early life ==
Elizabeth Battle (1857–1944) originally worked as a piano teacher. Her husband, Martin Battle, insisted on her submission, which she resisted. Once, after Martin locked her at home, she threatened him until he let her out, whereupon she separated from him. Upon finishing an education course in the 1890s, she ran a kindergarten in Brooklyn and met Alexis Ferm (1870–1971). The two married in 1898, following the death of her estranged husband. Alexis was a handyman a decade younger who both appreciated Elizabeth's educational work and shared the interest. He arranged his own work schedule to assist in her work as her disciple.

== Career ==
The Ferms believed that children should be protected from outside influence so as to cultivate their natural talents. Their program emphasized self-reliance and inoculation against hazard, such as experiencing the burn of a hot stove to understand its danger. Their schools emphasized creative activities, such as gardening, dancing, carpentry, and sports. Through founding their schools in New York, the Ferms came to meet Emma Goldman and her fellow anarchists of the area Ferrer Association. Goldman would write that the Ferms were the first Americans whose educational philosophy approximated hers, with children who were not externally compelled to study and instead were free to learn from experience and observation. She praised Elizabeth's understanding of child psychology.

In 1920, the Ferms became coprincipals of the Modern School in the Ferrer Colony of Stelton, New Jersey. The school was near the point of dissolution after five years of chaos, lack of discipline, frequent teacher turnover, and unruly living quarters. Elizabeth, who became known as "Aunty", was the more dominant of the two. They organized the new school building into four areas: crafts, manual training, kindergarten, and an academic library. Following disagreement with some parents, who wanted the school to put more emphasis on reading and class-struggle politics, the Ferms left the school in 1925 rather than compromise their technique. They would return in the next decade by request, as the school struggled through the Great Depression. Elizabeth died in 1944 and Alexis went into retirement four years later. The school closed in 1953 and Alexis died in 1971.

== Personal views ==
According to Emma Goldman, the Ferms were single-taxers who, "in reality ... were anarchists in their views and lives."

== Bibliography ==
- Gay, Kathlyn; Gay, Martin (1999). "Ferm, Alexis (1870–1971), and Elizabeth (1857–1944)". Encyclopedia of Political Anarchy. ABC-CLIO. pp. 74–75. ISBN 978-0-87436-982-3.
