= Alice Miriam Pinch =

American soprano

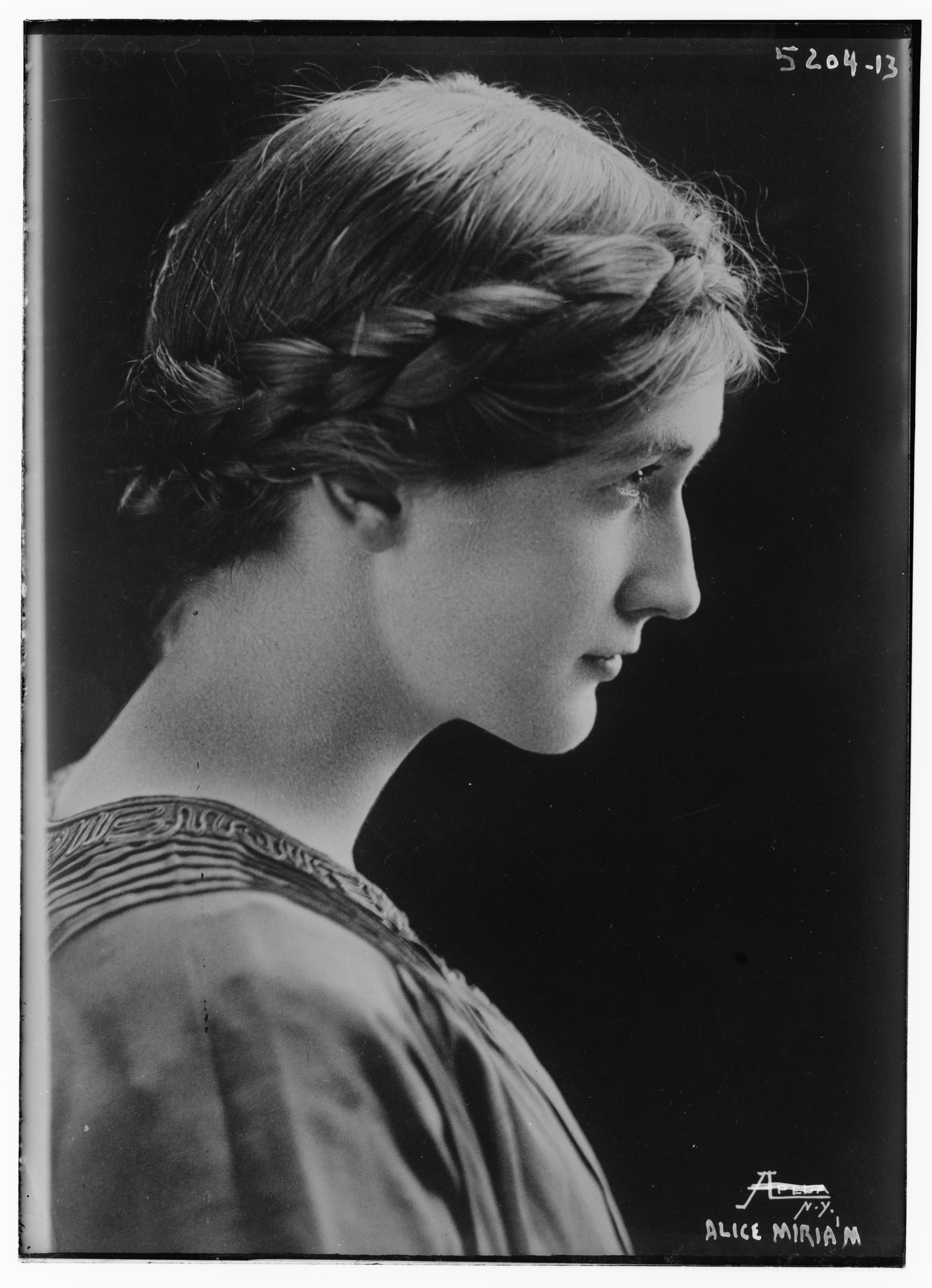
Alice Miriam

Alice Miriam Pinch (October 17, 1887 – July 22, 1922) was an American soprano who sang two seasons with the Metropolitan Opera Company of New York. Her career was cut short by her untimely death due to complications from appendicitis.

Prior to her engagement with the Metropolitan Opera, she accompanied Enrico Caruso on what proved to be his last tour of North America. Pinch went by the stage name Alice Miriam.

== Early life ==
Pinch was born in Newton, Kansas, on October 17, 1887. Her father, Rev. Pearse Pinch, was a Wesleyan Methodist Minister. Her mother, Mary Pinch, née McCasey, was born in New York City. Alice was the fifth of seven children. Her father immigrated from England at an early age. The family moved frequently during her childhood, remaining in the country's heartland until finally settling in Glendale, Maryland outside of Washington, D.C..

The young Pinch sang regularly in her church choir, singing solos by the age of eight. By age twelve she was earning extra money for her family by singing at funerals and other community and private events.

While living outside of the city of Chicago, she and her sister were engaged to perform at the Battle Creek Sanitarium. Pinch's performance caught the attention of a woman in the audience who provided her with a letter of introduction to the Chicago socialite Emily Hutchinson Crane, the widow of the industrialist Richard T. Crane. Thus Pinch became Crane's protégé, and it was arranged to send her to Europe for voice training. Crane covered all of Pinch's expenses for the next five years.

== The European Years ==
Pinch arrived in Paris in 1911 where she began her training for the opera, studying with Jean de Reszke. She remained in Paris until 1914.

While In Paris, she met the young German sculptor Arnold Rönnebeck, who was also there to study, and at the same time, establish himself within its modernist milieu. Rönnebeck's regular invitation to Gertrude Stein’s Saturday dinner parties are a testament to his success in this regard. The couple's social circle included Rönnebeck’s cousin, Karl von Freyburg, and the American painters Marsden Hartley and Charles Demuth. Pinch and Rönnebeck became engaged to marry during this period.

The onset of war meant Rönnebeck's return to Germany to enter military service. It was at this time that Pinch sought a new voice teacher, and relocated to Milan, Italy to train with Georges Cunelli. This change was a fortuitous one for both pupil and teacher. Cunelli was just setting out on what proved to be a storied career of fifty plus years. In his memoir he devotes a chapter to his work with Pinch, entitled My First Success.

Pinch began performing professionally across Europe before returning to the United States in 1919.

== Return Home ==
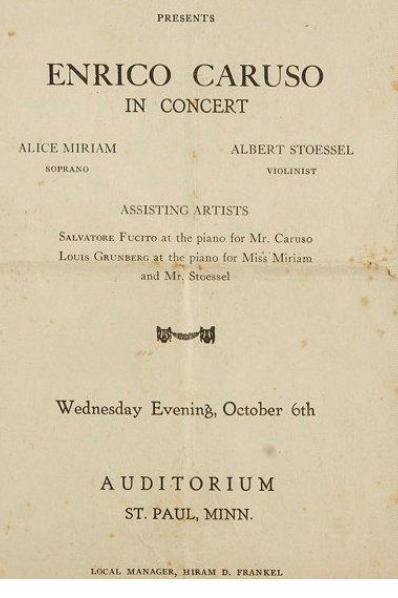
Enrico Caruso Program

Pinch sailed out of Genoa for New York City on September 4th, 1919. One year later, on September 28th, she embarked on an eleven city tour of North America accompanying Enrico Caruso.

Upon her return from the tour, Pinch began her first season with the Metropolitan Opera Company of New York. During her second season she received glowing notices when she was called on to fill in for the lead role in Nikolai Rimsky-Korsakov's The Snow Maiden (Snegurochka) when the principal performer Luctezia Bori fell ill the night before the performance.

In addition to her Opera dates, Pinch performed frequent recitals at private "soirées", as well as concert halls in and around the New York City area. Among the more notable was her appearance at The Town Hall when she and Allen Tanner premiered the entire song cycle Słopiewnie Op. 46 bis, composed by the Modernist Polish composer Karol Szymanowski on January 20 and 21, 1922.

Pinch's last performance with the Metropolitan Opera was at Municipal Auditorium (Atlanta) on April 29, 1922, when she performed the part of Siebel in Wagner's Faust.. Her contract had been renewed for three more years.

== Death ==
Pinch died at The Flower Hospital in New York City on July 22, 1922, after having undergone surgery for appendicitis the week before. Funeral services were held in Glendale, Maryland, on July 25.

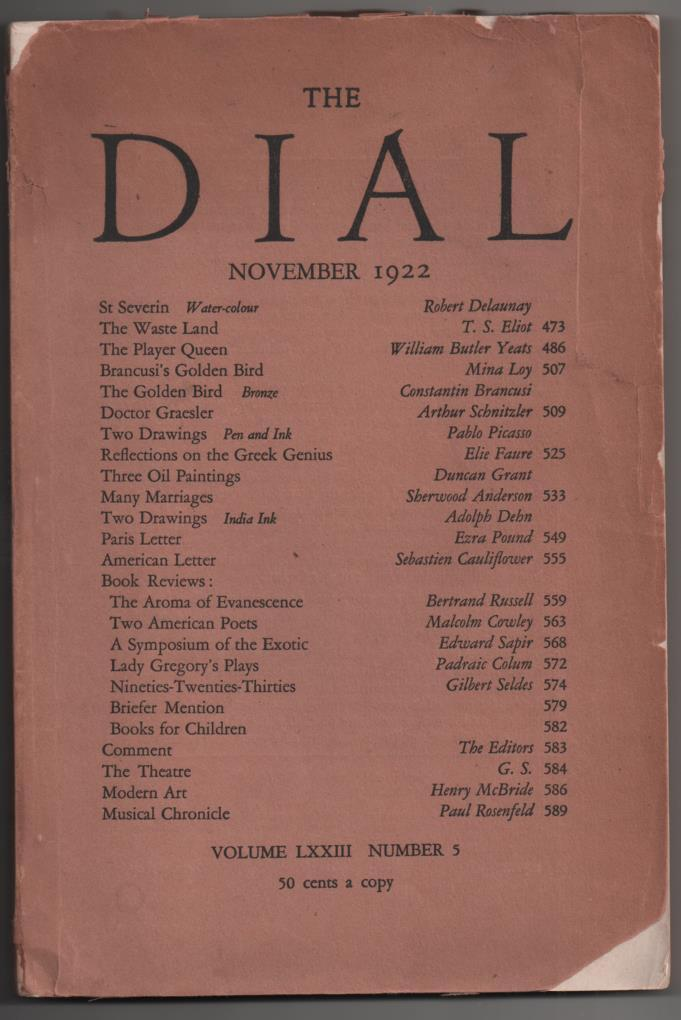
The Dial November 1922

Arnold Rönnebeck, after recovering from wounds suffered during the war, immigrated to the United States in 1923, and stayed with the Pinch family upon his arrival. Marsden Hartley dedicated his first published volume of poetry, Twenty-Five Poems "To Alice Miriam Pinch". Other appreciations of her work include the essay by Paul Rosenfeld, music critic for The Dial, published there in November 1922, and anthologized in his collection of essays, Musical Chronicle.
