= Nellie Dick =

Anarchist educator (1893–1995)

- Born: Naomi Ploschansky; 15 May 1893; Nr. Kyiv, Russian Empire
- Died: 31 October 1995 (aged 102); Oyster Bay, New York, US
- Occupation: Educator
- Movement: Anarchist; Modern School movement
- Spouse: James Hugh Dick (m. 1915; died 1965)

Nellie Dick (born Naomi Ploschansky; 15 May 1893 – 31 October 1995) was an anarchist educator and for 40 years was at the forefront of the Modern Schools movement. Alongside her husband, Jim Dick, she worked at the American Modern Schools in Stelton, Mohegan and Lakewood.

== Biography ==
Dick was born Naomi Ploschansky to a Jewish family near Kyiv on 15 May 1893, she was one of eight children. While an infant her family moved to Whitechapel in the East End of London, then Leeds, Glasgow, and finally Stepney Green in London. Her father was active in the Jewish trade union and anarchist movements and worked as a baker and a capmaker.

From 1907 until 1911 Dick organised a Sunday school at the Jubilee Street Anarchist Club, and in 1912 opened the Ferrer Sunday School in Whitechapel. In 1913 on a May Day march she met Jim Dick, an educator who had started a Ferrer school in Liverpool, and he subsequently joined her school as a co-director of the Sunday school. They married in 1915 so he could avoid conscription and then moved to the United States in 1917. Her family moved to Russia after the revolution, with her sister Bertha later spending 15 years in a prison camp.

From 1917 until 1924 Nellie and Jim Dick both worked at the modern school in Stelton, New Jersey. From 1924 until 1928 Nellie and Jim Dick directed the Mohegan Modern School in Mohegan, New York. From 1928 until 1933 they were co-principals at Stelton. In 1933 they founded their own school in Lakewood, New Jersey, which they ran until it closed in 1958 – the last of the American Modern Schools to close.

She retired with Jim to Miami, Florida, with Jim dying in 1965. In her retirement she was active in the senior citizens movement. In 1990 Dick moved to Oyster Bay, New York where she died on the 31st of October 1995, aged 102.

== Bibliography ==
- Avrich, Paul (1980). The Modern School Movement: Anarchism and Education in the United States. Internet Archive. Princeton, N.J.: Princeton University Press. ISBN 978-0-691-04669-3.

== Interviews ==
- Avrich, Paul (1995). Anarchist Voices: An Oral History of Anarchism in America. Internet Archive. Princeton University Press. pp. 282–290. ISBN 978-0-691-03412-6.
- Halvorson, Christine (27 February 1993). "Nellie Dick". Tamiment Library and Robert F. Wagner Archive.
- Mintz, Jerry (1990). Nellie Dick and the Modern School Movement (VHS). Roslyn Heights, NY: Alternative Education Resource Organization. OCLC 77680760.
- Pether, John (October 1988). "Conversation with Nellie Dick". The Raven (6). Freedom Press: 155–166 – via Internet Archive.
- Whitehead, Andrew (6 January 1993). "Political Voices: Nellie Dick".
