= Louise Emerson Ronnebeck =

American artist (1901–1980)

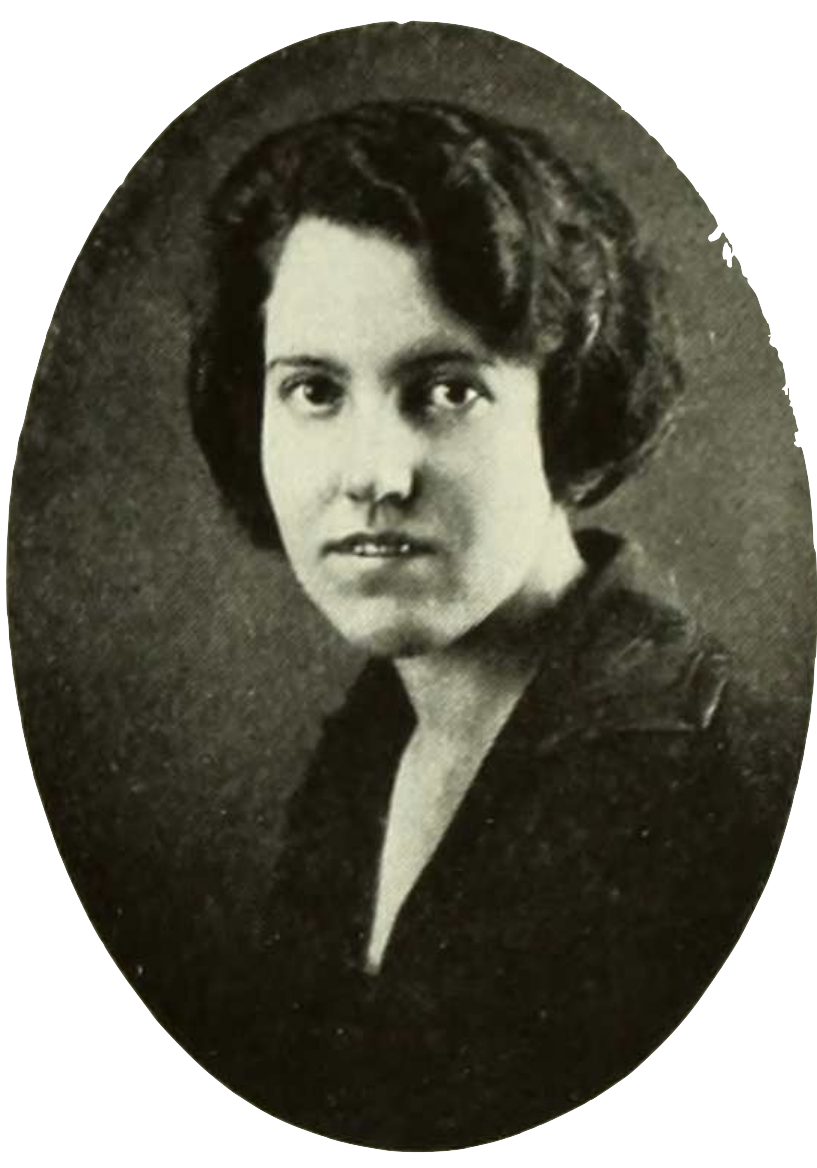
- Born: August 25, 1901; Philadelphia
- Died: February 17, 1980 (aged 78); Denver
- Alma mater: Art Students League of New York; Barnard College
- Occupation: Painter, muralist
- Employer: University of Denver
- Spouse(s): Arnold Rönnebeck
- Website: www.louiseronnebeck.com

Louise Emerson Ronnebeck (August 25, 1901 – February 17, 1980) was an American painter now best known for her work as a muralist. She won and completed two commissions for the Section of Painting and Sculpture. Her body of work included a significant number of commissioned frescoes as well as easel paintings, few of which are known to have survived.

Born in Philadelphia, Pennsylvania, Emerson grew up in New York. She married artist Arnold Ronnebeck (1885–1947) in 1926, and they settled in Denver, Colorado. In Denver and later in Bermuda, she worked as an artist and teacher. Her work in the 1930s and 1940s documented western American history and social issues.

== Early life ==
Mary Louise Harrington Emerson was born in 1901 in Philadelphia. Louise was the third daughter of Mary Crawford Suplee and Harrington Emerson (1853–1931). Her father was an efficiency engineer who established the Emerson Institute in New York City in 1900. Louise Emerson's great-grandfather, Samuel D. Ingham (on her mother's side), was Secretary of the Treasury under Andrew Jackson, the U.S.'s seventh President (1829–1837). Contrary to frequent publication, Louise Emerson was not the great-grand-niece of Ralph Waldo Emerson.

In 1922, Louise Emerson graduated from Barnard College. She went on to study at the Art Students League of New York for three years. One of her teachers at the League was Kenneth Hayes Miller (1876–1952). Miller formed the Fourteenth Street Group in New York and influenced American scene painting and the American social realist art movement. His students included Reginald Marsh, Edward Laning, and Isabel Bishop. Louise Emerson was particularly influenced by Miller's representational style and use of tempera.

In 1923 and 1924, Louise Emerson spent her summers at the Ecoles d'Art Américaines at Fontainebleau, France, studying fresco painting with Paul-Albert Baudouin.

== Married life ==
Arnold Rönnebeck and Louise Emerson met in 1925 when both were summer guests at Los Gallos, the Taos, New Mexico compound of Mabel Dodge Luhan. They were married on March 18, 1926 at the All Angels Episcopal Church in Manhattan. Mabel and Tony Luhan attended. Tony was dressed in formal Indian attire, i.e., ribbons braided into his waist-length hair, and he was wrapped in a formal blanket. Emerson had mixed emotions about Tony's attendance. Since Mabel and Tony were instrumental in Rönnebeck and Emerson's courtship, she wanted them to be present on this special day. On the other hand, according to family lore, she did comment, "When everyone filed into the church, no one paid any attention to the bride because there was this American Indian sitting there with the ceremonial ribbons in his braids".

Rönnebeck and Emerson subsequently set off on what they termed an "extended wedding trip" of the West that included stops in Omaha, Nebraska, Santa Fe, New Mexico, and Los Angeles, California. Arnold Rönnebeck executed commissions along the way. They finally settled in Denver, Colorado, where Arnold became director of the Denver Art Museum. The couple became founding members of the Denver Artists Guild, which held its inaugural exhibition in 1928. Louise Emerson continued to use her maiden name professionally until approximately 1931. After that time, she began to sign her paintings "Louise Emerson Ronnebeck" or "Louise Ronnebeck".

The couple had two children, Arnold, born in 1927, and Ursula, born in 1929. Emerson frequently painted scenes from daily life, including her children, their friends, and even their teachers as models. She also responded to local events that illustrated the lives of regional women, including painting a courtroom scene of a seventeen-year-old who murdered her husband when he divorced her. The people vs. Mary Elizabeth Smith shows Emerson's ability to tell a story visually.

== New Deal murals ==
During the Great Depression, Emerson actively sought commissions by submitting proposals through the Treasury Department's Section of Painting and Sculpture, later renamed the Section of Fine Arts. The Section focused on artwork for federal buildings. Some people believed that during these difficult times, there should be higher priorities than art. Harry Hopkins, head of the WPA appointed by FDR, said it best [of artists] "Hell! They've got to eat just like other people". Many feared that if the Depression continued for very long, a generation of artists would be lost and a fatal blow would be dealt to American culture.

Between 1937 and 1944, Emerson entered 16 competitions for mural commissions including the Department of Justice Building, Washington, D.C. (1936, 1941), Fort Scott, Kansas (1937), Phoenix, Arizona (1937), Worland, Wyoming (1938), Dallas, Texas (1940), Grand Junction and Littleton, Colorado (1940), Social Security Building, Washington, D.C., (1940 and 1942), Amarillo, Texas (1941), and Los Angeles, California (1944). She won two commissions for post office murals, both funded by the Treasury Department Section of Painting and Sculpture.

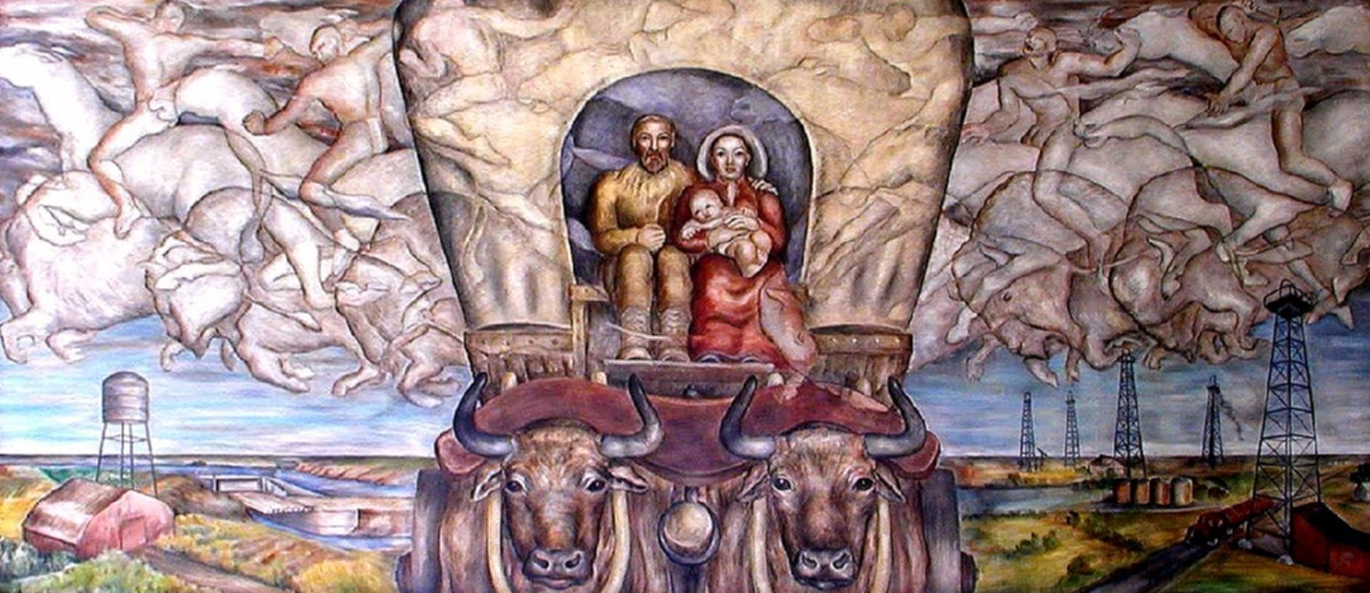
The Fertile Land Remembers, 1938, mural by Louise Emerson Ronnebeck

The first of Emerson's murals to be commissioned by the Section was The Fertile Land Remembers, 10 by 5 feet (3.0 m × 1.5 m) oil on canvas. It was designed for the post office in Worland, Wyoming and installed in 1938. There was some controversy over a Colorado artist being chosen to execute a Wyoming mural, but Edward Rowan, the Superintendent of the Section of Painting & Sculpture said in a memo to the Director of Procurement, "The artists of Wyoming had an equal chance with those in Colorado to compete in the regional competition. The artists of Wyoming according to all records are very poor".

In preparation for the project, Emerson researched Wyoming history and consulted with the Worland postmaster. The approved design depicted a determined-looking pioneer farming family in a Conestoga wagon pulled by oxen heading directly toward the viewer. In the background/sky are Indians riding horses chasing buffalo, executed in a translucent cloud-like manner. The Indians and the pioneer farming family were both historically dependent on the land and they are shown being displaced by the new, thriving and growing oil industry. The mural has since been moved and installed in the downtown Casper, Wyoming Post Office in the Dick Cheney Federal Building.

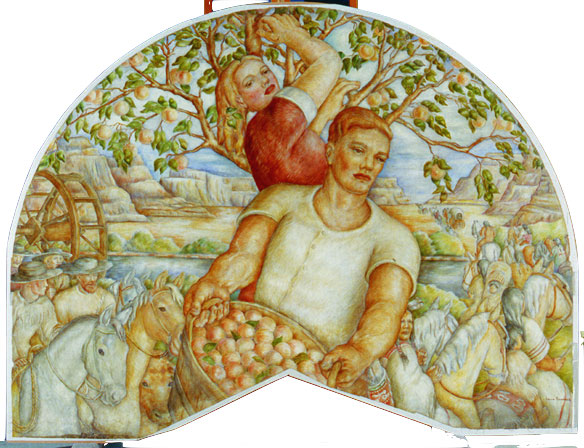
The Harvest, 1941, mural by Louise Emerson Ronnebeck

Emerson's second Section mural commission was designed for the post office in Grand Junction, Colorado. The Harvest (7'x 9' oil on crescent shaped canvas) was installed in the joint post office and courthouse in 1940. The Harvest depicts a young man and woman working together harvesting peaches, with a water wheel in the background, symbolizing "the richness that came to the land following the introduction of irrigation".

In Engendering Culture: Manhood and Womanhood in New Deal Public Art and Theatre, Barbara Melosh describes this frequently used Section theme as the "comradely ideal". She writes, "[Louise] Ronnebeck invokes the comradely ideal in the image of shared labor, and she emphasizes the physicality of work in the man's muscled arms and the woman's sturdy figure". Similar to her Wyoming mural, the man and the woman are equals, working towards a common goal. The mural depicts the Ute Indians leaving the valley on the right side, and the white settlers pushing them out from the left. The theme of displacement is effective and evocative of the time and the changes that had occurred and continued to occur in the West. Emerson's use of family, work, and local landscape reflects themes often found in American scene artworks of the 1930s.

The Harvest mural had a life of mystery. By 1973, the mural was dirty and dull. It was shipped to Washington DC for restoration and subsequently forgotten. Until 1991, its whereabouts were unknown. The building manager of the Aspinall Federal Building in Grand Junction had encountered frequent references to the mural but could not locate it. Through perseverance and dogged detective work, he finally located it in New York, had it restored, and returned it to Grand Junction. In January 1992, Emerson's son and daughter, who had modeled for the mural over 50 years earlier, unveiled it in a ceremony in Grand Junction's Wayne N. Aspinall Federal Building and Courthouse, where it remains today.

== Denver ==
Emerson worked in tempera and oil, but fresco was her preferred medium. Besides her Section murals, Emerson was commissioned to execute many murals and frescoes in the Denver area, for locations including, Kent School for Girls (1933), Morey Junior High School (1934) (still extant but in deplorable condition), the City and County Building (1935), the Church of the Holy Redeemer (1938), the Bamboo Lounge at the Cosmopolitan Hotel (1938) and the Robert W. Speer Memorial Hospital for Children (1940) (still extant, also in deplorable condition). Unfortunately, since frescoes are part of the architectural structure, many of them were lost when the buildings were torn down.

Her shortest-lived mural was entitled The Nativity, painted on canvas and installed on the pediment of the City and County Building. As planned, it was only up for the Christmas season of 1935. The mural was 76 feet long, and she completed it with the help of two assistants within two weeks after being asked to execute it. It was painted in sections in the basement of a Denver auditorium, and it took three days to install.

In 1942, the Denver Defense Council called for volunteers to work in areas for which they were best suited. Emerson volunteered to paint a mural for Denver's new USO Center and spent eight hours a day for three months painting a mural for the center. She pictured the peacetime pursuits of the then 26 United Nations countries that were then fighting the war. For this work, the Governor of Colorado named her civilian "Hero of the Week".

== Later years ==
Emerson joined the faculty at the University of Denver's School of Art & Art History in 1945, where she was an Assistant Professor of Drawing and Painting until 1950. Her husband, artist Arnold Rönnebeck, died on November 14, 1947. Her last public mural in Colorado was an abstract fresco for the lobby of Weld County Hospital in Greeley, Colorado in 1952.

In 1954, with both of her children married, Emerson moved to Bermuda and taught art at the Bermuda High School for Girls from 1955 to 1959. Her last mural was executed for St. Brendan's Hospital in 1966. Unfortunately, this mural was destroyed sometime in the 1980s when the hospital was renovated.

In 1973, Emerson left Bermuda and returned to Denver, where she remained until her death in 1980.
