= An Anarchist Woman =

1909 novel by Hutchins Hapgood

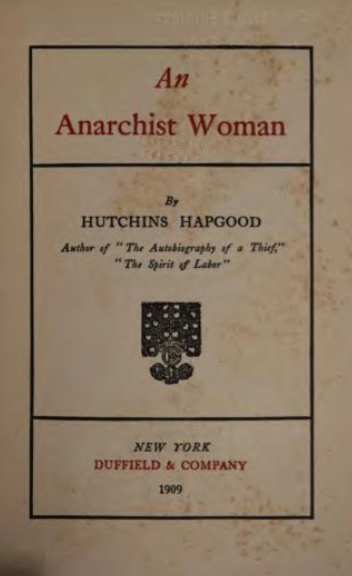
- Title page for An Anarchist Woman (1909)
- Author: Hutchins Hapgood
- Genre: Novel
- Publisher: Duffield & Co.
- Publication date: 1909
- Pages: 309

An Anarchist Woman is a 1909 novel by Hutchins Hapgood.

== Bibliography ==
- Colby, Frank Moore (August 1909). "Three Books of the Month (Rev. of An Anarchist Woman)". The Bookman. 29: 637–641.
- Eby, Clare Virginia (2014). Until Choice Do Us Part: Marriage Reform in the Progressive Era. University of Chicago Press. p. 216. ISBN 978-0-226-08597-5.
- Marsh, Margaret S. (1981). Anarchist Women, 1870–1920. Philadelphia: Temple University Press. pp. 22, 39, 188. ISBN 978-0-87722-202-6. OCLC 708544972.
- "Recent Fiction and the Critics (Rev. of An Anarchist Woman)". Current Literature. 47 (3): 339. September 1909.
- "Rev. of An Anarchist Woman". The Nation. 88 (2294): 608. June 17, 1909. hdl:2027/chi.78323923.
- Ross, Edward Alsworth (1910). "Review of An Anarchist Woman". American Journal of Sociology. 15 (4): 554–556. doi:10.1086/211808. ISSN 0002-9602. JSTOR 2762465.
- Stansell, Christine (1998). "Talking about Sex: Early-Twentieth-Century Radicals and Moral Confessions". In Halttunen, Karen; Perry, Lewis (eds.). Moral Problems in American Life: New Perspectives on Cultural History. Cornell University Press. pp. 283–308. ISBN 978-0-8014-8350-9.
- Mother Earth
