= Neith Boyce =

American novelist, playwright, and anarchist (1872–1951)

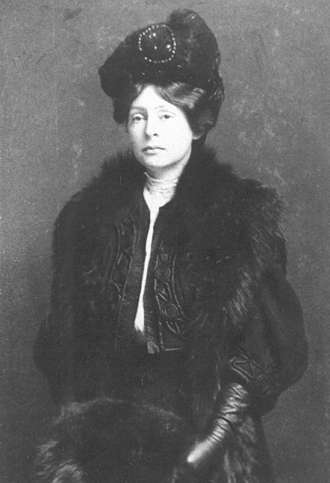
- Born: March 21, 1872; Franklin, Indiana, US
- Died: December 2, 1951 (aged 79); Richmond, New Hampshire, US
- Spouse: Hutchins Hapgood (m. 1899)
- Children: 2

Neith Boyce (March 21, 1872 – December 2, 1951) was an American script writer and theatre manager. Much of Boyce's earlier work was published with help from her parents, Mary and Henry Harrison Boyce. Neith Boyce later co-founded the Provincetown Players alongside Susan Glaspell, George Cram Cook, her own husband Hutchins Hapgood, and others. Boyce worked with the Provincetown Players in several capacities that included directing, performing, hosting productions in her home, and having all four of her plays produced. Boyce's plays featured plots that focused on women's sexuality, personal relationships, and agency.

== Early life ==
Neith Boyce was born in Franklin, Indiana, the second of five children to Henry Harrison Boyce and Mary Boyce. Henry Harrison Boyce had a wife and child before his relationship with Mary Boyce. This first marriage ended in a complicated divorce. In 1880, the diphtheria epidemic resulted in the death of all the Boyce children, except for Neith. The now family of three traveled from Milwaukee to Indiana and finally settled in Los Angeles.

Neith Boyce was self-educated in her family homes in California She did this by reading the books in her parents' library. She later attended a Los Angeles college that was overseen by an "old melancholy clerical gentleman." Like most women at the time, Boyce also received music lessons.

== Career ==
=== Early writing and journalism ===
Neith began publishing pieces as a teenager in the 1880s in the Los Angeles Times, which her father co-founded. By the mid-1880s the Boyces were leading citizens in Los Angeles. The family later moved to Boston in 1891, where Mary Boyce became an associate editor for The Cycle, which was a publication oriented towards women's rights issues. Mary Boyce helped publish a great deal of Neith Boyce's editorial work and poetry. The first of Neith Boyce's works to be published with the help of her mother was a segment titled "women's nature poetry." After her family moved to New York in 1896, Boyce began publishing articles and short stories successfully in Vogue magazine.

By the late 1890s, Neith Boyce was living in Greenwich Village with two other young women, who, like herself, were salaried newspaperwomen. The three made their way by writing for various New York City newspapers. Neith Boyce worked for Lincoln Steffens, then editor of The Commercial Advertiser. Boyce published her first book in 1896, The Chap-Book.

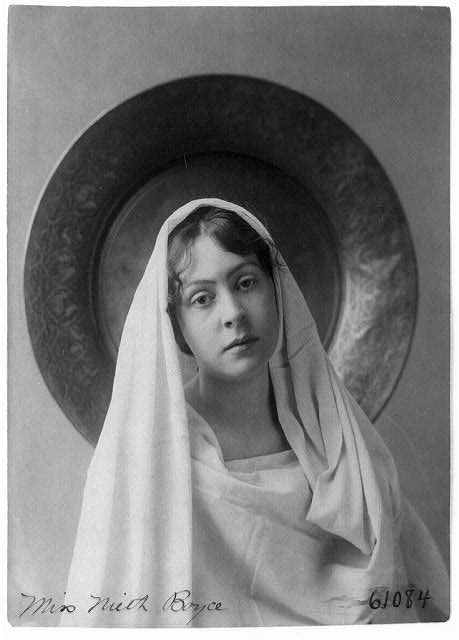
Neith Boyce c.1900

=== Playwright ===
Boyce's husband, Hapgood, took to spending summers in Provincetown, Massachusetts. Boyce became involved with the local community of female playwrights in Provincetown and was one of the founding members of the Provincetown Players. All four of Boyce's works for the stage were first presented by the Provincetown Players. Boyce also wrote, directed, and performed for the company.

Major themes that are consistent throughout Boyce's work include:

- Cases that argue for young men and women to experience periods of sexual or relational experimentation to avoid making serious mistakes.
- The power of social conventions, whether for good or evil.
- The negative effects on women's character from having to cope with life independently.
- The general difficulty of women's lives.

Boyce's Constancy (1914) inaugurated the first season of the theatre that would become the Provincetown Players. The play deals with the tempestuous relationship between two of her summer neighbors who were also members of the Provincetown Players, Mabel Dodge and John Reed. Boyce addresses sexual double standards through satirizing the love affair between Dodge and Jack Reed, both of whom were married at the time to other people. In the play, the male lead, Rex, cannot remain faithful to his lover, Moira, yet expects her to await his return from his latest love affair. This topic points to Boyce's frustration with the sexual double standard in her own marriage, as well as the hypocrisies practiced by the male members of the Provincetown Players.

The second production was of Enemies (1916) which was a collaboration between Neith Boyce and her husband. Enemies was written as a dialogue between a man and a woman that reflected the then contemporary war between the sexes. Neith Boyce wrote the woman's lines, and Hutchins Hapgood wrote the man's. The couple appeared in the play when it premiered in Provincetown. Enemies was one the first plays to be produced for radio.

Both Two Sons and Winter's Night were produced in 1916, however, a printed version of Winter's Night was not available until 1928. This published copy of Winter's Night featured several revisions from the script originally presented in Provincetown. Winter's Night features a female protagonist who rejects a proposal from her late husband's brother to start a dress-making business. This results in the suitor's suicide.

Boyce's last play, The Sea Lady, was based on the book by H.G. Wells. The play was in the works for a Broadway production when the novelist's agents pulled the rights. The script was then shelved and only discovered among the playwright's papers in recent years. It was given its stage premiere by the Metropolitan Playhouse in October 2022.

== Personal life ==
Neith Boyce met her husband, Hutchins Hapgood, while working for The Commercial Advertiser. Hapgood himself had a long career as a novelist and journalist. They married on June 22, 1899. They had four children.

The two would function as friends and advisors to such cultural celebrities as Mabel Dodge, Djuna Barnes, Alfred Stieglitz, Georgia O'Keeffe, and Gertrude Stein. Hapgood and Boyce had what was outwardly claimed to be a "modern marriage" in which both partners were equal, and neither was bound by sexual fidelity. However, behind closed doors, Boyce was solely responsible for the children, while Hapgood enjoyed numerous affairs. Hapgood's jealousy prevented Boyce from enjoying the sexual freedom that he enjoyed for himself. Her one exception to this restrictive marriage was Hapgood's support of her writing, and Boyce's ability to use her writing as a means to voice her own discontent and frustration.

Boyce died in 1951, aged 79.

== Bibliography ==
=== Novels ===
- The Chap-Book (1896)
- The Forerunner (1903)
- The Folly of Others (1906)
- Eternal Spring (1906)
- The Bond (1908)
- Proud Lady (1923)
- Harry: A Portrait (1923)

=== Plays ===
- Constancy (1914)
- Enemies (1916)
- Two Sons (1916)
- Winter's Night (1928)

== Sources ==
- Yale University Library - Guide to the Hapgood Family Papers
