= Fellowship Farm Cooperative Association =

Utopian anarchist community in New Jersey

Coordinates: 40°32′07″N 74°25′35″W

The Fellowship Farm Cooperative Association was a Utopian anarchist community in the Stelton section of Piscataway, New Jersey that was started in 1912.

== History ==
The farm was inaugurated on Thanksgiving Day in 1912. 263 acres (1.06 km^{2}) of active farmland was purchased by Ernest H. Liebel from J. C. Letson in Stelton and each member was leased 1-acre (4,000 m^{2}) of land. The project was supervised by G. E. Littlefield of Massachusetts. An advertisement was placed in the New York Call to attract people to the project. Samuel Goldman (1882-1969) began building the Goldman House in the Modern School colony in 1915. Also in 1915 members of the Ferrer movement bought adjacent land and started the Ferrer Colony and Modern School and they would eventually share a cooperative store.

== See also ==
- Ferrer Colony and Modern School
