= Goldman House =

Historic house in New Jersey, United States

- U.S. National Register of Historic Places
- New Jersey Register of Historic Places
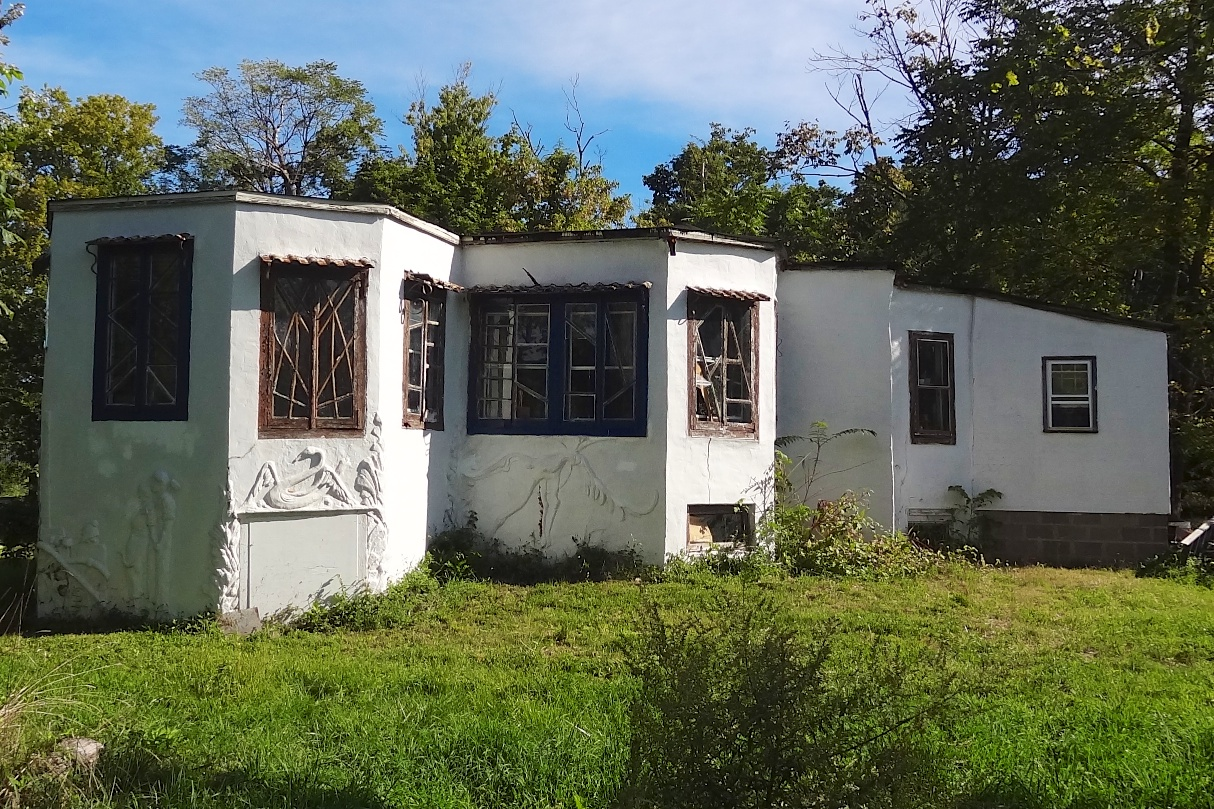
- Goldman House in 2013

- Location within Middlesex County, New Jersey Location within New Jersey Location within the United States
- Location: 143 School Street; Piscataway, New Jersey
- Coordinates: 40°31′47″N 74°26′04″W
- Built: 1915
- Built by: Sam Goldman
- NRHP reference No.: 10000813
- NJRHP No.: 4967

Significant dates
- Added to NRHP: October 1, 2010
- Designated NJRHP: April 28, 2010

The Goldman House is a historic building at 143 School Street in the North Stelton section of the township of Piscataway in Middlesex County, New Jersey, United States. Built in 1915 by Sam Goldman, it was part of the Ferrer Modern School Colony. The house was added to the National Register of Historic Places on October 1, 2010, for its significance in art and social history from 1915 to 1953. The structure and grounds are privately owned.

== History and description ==
After the 1914 Lexington Avenue explosion, 32 students and parents moved here in 1915 to start a new school and colony. Sam Goldman was born in 1883 in Russia and immigrated here around 1903. Sam and his wife Gusta continued work on the house until 1936. The one-story house has a stuccoed exterior and features bas-relief sculptures.

== Conservation challenges ==
The Goldman family sold the home in June 2024, unable to afford its upkeep. The new owners plan to demolish the home and build a new single-family house. Their realtor said the house was uninhabitable. A historical architecture firm said the house could be moved and preservationists started an online fundraising drive. If no organization wants the home, preservationists plan to take archival photos and a video of the property.

== See also ==
- National Register of Historic Places listings in Middlesex County, New Jersey
