= Edwin Dodge =

American architect

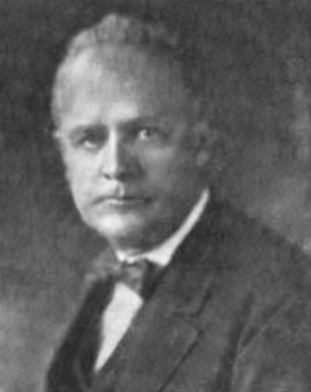
- Born: Edwin Sherrill Dodge; October 25, 1874; Newburyport, Massachusetts, US
- Died: December 10, 1938 (aged 64); Boston, Massachusetts, US
- Education: Harvard College; Massachusetts Institute of Technology; École nationale supérieure des Beaux-Arts
- Occupation: Architect
- Spouses: Mabel Dodge Luhan (m. 1904; div. 1916) Margaret Harrison Child (m. 1920)

Edwin Sherrill Dodge (October 25,1874 – December 10, 1938) was an American architect.

== Personal background ==
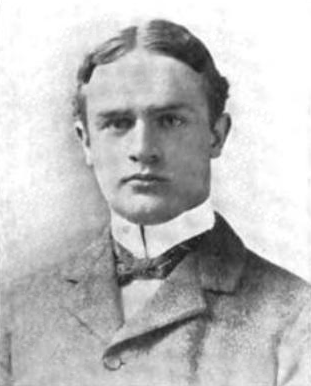
As a Harvard undergraduate, c. 1895

Dodge was born into a wealthy family of Newburyport, Massachusetts, the son of the manufacturer Elisha Perkins Dodge and Katherine Searles Gray Dodge. He earned an A.B. degree at Harvard College in 1895. He studied architecture at MIT, graduating in 1897. In 1902, he graduated from the École nationale supérieure des Beaux-Arts in Paris.

In November 1904, Dodge married art patron and writer Mabel Dodge Luhan, then known as Mabel Ganson Evans. Their unconventional marriage is described in her autobiographies Intimate Memories and European Experiences. The couple also appear in Gertrude Stein's The Autobiography of Alice B. Toklas.

In Arcetri, near Florence, they lived in the Villa Curonia and undertook extensive, expensive renovations that consumed their incomes for years; the house "drank money". They continued to live together, more or less, in Florence until 1911, when Dodge returned to the U.S. and established architectural offices in New York and Boston. After a long separation and scandal, their divorce was finalized in June 1916.

Dodge married Margaret Harrison Child in 1920, and remained married until his death in Boston on December 10, 1938.

== Professional background ==
In 1914, Dodge partnered with John Worthington Ames (1871–1954), who had trained at Harvard and at the École des Beaux-Arts. Together, they formed the architectural firm of Ames & Dodge.

Dodge's architectural designs include:

- Newburyport High School, Newburyport, Massachusetts, circa 1937
- Ellen T. Brown Memorial Chapel, Oak Hill Cemetery, Newburyport, Massachusetts, 1914
- Edwin Booth Memorial, with sculptor Edmond Thomas Quinn, Gramercy Park, New York City, 1918
- Hartford Fire Insurance Company Building, Asylum Hill, Hartford, Connecticut, 1921
- multiple buildings in the quadrangle at Smith College, as Ames, Dodge & Putnam, 1922–1936
- Cabot Hall at Cabot House, now part of Harvard University, Cambridge, Massachusetts, 1936
- Lotta Fountain, Charles River Esplanade, Boston, Massachusetts, with sculptor Katherine Lane Weems, 1939
- Bennington Commons and the 12 original student houses, Bennington College, Bennington, Vermont, 1931 - 1937
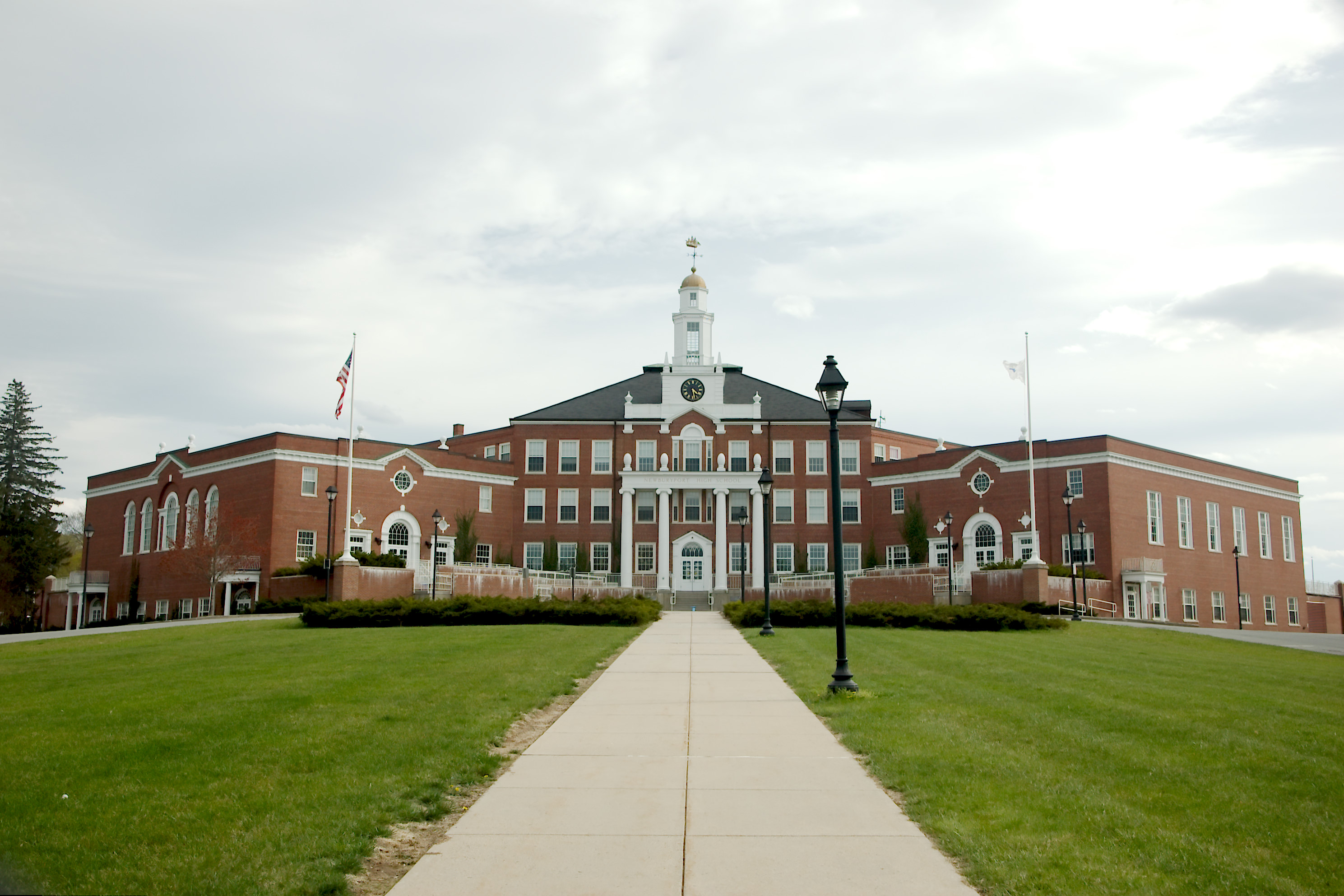
Newburyport High School (c. 1937), Newburyport, Massachusetts

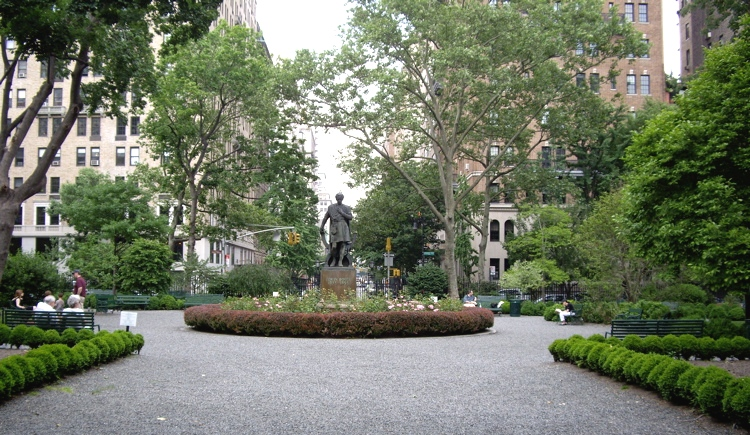
Edwin Booth Memorial (1918), Gramercy Park, New York City

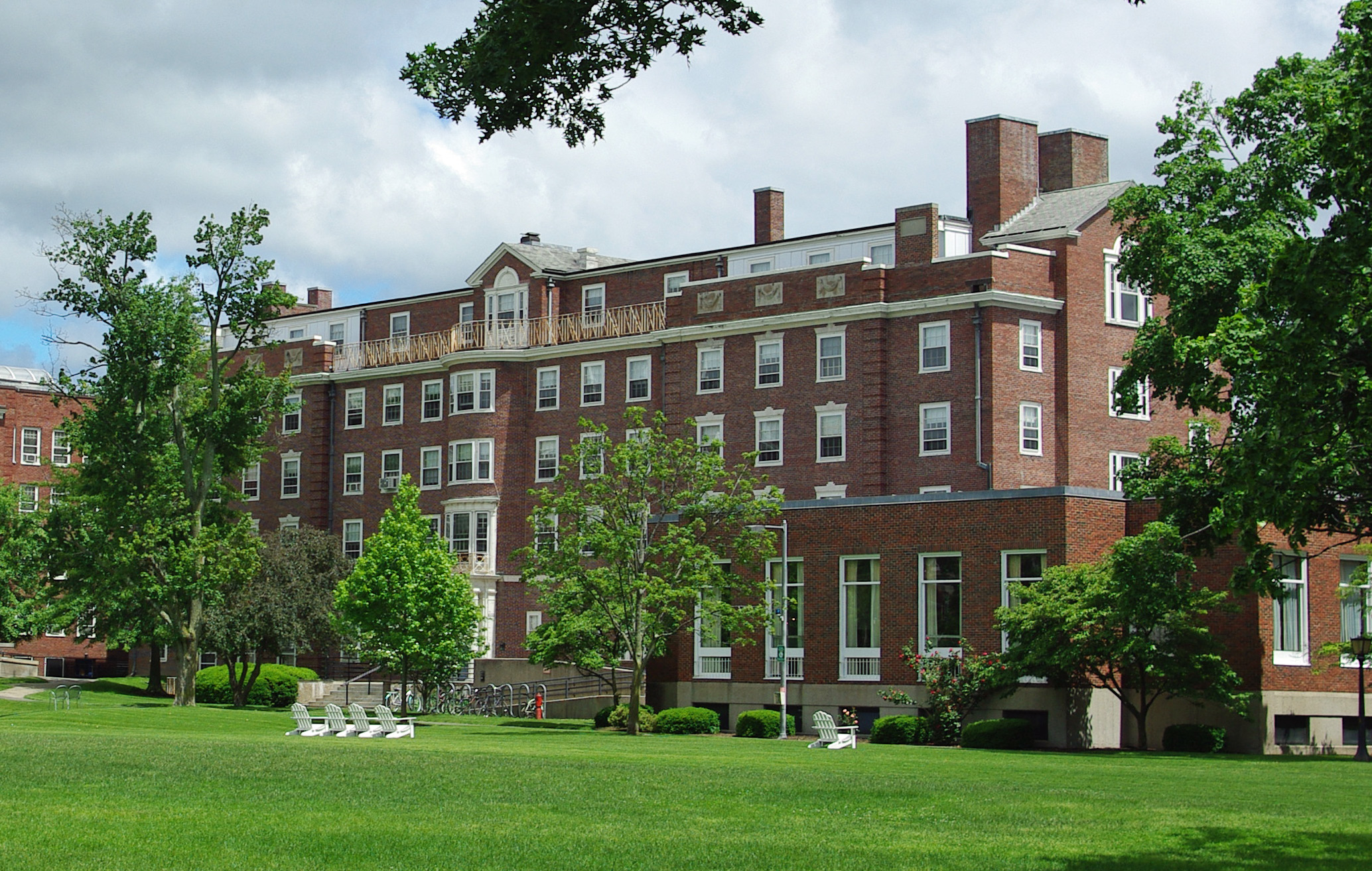
Cabot Hall (1936), Harvard University, Cambridge, Massachusetts

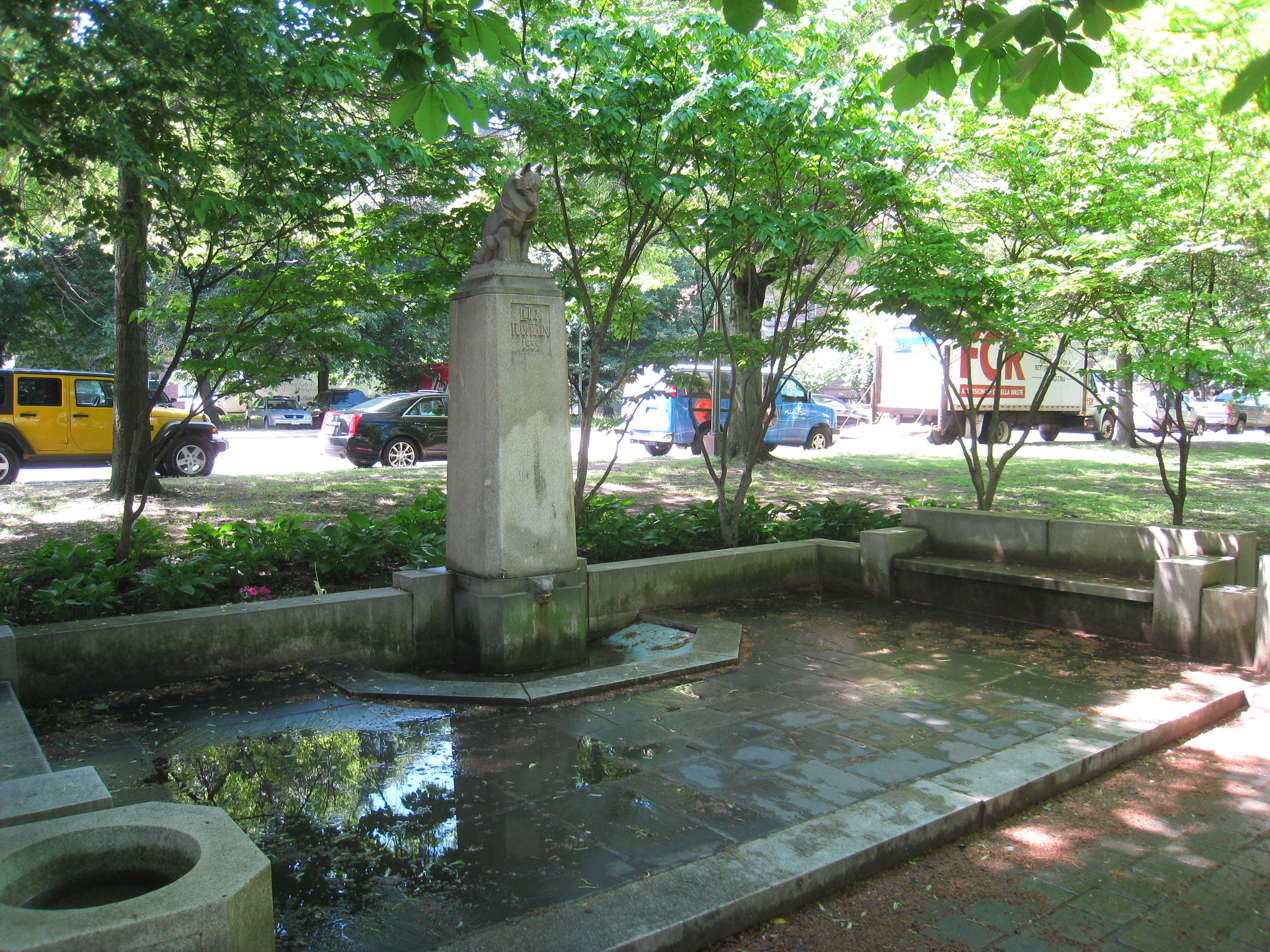
Lotta Fountain (1939), Boston, Massachusetts

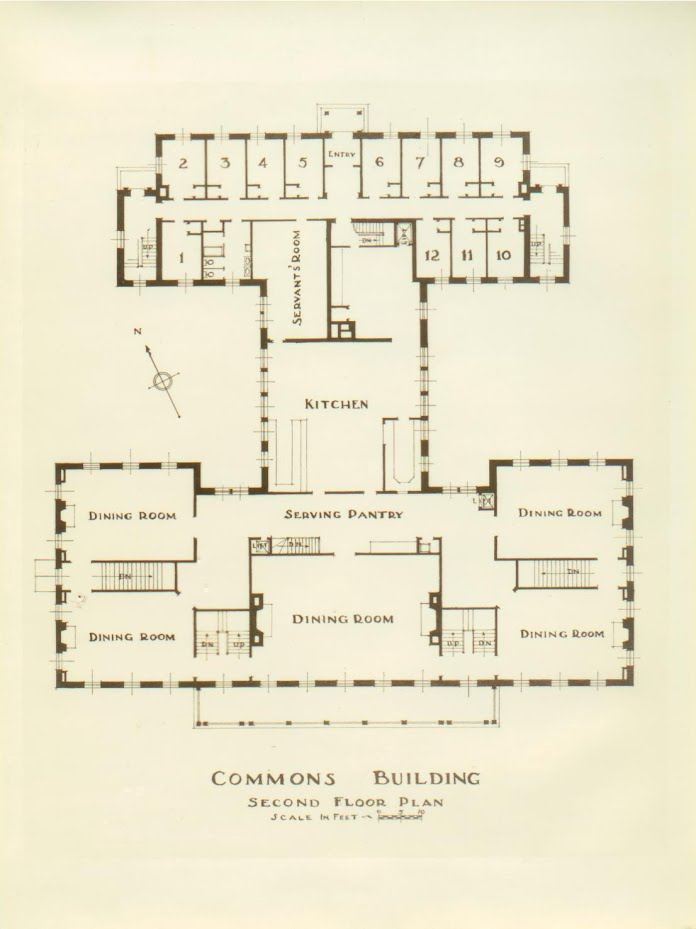
Commons Floor Plan Bennington College (1931 - 1937) Bennington, Vermont
