= Paterson pageant =

1913 reenactment of the ongoing Paterson silk strike

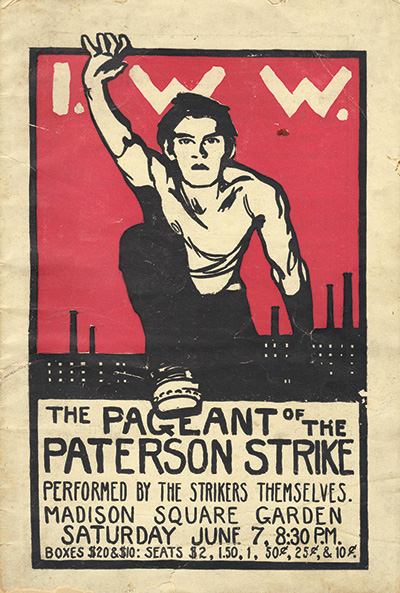
Poster for the pageant

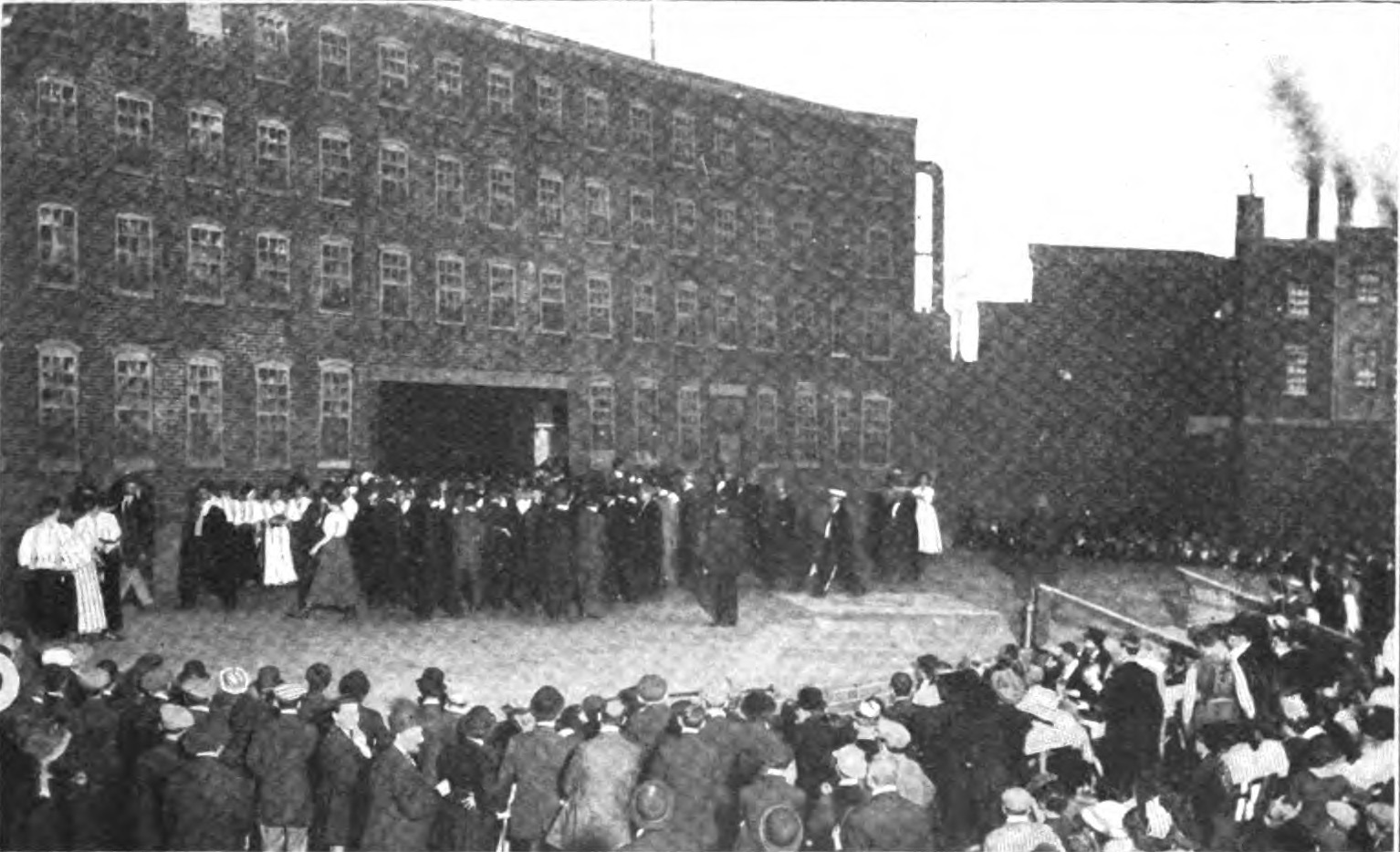
Photo of the pageant's second act

The Paterson pageant was a dramatic depiction of the 1913 Paterson silk strike acted by the strikers themselves in New York City's Madison Square Garden while the strike was ongoing. Staged by John Reed and other bohemians of Greenwich Village, the pageant played before a full audience and received positive reviews, though its public support and sympathy did not translate into success for the six-month strike, which crumbled following the pageant. One of the Wobbly leaders behind the strike, Elizabeth Gurley Flynn, credited the pageant with hastening strike's end, having split the strikers' attention from their primary cause.

The pageant attracted early career artists including Robert Edmond Jones, who designed the poster, and John Sloan, who painted the 90-foot mills backdrop.
