= Pedagogy of Leo Tolstoy =

Pedagogical views of Leo Tolstoy

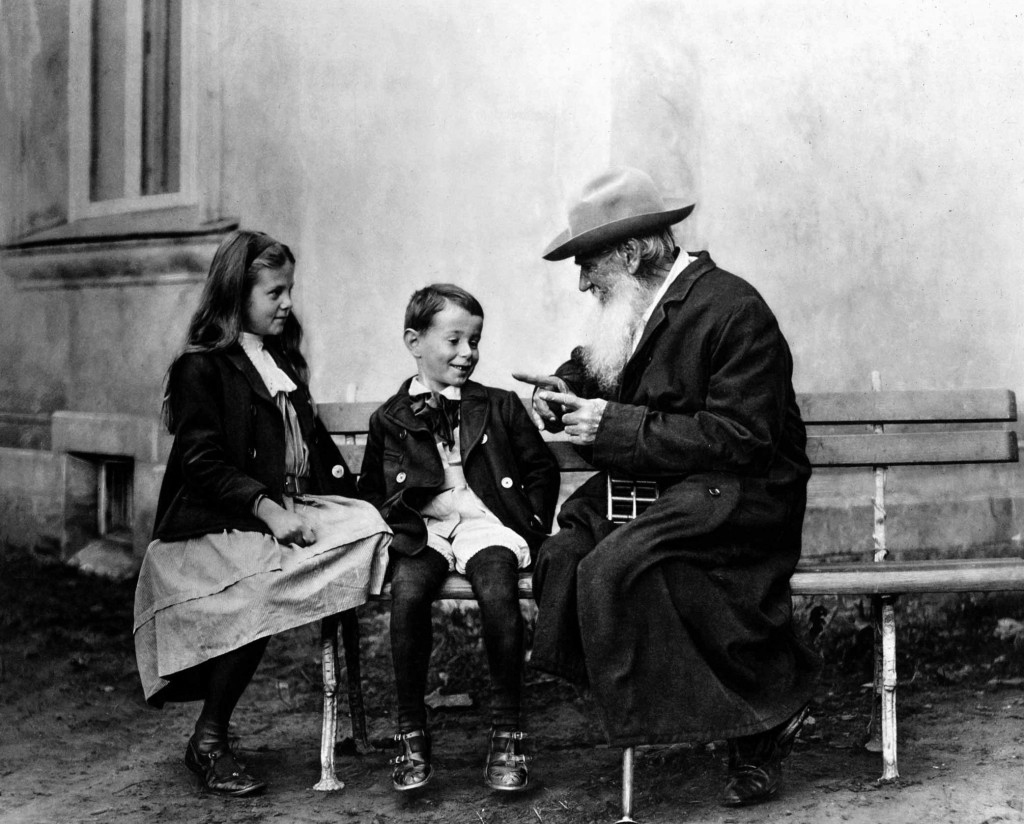
Leo Tolstoy with his grandchildren

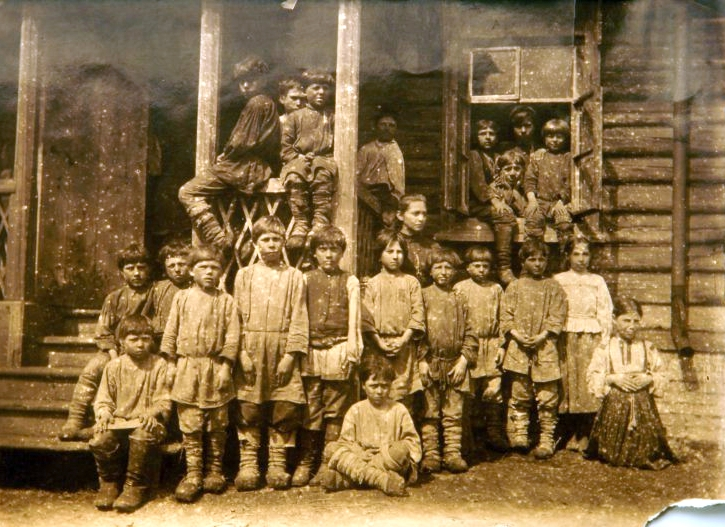
Children from Yasnaya Polyana

The pedagogy of Leo Tolstoy is a term that includes the contributions, pedagogical views and the educational philosophy of Leo Tolstoy. His ideas show influence from the educational philosophy of Jean-Jacques Rousseau, who also emphasized the natural goodness of children and the importance of freedom in learning.

== Overview ==
Leo Tolstoy, the renowned Russian writer, was not only a master of literature but also a profound thinker in education and teaching. The famous novelist had some distinct ideas about education, which he even tried putting into practice. His pedagogical ideas were deeply rooted in his belief in ethical and spiritual growth.

Tolstoy believed children are naturally curious and good, and education should focus on nurturing their inherent potential. He advocated for student-driven learning where the teacher acts as a guide, not a dictator. Tolstoy felt rigid curriculums and forced learning stifled a child's spirit. He emphasized freedom in education, allowing students to choose what interested them and learn at their own pace.

Tolstoy advocated for an educational system that nurtured not only intellectual growth but also the development of moral and spiritual values. He believed that education should encompass the whole person, fostering character, empathy, and compassion. In works like “Education and Culture” and “What Is Art?”, Tolstoy criticized formal education for its lack of emphasis on moral and spiritual aspects. He believed that true education should go beyond rote learning and engage with deeper questions about life and purpose.

Tolstoy's pedagogy emphasized freedom. He believed that students should have the autonomy to explore their interests and passions. His vision of education was not about imposing knowledge but about nurturing curiosity and self-discovery. Tolstoy's commitment to social justice extended to education. He advocated for equality in access to education, regardless of social status or wealth. His ideas influenced later educational reformers who championed inclusive and accessible schooling.

Tolstoy's literary works often carried implicit educational messages. Through characters and narratives, he conveyed profound insights about human nature, ethics, and the complexities of life. His novels, such as “War and Peace” and “Anna Karenina”, serve as both literary masterpieces and vehicles for moral reflection.

== See also ==
- Yasnaya Polyana
