= Ferrer Center and Colony =

American anarchist social center and colony

The Ferrer Center and Stelton Colony were an anarchist social center and colony, respectively, organized to honor the memory of anarchist pedagogue Francisco Ferrer and to build a school based on his model, Escuela Moderna, in the United States.

In the widespread outcry following Ferrer's execution in 1909 and the international movement that sprung in its wake, a group of New York anarchists convened as the Ferrer Association in 1910. Their headquarters, the Ferrer Center, hosted a variety of cultural events in the avant-garde arts and radical politics, including lectures, discussions, and performances. It was also home to the Ferrer Modern School, a libertarian day school that emphasized unplanned, undogmatic curriculum. The Center moved several times throughout Manhattan to establish a space conducive to children's play. Following a bomb plot and police infiltration, several anarchists from the association decided to take the school out to the country.

The school moved to what would become the Ferrer Colony in Stelton, New Jersey, 30 miles outside New York City, in 1914. The colony was based around the school and land was individually parceled such that, in the spirit of anarchist volunteerism, anyone could sell and exit the colony at their prerogative. They intended for the colony to form the center of a national libertarian education movement. The school floundered in its first years and passed through multiple administrations, the longest of which with co-principals Elizabeth and Alexis Ferm. The school closed in 1953. It had been a model for short-lived Ferrer schools across the country and lasted among the longest.

== Ferrer Center ==
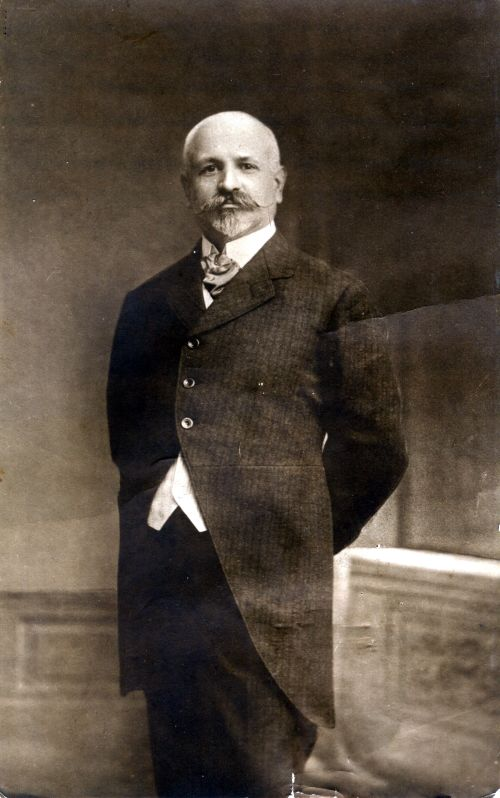
Francisco Ferrer, whom the project was named after

In 1909, the free-thinker, pedagogue, and anarchist Francisco Ferrer was executed in Barcelona and subsequently propelled into martyrdom. The resulting Ferrer movement led to the founding of anticlerical private schools in the model of his Escuela Moderna throughout the world. One such school was founded in New York.

On June 12, 1910, a group of 22 anarchists and sympathizers began the Francisco Ferrer Association in New York City. Together they built a "cultural center and evening school", which expanded into an "experimental day school" and, ultimately, a colony outside New Brunswick, New Jersey. The association lasted over 40 years and had three goals: to promote Ferrer's writings, to organize meetings on the anniversary of his death, and to establish schools by his model throughout the United States. Outside the United States, the Americans had no explicit connection with international Ferrer groups.

The Association's headquarters, the Ferrer Center, hosted a variety of cultural events: literary lectures, debates on current affairs, avant-garde arts and performance, social dances, and classes for the inquisitive masses. And when the Center crossed genres, its spirit of experimentalism was unpretentious. Though many of its teachers were hostile to formal academic manner, classes addressed standard subjects. Some were taught by distinguished individuals: painters Robert Henri and George Bellows taught figure drawing, Hjalmar Hjorth Boyesen's son taught comparative literature, Robert La Follette's law partner taught government, and Will Durant taught the history of philosophy. (Note: Among Henri's art students at the Center were Man Ray and, briefly, while in town, Leon Trotsky.) The Center held an evening English class, whose topics often included proletarian history and current affairs. One group studied Esperanto. Lectures discussed free thought, religion, sex, and hygiene. Margaret Sanger proposed mothers' meetings on birth control. On the weekends, the Center hosted speakers for discussion including journalist Hutchins Hapgood, poet Edwin Markham, and reporter Lincoln Steffens. A lecture by lawyer Clarence Darrow attracted hundreds. Others associated with the Center included Max Weber, Jack London, Upton Sinclair, and Elizabeth Gurley Flynn.

The folklorist Moritz Jagendorf started a "Free Theatre" at the Center in late 1914. The group performed new manuscripts, including a world premiere of a Lord Dunsany drama, as well as their own original plays, which had social themes. The theater had a very limited budget and some of its performers struggled to speak English. They also hosted Floyd Dell's troupe and others from Greenwich Village.

The Center had an air of radical affability and cosmopolitanism. Historian Laurence Veysey described the Center, with its unrestricted discussions on social subjects and wide representation of nationalities, as potentially the country's least inhibited and most stimulating small venue at the time. The Center's radical politics made it a haven for anti-capitalist revolutionaries, anarchists, and libertarians. It hosted children from the 1912 Lawrence textile strike, supported Frank Tannenbaum's 1914 mobilization of the unemployed, and fed protesters. The Center's formation coincided with a resurgence of interest in radical politics: the rise of syndicalism, multiple revolutions (including Russia), and strike actions. While assimilation had eroded immigrant interest in radical politics for several decades, with this optimistic turn, anarchism had begun to escape the stigma of the 1901 McKinley assassination. By 1914, the Center's adult membership was in the hundreds and Jewish people formed the largest contingent of its many represented nationalities. The social foundation of the New York Ferrer movement was the relationship between Jewish immigrants, who valued education, and domestic Americans, who approached teaching with alacrity.

The Association and Modern School leaders were mostly domestic Americans. Among the early leaders, only Joseph J. Cohen was an immigrant, and he arrived three years after the Center's founding. The rest were not immigrants: the early spokesperson and first Association president Leonard Abbott, Harry Kelly, and early financier Alden Freeman. Journalist Hutchins Hapgood, who lectured at the Center, came to write about Yiddish culture following his interactions there. Gallerist Carl Zigrosser wrote of the Center expanding his understanding of New York society beyond the knowledge he had received from books.

Several anarchists from the association decided to take the school out to the country.

The Center served as a model for schools across the United States in Chicago, Los Angeles, Salt Lake City, and Seattle. But while these schools mostly closed within several years, the schools in Stelton and Mohegan would last for decades.

=== New York Modern School ===
As was originally intended, the Ferrer Association established a day school for children within the Ferrer Center in October 1911. In practice, the New York Ferrer Modern School was based less on Ferrer's method than his memory. The New York school's founders were propelled by their sense of injustice at Ferrer's execution and their belief in the liberatory prospect of his approach, but they made no concerted effort to replicate his example. The American movement for progressive education was a more likely influence on the New York founders' interest in starting a school, as was the importance put upon education in Jewish culture. New York anarchists believed in the liberatory role of the school partly because, as European anarchist émigrés, they believed in the power of ideas to change the future and wanted their children to share their values.

The school's early character was unplanned and undogmatic. The Association sought "the reconstruction of society upon the basis of freedom and justice" and accordingly, the founders wanted their school to let children develop freely and through this freedom, develop a sense of social justice. The Association was essentially anarchist, unwedded to a particular ideal, but to the free expression of opinion and exchange of ideas. The school would be both a protected island against the influence of middle-class America, and a force to propel cultural and political revolution.

The Association found little agreement on school policy apart from that education was a process of educing a children's latent talents rather than a process of imposing dogma. The founders had little experience with education or parenting, apart from some having taught in the Workmen's Circle radical Sunday Schools, and trusting no authority, would hold long debates with no effect. Some Association members interfered in the classroom to the objection of other members. The day school teacher was not expected to uphold a religious or social dogma but instead to "have the libertarian spirit" and answer children's questions truthfully. The teachers had low salaries and high turnover, including multiple scrambles for staffing. No principal stayed longer than a year between 1911 and 1916.

The Ferrer Modern School also suffered its environmental conditions. The Center's original location at 6 St. Mark's Place was established in haste and could not house a day school for lack of outdoor play space and park access. It moved several blocks north to 104 East Twelfth Street just before the school opened for the school year in 1911. This location had an outdoor play space but the building continued to lack standard school equipment and was less accessible to radical families, so the school moved farther north in October 1912 to an older building in East Harlem, 63 East 107th Street, which had a stronger immigrant population and rested three blocks from Central Park. The three-story building included an unusable ground level floor, a large room on the second floor where two classes occurred at once, and a small office and kitchen on the third floor, where the adult anarchists congregated.

Enrollment rose despite the school's conditions. By 1914, the school taught 30 children and turned away half its applicants. Historian Laurence Veysey attributes this rise to the expressiveness and love shared between students and their teachers, and to a cultural "union of enthusiasms" in the Ferrer movement, in which new Jewish immigrants, whose families tended towards warm affection and interest in education, met a body of Americans who equally wanted to be their teachers. The day school's students were predominantly from immigrant, garment industry worker families with radical or anarchist politics. Like the Association itself, early principals of the day school were native born, largely with degrees from Ivy League schools and not Jewish. They were possibly propelled by their interest in upending the status quo, altruism for the poor, and a curiosity for bohemian life in the ghetto, as juxtaposed against their urban, predictable upper-middle class lives.

The school moved multiple times and ultimately closed in 1953.

Students would "often" not learn to read until ten or twelve years old.

== Stelton colony ==
=== Selection ===
Harry Kelly arranged the move to Stelton, New Jersey, about 30 miles from New York City. The anarchist printer and Association member selected the site, a farm within two miles of a railroad station. The group bought the land and resold plots to colonists at fair market value while setting aside land for the school. As anarchists, the colonists did not uphold a common doctrine towards property, and disagreed on whether private property should be preserved or abolished. Plots were individually owned such that, in the spirit of anarchist volunteerism, anyone could sell and exit the colony at their prerogative. ... They hoped the colony could form the center of a national libertarian education movement.

=== Stelton Modern School ===
The school at Stelton was founded in 1914. It floundered in its first years. In 1916, the socialist William Thurston Brown, who had experience operating modern schools, became Stelton's principal.

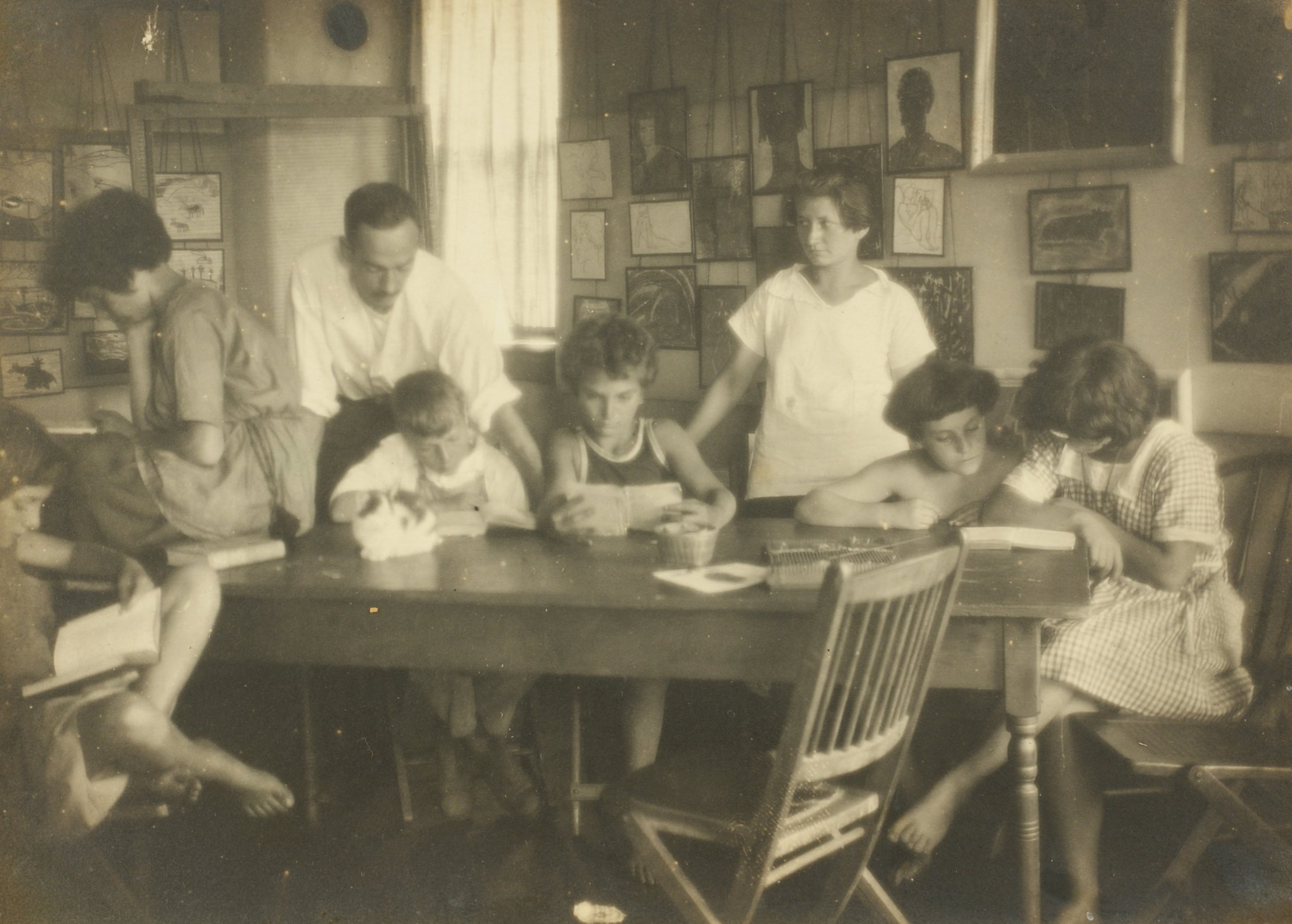
Reading lesson with Sherwood Trask in Stelton, ca. 1922

Stelton's lessons were non-compulsory and the school had no discipline or set curriculum, same as it was in New York City. Students joined in craft and outdoor activities. In addition to students from colonist families, between 30 and 40 children boarded at the school in what was formerly a farmhouse. Next to the farmhouse, Stelton built an open-air dormitory. Their winters were cold. Margaret Sanger's daughter died of pneumonia contracted in the boarding house.

Nellie and James Dick operated the boarding house for children, known as the Living House. The couple had formerly opened Ferrer schools in their original England and elsewhere in the United States. They promoted freedom and spontaneity in education. In their dorms, the Dicks taught personal responsibility.

In 1920, Elizabeth and Alexis Ferm became Stelton's co-principals. The couple had previously run schools in New York City. Their methods emphasized manual work and crafts—e.g., pottery, gardening, carpentry, dance—held in the schoolhouse's workshops. Alternatively, students could study in the library with James Dick. Following disagreement with some parents, who wanted the school to put more emphasis on reading and class-struggle politics, the Ferms left the school in 1925 rather than compromise their technique.

The school briefly floundered between 1925 and 1928, when the Dicks returned as co-principals. They renovated the dilapidated children's dormitories, resurrected the children-run periodical, and added a range of adult activities. The Dicks left in 1933 to pursue their longtime wish of opening their own Modern School in Lakewood, New Jersey.

The Ferms were recruited to return in the mid-1930s, when the school population declined as the Great Depression depleted family incomes. The American government established a military base adjacent to and with negative effects for the colony. Elizabeth Ferm died in 1944 and her husband retired four years later. The school had diminished to 15 pupils at the time. The school closed in 1953.

== Legacy ==
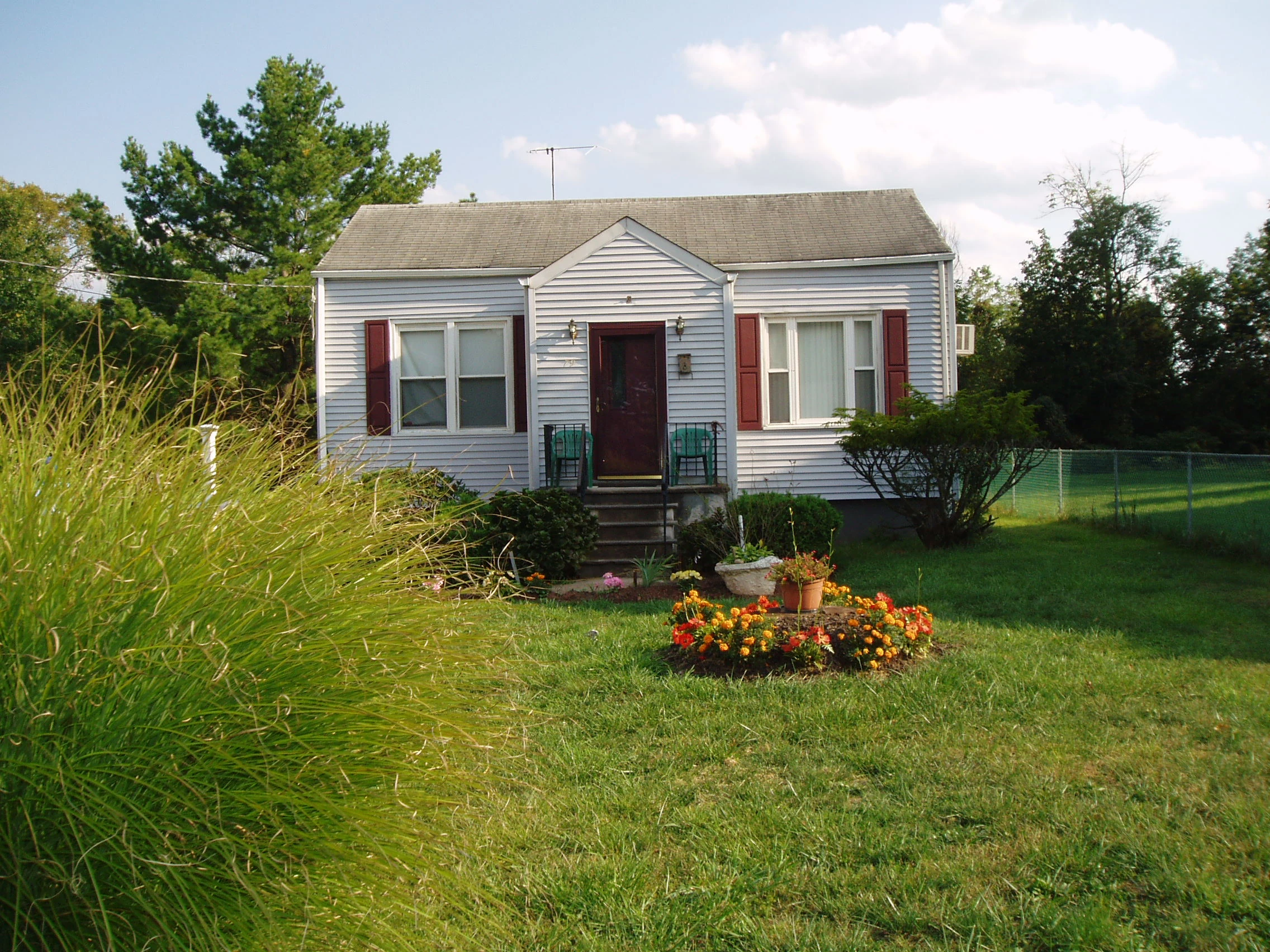
The former Kropotkin Library, 2013

Laurence Veysey described the association as "one of the most notable—though unremembered—attempts to create a counter-culture in America". Of its accomplishments, Veysey counted the association of (1) college-educated native Americans with recent, Jewish immigrants from eastern Europe, and of (2) intellectuals with laborers. Veysey called the Ferrer Modern School one of the few "truly advanced" American progressive schools of the 1920s. The Friends of the Modern School was founded in 1973. It was incorporated as a not-for-profit organization in around 2005 with the mission of preserving the legacy of the Stelton Modern School. Regular reunions of former students continued until the late 2010s and were recorded and are available at the Rutgers University archives. The records of the Friends, as well as the Modern School itself, can be found at Special Collections and University Archives, Rutgers.

== See also ==
- Fellowship Farm Cooperative Association
