= Los Angeles Tribune (1886–1890) =

Newspaper published from 1886 to 1890 by Henry H. Boyce

The Los Angeles Tribune was a newspaper published in Los Angeles, California in the 19th century.

It was published from 1886 to 1890 by Henry H. Boyce, once a partner with Los Angeles Times publisher Harrison Gray Otis. The two publications engaged in a "newspaper war", with both publishing stories that vilified the other.
