= Hutchins Hapgood =

American journalist and author (1869–1944)

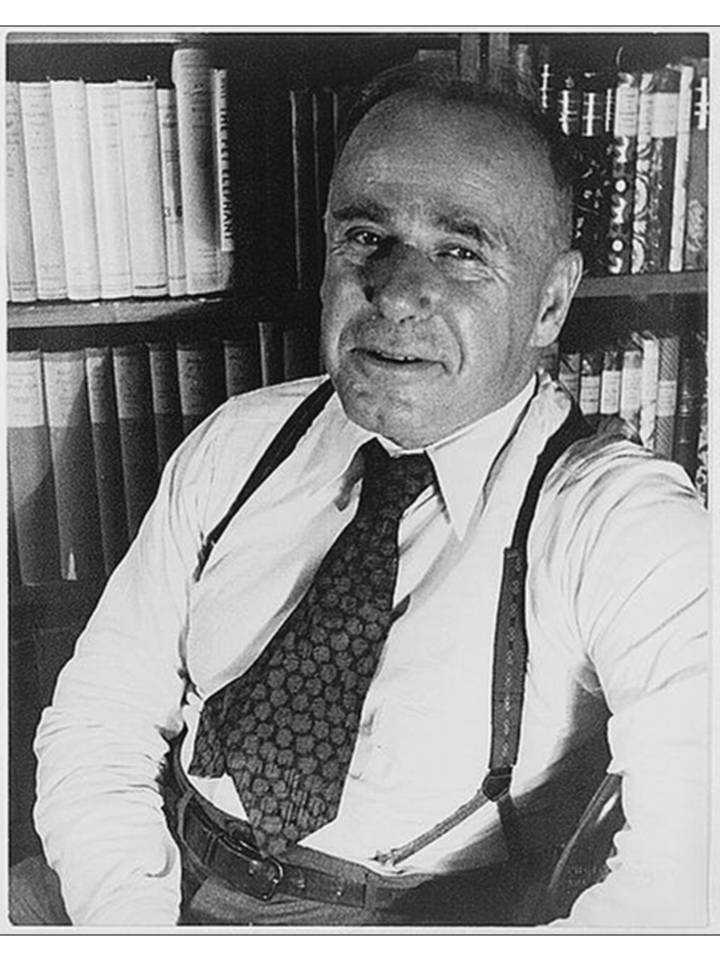
Hutchins Hapgood in 1933. Photograph by Carl Van Vechten

Hutchins Harry Hapgood (1869–1944) was an American journalist, author, and anarchist.

== Life and career ==
Hapgood was born to Charles Hutchins Hapgood (1836–1917) and Fanny Louise (Powers) Hapgood (1846–1922) and grew up in Alton, Illinois, where his father was a wealthy manufacturer of farming equipment. He is the younger brother of the journalist and diplomat Norman Hapgood. After a year at the University of Michigan, he transferred to Harvard University, where he took a B.A. in 1892 and earned his master's degree in 1897. Two of the intervening years were spent studying sociology and philosophy at the universities of Berlin and Freiburg, Germany. At first, he became a teacher of English composition at Harvard and the University of Chicago, but was eventually inspired by his older brother, Norman to pursue a career in journalism.

He obtained his first employment with the New York Commercial Advertiser (later known as the New York Globe). His mentor there was Lincoln Steffens, the muckraking reporter. On June 22, 1899, he married Neith Boyce, Steffens' assistant and a journalist in her own right. They had four children, two boys and two girls. In 1904, when the Advertiser was revamped as the Globe, he went back to Chicago for a time and became the drama critic for the Chicago Evening Post. Returning to New York, he spent much of his career as an editorial writer for the New York Evening Post, the Press, and the Globe.

== Works ==
- Paul Jones (1901) OCLC 613148935
- The Spirit of the Ghetto: Studies of the Jewish Quarter in New York (1902, reissued by Belknap Press, 1983. ISBN 0-674-83266-3)
- The Autobiography of a Thief (1903)
- The Spirit of Labor (1907, reissued by the University of Illinois Press, 2004. ISBN 0-252-07187-5)
- Types from City Streets (1910, reissued by Garret Press, 1970. ISBN 0-512-00759-4)
- An Anarchist Woman (Novel, 1909)
- The Story of a Lover (1919, published anonymously)
- A Victorian in the Modern World (Autobiography, 1939, reissued by the University of Washington Press, 1972: ISBN 0-295-95183-4)
