= History of higher education in the United States =

Aspect of American higher education

The history of higher education in the United States begins in 1636 and continues to the present time. American higher education is known throughout the world for its dramatic expansion. It was also heavily influenced by British models in the colonial era, and German models in the 19th century. The American model includes private schools, mostly founded by religious denominations, as well as universities run by state governments, and a few military academies that are run by the national government.

== Colonial era ==
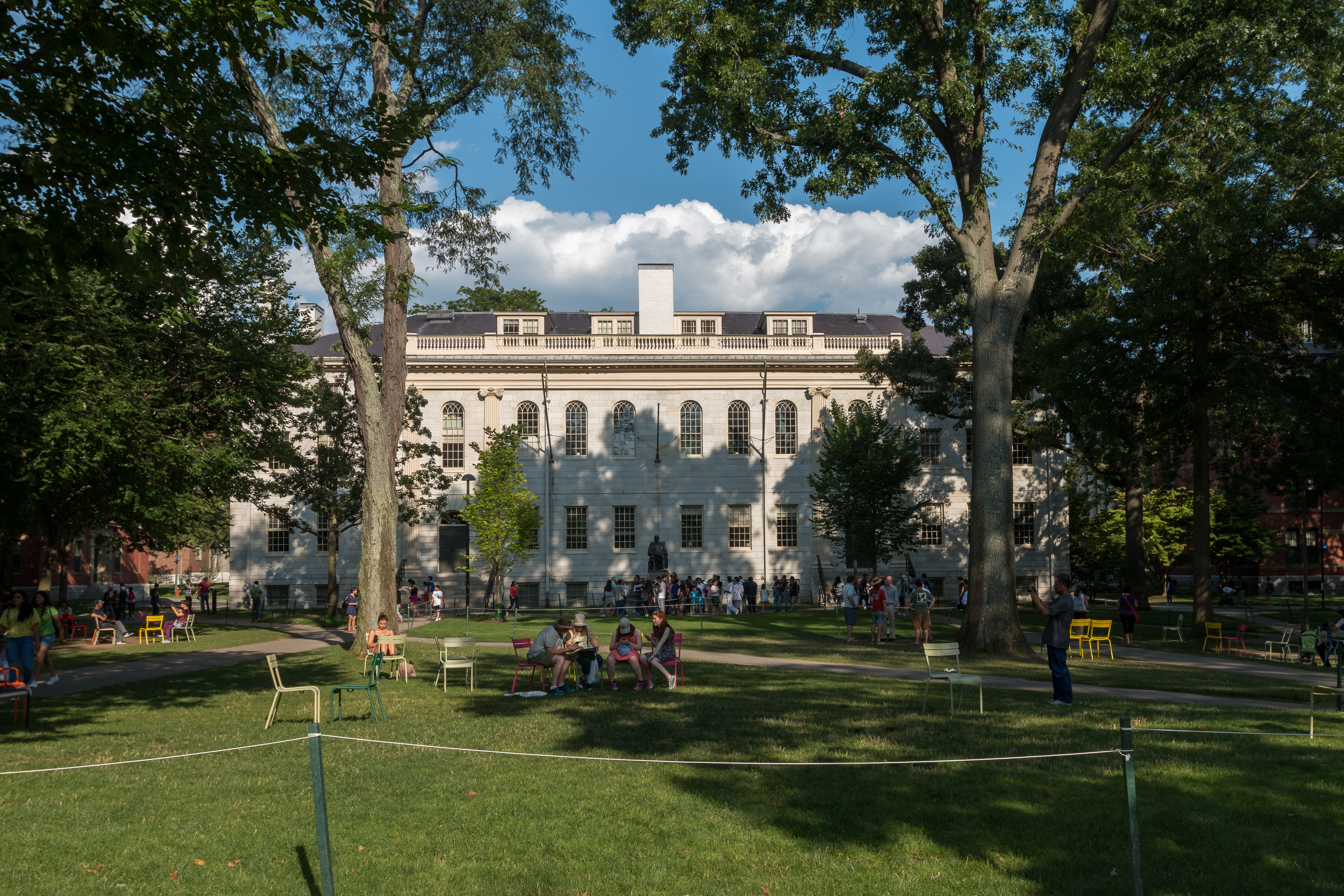
Harvard University, founded in 1636, is the oldest institution of higher education in the United States

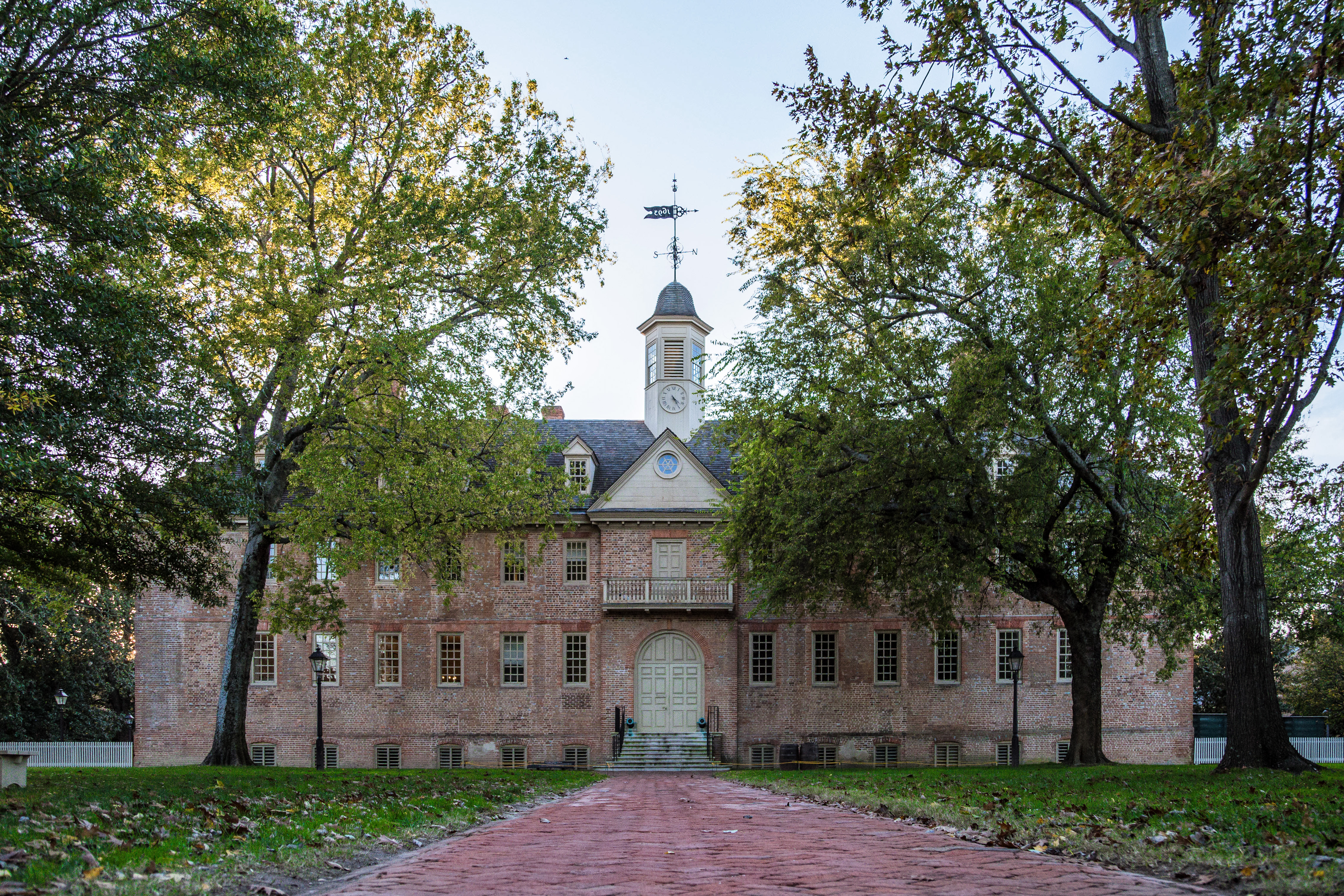
Wren Building at the College of William & Mary, built in 1700, is the oldest academic building in continuous use in the United States

Religious denominations established most early colleges in order to train ministers. They were modeled after Oxford and Cambridge universities in England, as well as Scottish universities. Harvard College was founded by the Massachusetts Bay colonial legislature in 1636, and was named after an early benefactor. Most of the funding came from the colony, but the colleges began to collect endowments early on. Harvard first focused on training young men for the ministry, and won general support from the Puritan government, some of whose leaders had attended either Oxford or Cambridge. The College of William & Mary was founded by the Virginia government in 1693, with 20,000 acres (81 km^{2}) of land for an endowment, and a penny tax on every pound of tobacco, together with an annual appropriation. James Blair, the leading Church of England minister in the colony, was president for 50 years, and the college won the broad support of the Virginia gentry. It trained many of the lawyers, politicians, and leading planters at the time. Yale College was founded in 1701, and in 1716 was relocated to New Haven, Connecticut. The conservative Puritan ministers of Connecticut had grown dissatisfied with the more liberal theology of Harvard and wanted their own school to train orthodox ministers.

New Light Presbyterians in 1747 set up the College of New Jersey, in the town of Princeton; it was later renamed Princeton University in 1896. In New York City, the Church of England set up King's College by royal charter in 1746, with its president Doctor Samuel Johnson the only teacher. Following the American Revolutionary War, the Tory administration of the college was overthrown and it was renamed Columbia College in 1784, then later renamed Columbia University in 1896. Rhode Island College was founded by Baptists in 1764, and in 1804 it was renamed Brown University in honor of a benefactor. Brown was especially liberal in welcoming young men from other denominations. The Academy of Pennsylvania, a secondary school, was founded in 1749 by Benjamin Franklin and other civic-minded leaders in Philadelphia. In 1755, it received its charter, was renamed College of Philadelphia and was converted into an institution of higher education. Unlike the other universities, it was not oriented towards the training of ministers. It was renamed the University of Pennsylvania in 1791. The Dutch Reformed Church in 1766 set up Queen's College in New Jersey, which later became Rutgers University. Dartmouth College, chartered in 1769, moved to its present site in Hanover, New Hampshire, in 1770.

=== Seeking a national university ===
Although European nations did not have a national university (England at the time enforced the duopoly of Oxford and Cambridge), many political and intellectual leaders called for one to unify the new nation intellectually, promote republicanism, enhance the status of learning, and keep up with European standards of scholarship. George Washington as president was the most prominent advocate along with Benjamin Rush, Thomas Jefferson, James Madison, Charles Pinckney, James Wilson, John Adams, John Quincy Adams, Alexander Hamilton, Joel Barlow, and James Monroe. Strong opposition came from the economy- and provincial-minded men who distrusted imposed uniformity in ideas. Anti-intellectualism, states-rights-ism, and indifference defeated the dream. However repeated efforts produced some smaller-scale operations: Columbian College in 1919 (now George Washington University) as well as national scientific centers including a National Observatory, the Smithsonian Institution, and in 1863, the National Academy of Sciences.

== Nineteenth century ==
Most Protestant, as well as Catholic, denominations opened small colleges in the nineteenth century, mostly after 1850. Nearly all taught in the English language, although there were a few German language seminaries and colleges.

=== Frontier ===
While colleges were springing up across the Northeast, there was little competition on the western frontier for Transylvania University, founded in Lexington, Kentucky in 1780. In addition to its undergraduate program, it boasted law and medical programs. It attracted politically ambitious young men from across the Southwest including 50 who became United States senators, 101 congressmen, 36 governors and 34 ambassadors, as well as Jefferson Davis, the president of the Confederacy. Many of the colleges started at this time were funded by churches and denominations, instructing pastors and teachers. It wasn't until the Morrill Land-Grant Acts of 1862 and 1890 that public colleges and universities were started in the Midwest, including many of the first public HBCU's

=== Curriculum ===
All the schools were small, with a limited undergraduate curriculum based on the liberal arts. Students were drilled in Greek, Latin, geometry, ancient history, logic, ethics and rhetoric, with few discussions and no lab sessions. Originality and creativity were not prized, but exact repetition was rewarded. The college president typically enforced strict discipline, and the upperclassman enjoyed hazing the freshman. Many students were younger than 17, and most of the colleges concurrently operated a preparatory school. There were no organized sports or Greek-letter fraternities, but literary societies were active. Tuition was very low and scholarships were few. Many of the students were sons of clergymen; most planned professional careers as ministers, lawyers or teachers.

By the 1820s there was a growing demand to replace Greek and Latin with modern languages, as had been proposed by Jeffersonians at the University of Virginia and the newly opened University of the City of New York. The Yale Report of 1828 was a defense of the Latin and Greek curriculum. It called to maintain traditions, especially against the forceful reputation of the German research universities that were starting to attract young American postgraduate scholars. Most critics viewed it as a reactionary move, although Pak Depicted in terms of attracting students from the growing number of private academies that continued to stress the classic languages. The reformers failed, and the classical languages continued as the centerpiece of the rigid traditional curriculum until after the Civil War. For example, at East Alabama Male College, a small Methodist school was founded in 1856 with a curriculum centered on Latin, Greek, and moral science; it resembled most other antebellum Southern colleges. It closed during the Civil War and reopened as the Agricultural and Mechanical College of Alabama, becoming the state's land-grant institution. While retaining some of the antebellum classical curriculum to accommodate the returning faculty, it added new courses in agricultural and industrial arts, as well as applied sciences. It became Alabama Polytechnic Institute in 1899, and is now known as Auburn University.

=== Impact of 19th-century colleges ===
The liberal arts colleges flourished and only a few added graduate programs. Summarizing the research of Burke and Hall, Katz concludes that in the 19th century:

1. The nation's many small colleges helped young men make the transition from rural farms to complex urban occupations.
2. These colleges especially promoted upward mobility by preparing ministers, and thereby provided towns across the country with a core of community leaders.
3. The more elite colleges became increasingly exclusive and contributed relatively little to upward social mobility. By concentrating on the offspring of wealthy families, ministers and a few others, the elite Eastern colleges, especially Harvard, played an important role in the formation of a Northeastern elite with great power.

=== Emergence of the modern university ===
Many American scholars and scientists studied at German universities before 1914. They returned with PhDs and built research-oriented universities based on the German model, such as Cornell, Johns Hopkins, Chicago and Stanford, and upgraded established schools like Harvard, Columbia and Wisconsin.

Historian Laurence Veysey in his book The Emergence of the American University (1965) explained how higher education was revolutionized after 1865 by the creation of the modern university. Stressing Johns Hopkins, Cornell, Clark, Harvard, Yale, Columbia, Michigan, Chicago, Stanford and Berkeley, Veysey showed how the newly created and newly reformed schools were influenced by German approaches that taught new findings based on experimental and empirical research techniques. The new model rejected the British model that reiterated over and over the Latin and Greek classics. The new university introduced new teaching methods such as lectures and seminars. It made graduate school training, culminating in the PhD, the mark of the true scholar. The doctoral dissertation required students to create new knowledge, preferably through experimental methods or research in original sources. The new land grant state universities generally followed the new model and deemphasized classical Latin and Greek while adding science, technology, industrial engineering and agricultural science.

=== Law and medical schools ===
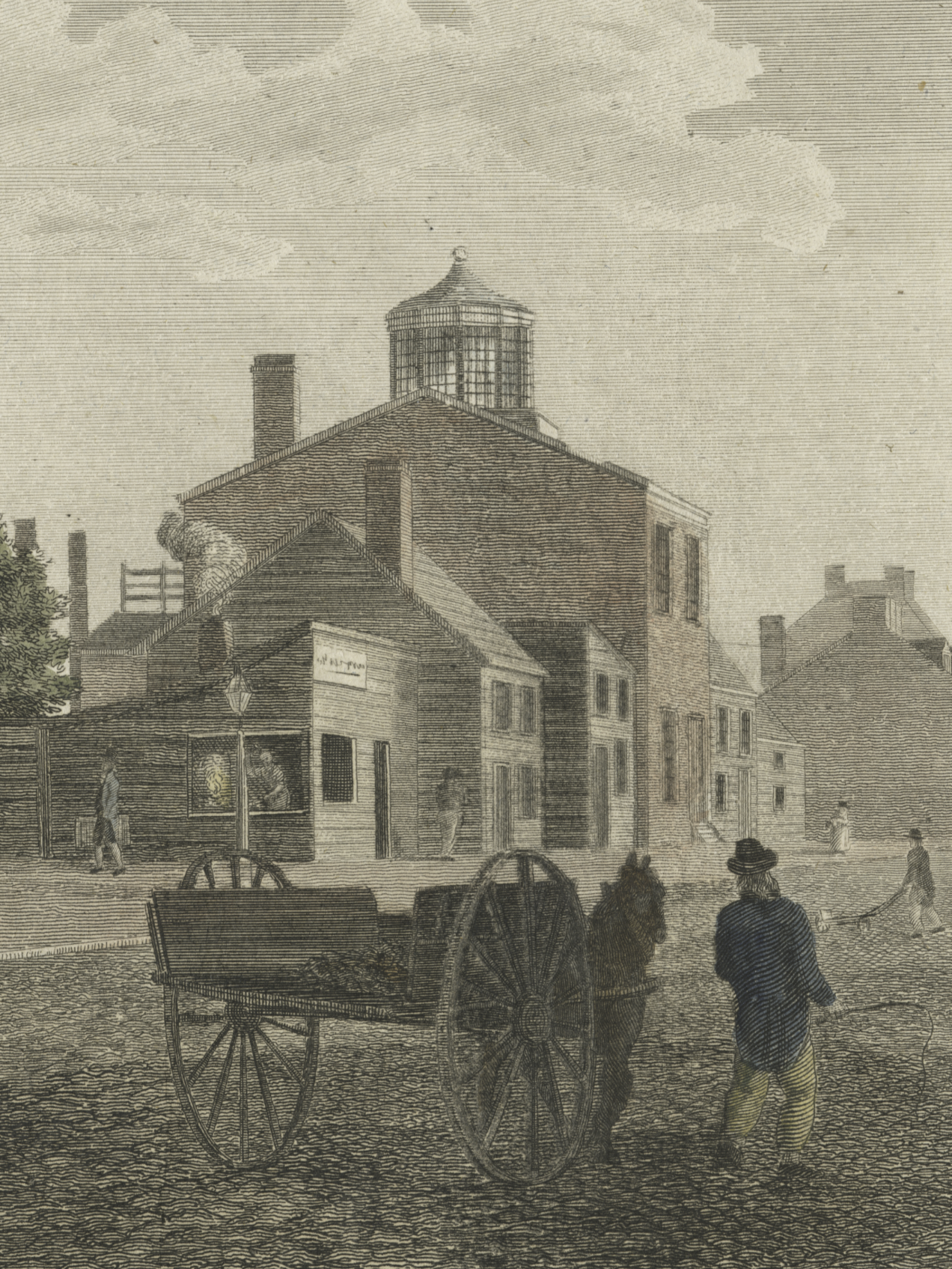
University of Pennsylvania School of Medicine in Philadelphia, founded in 1765 as the College of Philadelphia Department of Medicine, was the first medical school in the United States

There were no schools of law in the early British colonies, thus no schools of law were in America during the colonial times. A few lawyers studied at the highly prestigious Inns of Court in London, while the majority served apprenticeships with established American lawyers. Law was very well established in the colonies, compared to medicine, which was in a more rudimentary condition. In the 18th century, 117 Americans had graduated in medicine in Edinburgh, Scotland, but most physicians in the colonies learned as apprentices. In Philadelphia, the Medical College of Philadelphia was founded in 1765, and became affiliated with the university in 1791. In New York, the medical department of King's College was established in 1767, and in 1770 awarded the first American M.D. degree. It is now Columbia University Vagelos College of Physicians and Surgeons.

On the frontier after 1799, medical professionalism and medical education was heavily influenced by the medical program at Transylvania University in Kentucky, which graduated 8000 doctors by 1860.

=== Colleges for women ===
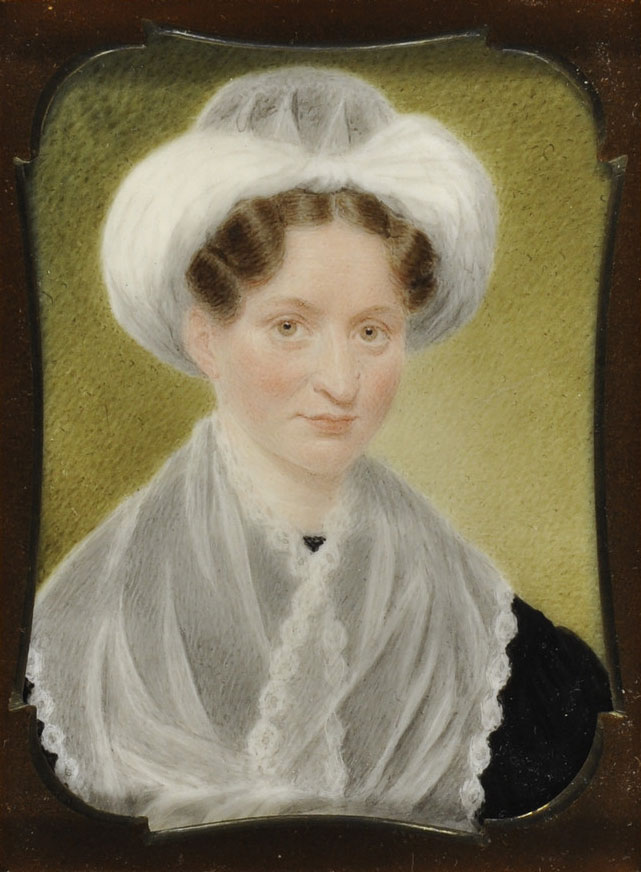
Mary Lyon (1797–1849) founded the first woman's college, Mount Holyoke College in South Hadley, Massachusetts, in 1837

Mary Lyon (1797–1849) founded Mount Holyoke Female Seminary in 1837; it was the first college opened for women and is now Mount Holyoke College, one of the Seven Sisters. Lyon was a deeply religious Congregationalist who, although not a minister, preached revivals at her school. She greatly admired colonial theologian Jonathan Edwards for his theology and his ideals of self-restraint, self-denial, and disinterested benevolence.

Georgia Female College, now Wesleyan College opened in 1839 as the first Southern college for women.

Oberlin College opened in 1833 as Oberlin Collegiate Institute, in a heavily Yankee section of northern Ohio. In 1837, it became the first coeducational college by admitting four women. Soon women were fully integrated into the college, and comprised from a third to half of the student body. Some of Oberlin's early leaders, especially evangelical theologian Charles Grandison Finney, saw women as morally superior to men. Indeed, many alumnae, inspired by this sense of superiority and their personal duty to fulfill God's mission engaged in missionary work. Historians have typically presented coeducation at Oberlin as an enlightened societal development presaging the future evolution of the ideal of equality for women in higher education. Intensely anti-slavery, Oberlin was also the only college to admit black students in the 1830s. By the 1880s, however, with the fading of evangelical idealism, the school began segregating its black students.

The enrollment of women grew steadily after the Civil War. In 1870, 9,100 women comprised 21% of all college students. In 1930, 481,000 women comprised 44% of the student body.

| College women enrollment | Women's colleges | Coed-colleges | % of all students |
|---|---|---|---|
| 1870 | 6,500 | 2,600 | 21% |
| 1890 | 16,800 | 39,500 | 36% |
| 1910 | 34,100 | 106,500 | 40% |
| 1930 | 82,100 | 398,700 | 44% |

=== Colleges for African Americans ===
Along with the destruction of slavery the American Civil War and Reconstruction era emphasized the creation of schools for the African American population in the South that was largely prevented from formal education. Some of these universities eventually became public universities with assistance from the government.

Most "Historically black colleges and universities" (HBCUs) were established in the South with the assistance of religious missionary organizations based in the northern United States. HBCUs established prior to the American Civil War include Cheyney University of Pennsylvania in 1837, University of the District of Columbia (then known as Miner School for Colored Girls) in 1851, and Lincoln University in 1854. Wilberforce University was also established prior to the American Civil War. The university was founded in 1856 via a collaboration between the African Methodist Episcopal Church of Ohio and the predominantly white Methodist Episcopal Church.

Atlanta University – now Clark Atlanta University – was founded on September 19, 1865, as the first HBCU in the Southern United States. Atlanta University was the first graduate institution to award degrees to African Americans in the nation and the first to award bachelor's degrees to African Americans in the South; Clark College (1869) was the nation's first four-year liberal arts college to serve African-American students. The two consolidated in 1988 to form Clark Atlanta University. Shaw University, founded December 1, 1865, was the second HBCU to be established in the South. The year 1865 also saw the foundation of Storer College (1865–1955) in Harper's Ferry, West Virginia. Storer's former campus and buildings have since been incorporated into Harpers Ferry National Historical Park.

Protests at historically black colleges included Shaw University (1919), Fisk University (1924–1925), Howard University (1925) and Hampton Institute (1925, 1927). The protests often involved civil rights issues between black students and white administrators.

African American studies bloomed in colleges during the black power protests and changing cultural views which created a different campus experience. These changes occurred during the civil rights movement and the Vietnam protests. During this time colleges started to change over to be co-educational. More women were then allowed to attend schools that previously only accepted male students. The baby-boomers who were attending college at this time changed many aspects of college life, which included a more inclusive structure for women and minorities.

=== Philanthropy and funding ===
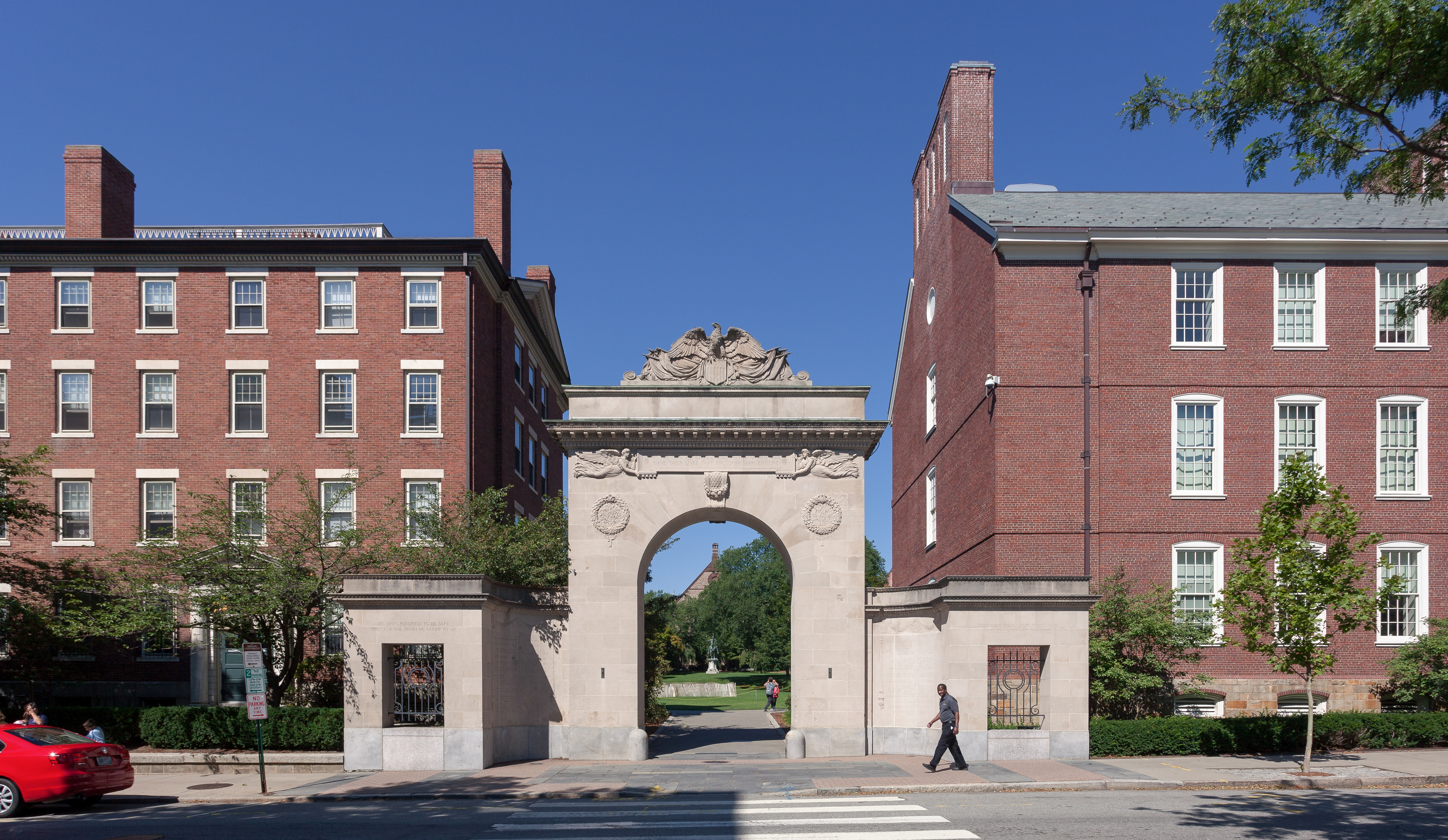
Brown University in Providence, Rhode Island is one of eight prestigious Ivy League universities in the United States that are routinely ranked among the best universities in the world

Local wealthy families supported local schools, especially of their religious denomination, often by donating land. Wealthy philanthropists for example, established Johns Hopkins University, Stanford University, Carnegie Mellon University, Vanderbilt University and Duke University. John D. Rockefeller funded the University of Chicago without imposing his name on it.

Protestant denominations set up funds that by 1830 subsidized about a fourth of the prospective ministers then in college. The American Education Society, founded in 1815, raised funds from local Protestant churches to support their students. Furthermore, it aided academies, colleges, and seminaries and helped to maintain high academic standards. It was a champion of the classical curriculum against the demands for more modern skills.

=== Land Grant universities ===
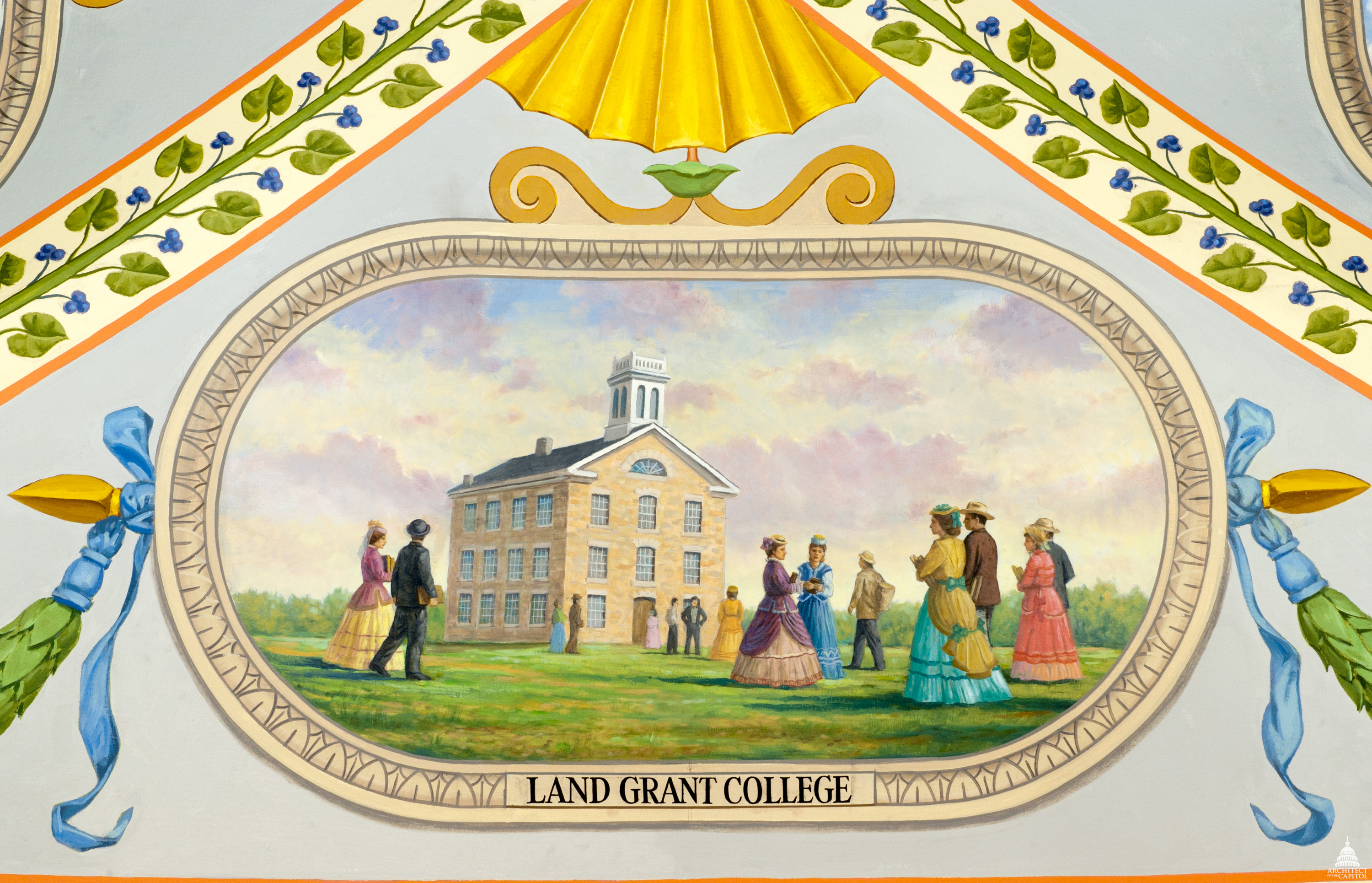
Kansas State University in Manhattan, Kansas was founded as one of the first institutions established under the Morrill Land-Grant Acts

Each state used federal funding from the Morrill Land-Grant Colleges Acts of 1862 and 1890 to set up "land grant colleges" that specialized in agriculture and engineering.

Among the first were Iowa State University, in Iowa, Purdue University in Indiana, Michigan State University, Kansas State University, Cornell University (in New York), Texas A&M University, Pennsylvania State University, The Ohio State University and the University of California. Few alumni became farmers, but they did play an increasingly important role in the larger food industry, especially after the Extension system was set up in 1916 that put trained agronomists in every agricultural county.

The engineering graduates played a major role in rapid technological development. The land-grant college system produced the agricultural scientists and industrial engineers who constituted the critical human resources of the managerial revolution in government and business (1862–1917) laying the foundation of the world's preeminent educational infrastructure that supported the world's technology-based economy.

Pennsylvania State University is an example of this. The Farmers' High School of Pennsylvania (later the Agricultural College of Pennsylvania and then Pennsylvania State University), chartered in 1855, was intended to uphold declining agrarian values and show farmers ways to prosper through more productive farming. Students were instructed to build character and meet a part of their expenses by performing agricultural labor. By 1875, the compulsory labor requirement was dropped, but male students were to have an hour per day of military training in order to meet the requirements of the Morrill Land Grant College Act. In the early years the agricultural curriculum was not well developed, and politicians in Harrisburg often considered it a costly and useless experiment. The college was a center of middle-class values that served to help young people on their journey to white-collar occupations.

==== Black land grant colleges ====
In 1890, Congress funded all-black land grant colleges, which were dedicated primarily to teacher training. These colleges made important contributions to rural development, including the establishment of a traveling school program by the Tuskegee Institute in 1906. Rural conferences sponsored by Tuskegee focused on improving the efficiency and living standards of black farmers. Its founder, Booker T. Washington, was the most influential black spokesman of the 1895–1915 era, and he obtained many academic grants from northern philanthropists and foundations. Starting in 1900, he worked to open connections with educators in Africa; for example he worked with the Phelps-Stokes Fund and the Firestone Rubber Company to design the Booker T. Washington Agricultural and Industrial Institute in Liberia. It was delayed by World War I and opened in 1928, 13 years after Washington's death. Since the 1960s, the 19th century schools had helped train many students from less-developed countries who returned home with the ability to improve agricultural production.

== Twentieth century ==
At the beginning of the 20th century, fewer than 1,000 colleges, with 160,000 students, existed in the United States. Explosive growth in the number of colleges occurred in bursts, especially in 1900–1930 and in 1950–1970. State universities grew from small institutions of fewer than 1000 students to campuses with 40,000 more students, as well as a network of regional campuses around the state. In turn the regional campuses broke away and became separate universities. To handle the growth of K–12 education, every state set up a network of teachers' colleges, beginning with Massachusetts in 1830s. After 1950, they became state colleges and then state universities with a broad curriculum.

College degrees awarded, 1870–2009
| Year | BA degrees | MA degrees | PhD degrees |
|---|---|---|---|
| 1870 | 9,400 | NA | 1 |
| 1890 | 15,500 | 1,000 | 149 |
| 1910 | 37,200 | 2,100 | 440 |
| 1930 | 122,500 | 15,000 | 2,300 |
| 1950 | 432,000 | 58,200 | 6,600 |
| 1970 | 827,000 | 208,000 | 29,900 |
| 1990 | 1,052,000 | 325,000 | 38,000 |
| 2009 | 1,600,000 | 657,000 | 67,000 |
source: census

=== Graduate programs ===
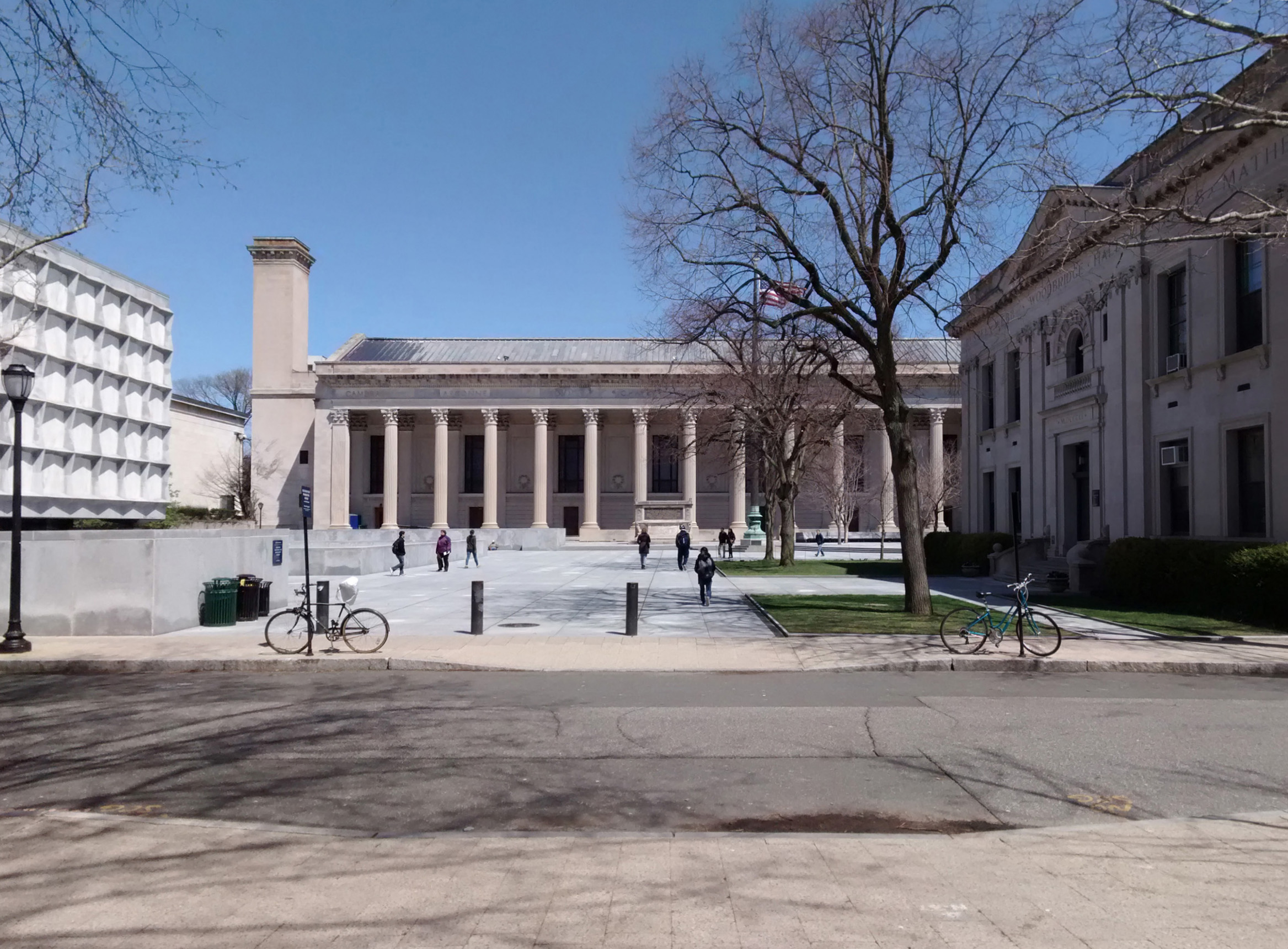
Yale University in New Haven, Connecticut awarded the first Ph.D. degree in the United States in 1861

Advanced degrees were not a criterion for professorships at most colleges. This began to change in the mid-19th century, as thousands of the more ambitious scholars at major schools went to Germany for one to three years to obtain a Doctor of Philosophy (PhD) in the sciences or the humanities. Graduate schools slowly emerged in the United States. In the 1860s and 1870s, Yale and Harvard awarded a few PhD's. The major breakthrough came with the opening of Clark University, which only offered graduate programs, and Johns Hopkins University, which began focusing more seriously on its PhD program. By the 1890s, Harvard, Columbia, Michigan and Wisconsin were building major graduate programs; their alumni were in strong demand at aspiring universities. By 1900, there were 6,000 enrolled graduate students. The six main universities awarded about 300 PhD's annually.

In Germany, the national government funded the universities and the research programs of the leading professors. It was impossible for professors who were not approved by Berlin to train graduate students. In the United States, private universities and state universities alike were independent of the federal government. Independence was high, but funding was low. This began to change when private foundations began regularly supporting research in science and history; large corporations sometimes supported engineering programs. The postdoctoral fellowship was established by the Rockefeller Foundation in 1919. Meanwhile, the leading universities, in cooperation with the academic scholars of the time, set up a network of scholarly journals. "Publish or perish" became the formula for faculty advancement in the research universities. After World War II, state universities across the country expanded greatly in undergraduate enrollment, and eagerly added research programs leading to master's or doctorate degrees. Their graduate faculties had to have a suitable record of publication and research grants. Late in the 20th century, "publish or perish" became increasingly important in colleges and smaller universities, not just large research universities.

=== Junior colleges ===
Major new trends included the development of the junior colleges. They were usually set up by city school systems starting in the 1920s. By the 1960s some were renamed "community colleges".

Junior colleges grew from just 20 in 1909 to 170 in 1919. By 1922, 37 states had set up 70 junior colleges, enrolling about 150 students each. Meanwhile, another 137 were privately operated, with about 60 students each. Rapid expansion continued in the 1920s, with 440 junior colleges in 1930 enrolling about 70,000 students. The peak year for private institutions came in 1949, when there were 322 junior colleges in all; 180 were affiliated with churches, 108 were independent non-profit, and 34 were private Schools run for-profit.

Many factors contributed to rapid growth of community colleges. Students, parents and businessmen wanted nearby, low-cost schools to provide training for the growing white-collar labor force, as well as for more advanced technical jobs in the blue collar sphere. Four-year colleges were also growing, albeit not as fast; however many of them were located in rural or small-town areas away from the fast-growing metropolis. Community colleges continue as open enrollment, low-cost institutions with a strong component of vocational education, as well as a lower-cost preparation for transfer students into four-year schools. They appeal to a poorer, older, less prepared element.

=== Great Depression and New Deal ===
The Great Depression that began in 1929 was a major blow to higher education. Only the richest schools like Harvard had endowments big enough to absorb the losses. Smaller prestigious schools, such as MIT and Northwestern, had to cope with serious cutbacks. Despite appeals from Eleanor Roosevelt, Howard University–the federally operated school for blacks—saw its budget cut below Hoover administration levels.

After the golden years of the 1920s, the downturn hit hard at Northwestern University, a private school in Illinois. Its annual income dropped 25 percent from $4.8 million in 1930–31 to $3.6 million in 1933–34. The endowment investments shrank, fewer parents could pay full tuition, and annual giving from alumni and philanthropy fell from $870,000 in 1932 to a low of $331,000 in 1935. The university responded with two salary cuts of 10 percent each for all employees. It imposed a hiring freeze, a building freeze, and slashed appropriations for maintenance, books, and research. From a balanced budget in 1930–31, the university had deficits in the range of $100,000 for the next four years, which was made up by using the endowment. Enrollments fell in most schools, with law and music hardest hit. However, the movement toward state certification of school teachers enabled Northwestern to open up a new graduate program in education, bringing in a new clientele. At this financial low point, in June 1933, President Robert Maynard Hutchins of the University of Chicago proposed to merge the two universities, estimating annual savings of $1.7 million. The two presidents were enthusiastic, and the faculty were supportive. However, the Northwestern alumni were vehemently opposed, fearing the loss of their traditions. The medical school was oriented toward training practitioners, and felt it would lose its mission if it was merged into the larger, research oriented University of Chicago medical school. The merger plan was thus dropped. The Deering family gave an unrestricted gift of $6 million in 1935 that rescued the budget, bringing it up to $5.4 million in 1938–39. That allowed many of the spending cuts to be restored, including half the salary reductions.

State colleges and universities had depended largely on grants from the legislature, ignoring fund-raising, philanthropy. They kept tuition close to zero. Many were very hard-pressed by the Great Depression—it almost shut down the University of Colorado, as the legislature slashed its budget, there was practically no endowment, and tuition was already very low. The medical school was nearly closed in 1938 – it survived when the legislature allowed it to borrow more money. In 1939. The main campus in Boulder came within a few days of having to close. The bright spot came in the building projects. The PWA spent nearly $1 million on 15 new buildings on the Boulder campus and the medical school campus in Denver. That included a fieldhouse, a natural history museum, new wings for the college of arts and sciences, a faculty club, a small library and a new hospital. The RFC loaned $550,000 in 1933 to build women's dormitories, with the loans repaid through room and board charges.

Indiana University fared much better than most state schools thanks to the entrepreneurship of its young president Herman Wells. He collaborated with Frederick L. Hovde, the president of IU's cross state rival, Purdue; together they approached the Indiana delegation to Congress, indicating their highest priorities. For Wells, it was to build a world-class music school, replacing dilapidated facilities. As a result of these efforts, the Works Progress Administration (WPA) built one of finest facilities in the country. He added matching funds from the state legislature, and opened a full-scale fund-raising campaign among alumni and the business community. In 1942, Wells reported that "The past five years have been the greatest single period of expansion in the physical plant of the university in its entire history. In this period 15 new buildings have been constructed.

Higher education was much too elitist to fit into the New Deal agenda. The educational establishment was ignored. President Franklin Roosevelt even ignored his Commissioner of education John Ward Studebaker and cut his budget. Pleas for emergency assistance for higher education, or for research projects, were rejected. However, relief agencies such as WPA and PWA were in the construction business, and work closely with local and state government which sometimes included new buildings and athletic facilities for public universities. While the New Deal would not give money to colleges or school districts, it did give work-study money to needy students, from high school through graduate school. The average pay scale was $15 a month for part-time work.

=== GI Bill ===
Eager to avoid a repeat of the highly controversial debates over a postwar years and then the bonus to veterans of the first World War, Congress in 1944 passed the G.I. Bill. It was promoted primarily by the veterans organizations, especially the American Legion, and represented a conservative program of financial aid not to poor people, but one limited to veterans who had served in wartime, regardless of their financial situation. The GI Bill made college education possible for millions by paying tuition and living expenses. The government provided between $800 and $1,400 each year to these veterans as a subsidy to attend college, which covered 50–80% of total costs. This included forgone earnings in addition to tuition, which allowed them to have enough funds for life outside of school. It opened up higher education to ambitious young men who would otherwise have been forced to immediately enter the job market. When comparing college attendance rates between veterans and non-veterans during this period, veterans were around 10% more likely to go to college than non-veterans. Most campuses became overwhelmingly male thanks to the GI Bill, since few women were veterans. However, by 2000, women had reached parity in numbers and began passing men in rates of college and graduate school attendance.

=== Great Society ===
Under the leadership of President Lyndon B. Johnson, Congress in 1964, passed numerous Great Society programs that greatly expanded federal support for education. The Higher Education Act of 1965 set up federal scholarships and low-interest loans for college students, and subsidized better academic libraries, ten to twenty new graduate centers, several new technical institutes, classrooms for several hundred thousand students, and twenty-five to thirty new community colleges a year. A separate education bill enacted that same year provided similar assistance to dental and medical schools.

=== For-profit universities ===
A major development of the late twentieth century was the emergence on a very large scale of for-profit higher education institutions. They have traditionally appealed to low-income students, who could borrow money from the federal government to pay the tuition, and to veterans who received tuition money as part of their enlistment bonus. They have become very controversial in the 21st century, because of the high proportion of students who fail to graduate, or who do graduate and fail to get appropriate jobs; many default on repayment of their federal loans as a result. There has been additional concern over for-profit colleges as they fundamentally changed the view of colleges as a public good. As of 2016, some for profit colleges have been sanctioned by federal agencies for preying on vulnerable populations who accrue massive student loan debt in the course of earning a degree that has less value than those obtained from public or private institutions of higher learning. Federal and state officials started cracking down on for-profit universities, and some have gone out of business.

=== Roman Catholic colleges and universities ===
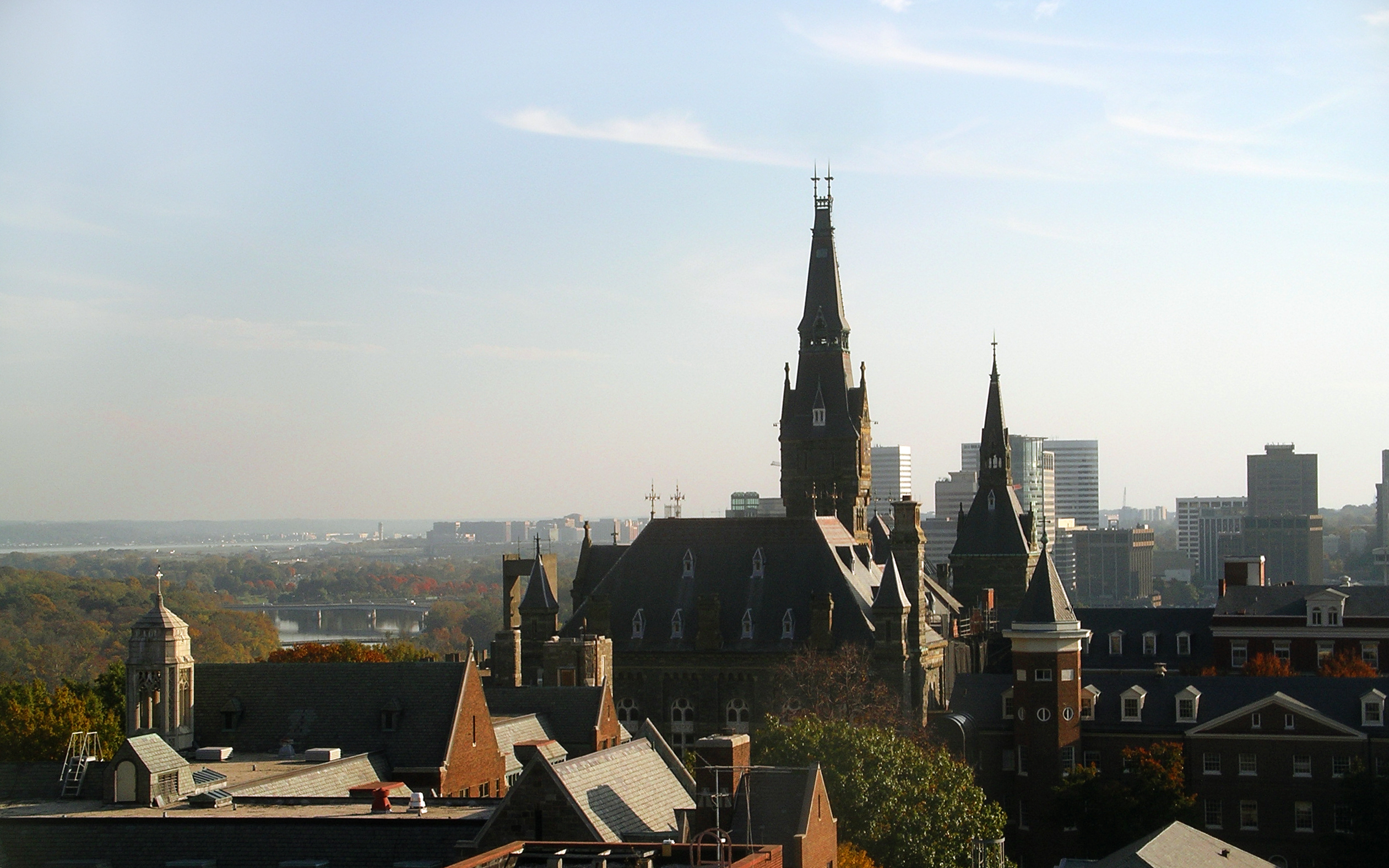
Georgetown University in Washington, D.C. was the first Catholic institution of higher education founded in the United States

The first Catholic college in the United States was Georgetown University, founded in Georgetown (now Washington, D.C.). Some of the small colleges of the 19th century have become major universities and integrated into the mainstream academic community.

The Association of Catholic Colleges and Universities was founded in 1899 and continues to facilitate the exchange of information and methods. Vigorous debate in recent decades has focused on how to balance Catholic and academic roles, with conservatives arguing that bishops should exert more control to guarantee orthodoxy.

The orders of nuns, and some dioceses, founded numerous colleges for women. The first was the College of Notre Dame of Maryland, which opened elementary and secondary schools in Baltimore in 1873 and a four-year college in 1895. It added graduate programs in the 1980s that accepted men and is now Notre Dame of Maryland University. Another 42 women's colleges opened by 1925. By 1955, there were 116 Catholic colleges for women. Most—but not all of them—went co-ed, merged, or closed after 1970.

== Twenty-first century ==
The twenty-first century has been characterized by the growth of for-profit higher education, including the continued evolution of online learning. By 2010, student enrollment had peaked, and enrollment at community colleges, for-profit colleges, regional institutions, and smaller colleges and universities began to drop. But online education, boosted by online program managers continued to grow.

In 2020 and 2021, the federal government provided billions of dollars in relief to schools that suffered from the COVID-19 pandemic.

A number of faculty and student worker strikes occurred in the 2020s, including Columbia University in 2021, the University of California System in 2022 and Rutgers in 2023.

In 2024, students at more than 20 colleges staged protests about the genocide in Palestine, in some cases demanding that their schools divest in Israeli companies. At least 1000 students and faculty members were arrested.

== See also ==
- University § History
- History of education in the United States
  - History of secondary education in the United States
- Asian quota
- Doctor of Philosophy
- Graduate school
- List of fields of doctoral studies
- History of college campuses and architecture in the United States
- History of Catholic education in the United States
- Hispanic-Serving institution, of higher education in USA
- Jewish quota
- Normal schools in the United States, historical coverage of teacher training in major states
