= Leonard Abbott =

British-American politician (1878–1953)

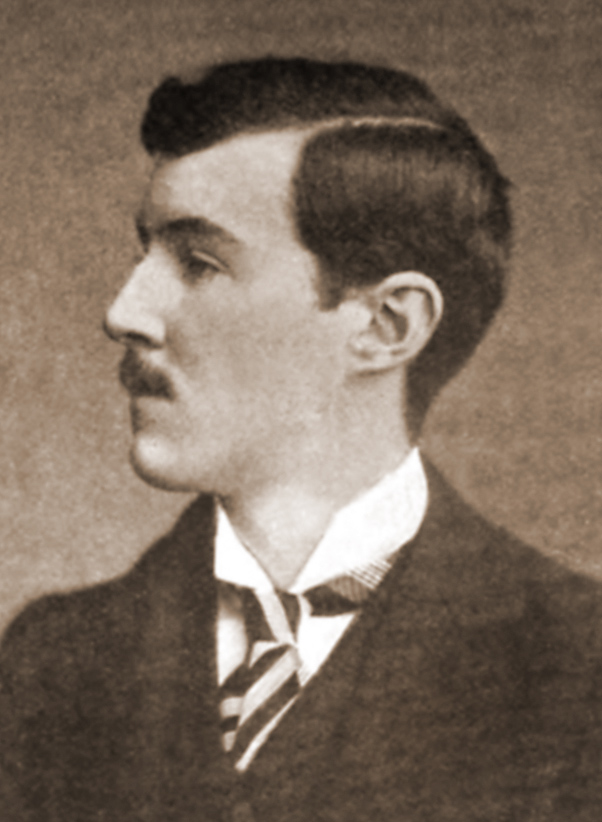
- Born: Leonard Dalton Abbott; May 20, 1878; Liverpool, England
- Died: March 19, 1953 (aged 74); New York City, U.S.
- Known for: Stelton Colony; Ferrer Association
- Notable work: The Society of the Future (1898); Sociology and Political Economy (1909); Masterworks of Government (1947)
- Political party: Socialist
- Relatives: Clinton Gilbert Abbott (brother)

Leonard Dalton Abbott (May 20, 1878 – March 19, 1953) was a British-born American anarchist and socialist best known for co-founding the Stelton Colony and related Ferrer Association in the 1910s.

== Life and activism ==
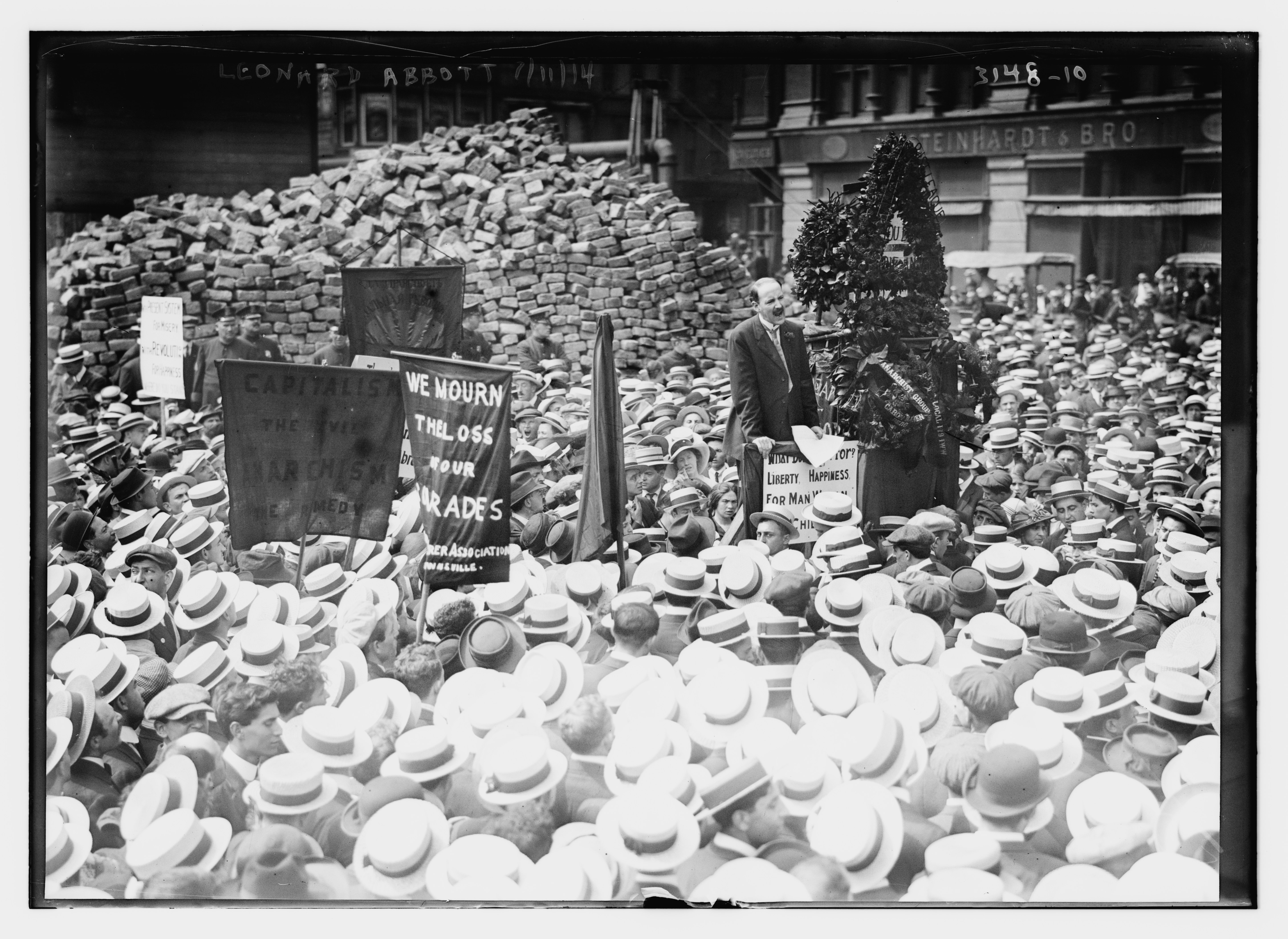
Abbott speaking before a crowd, 1910

Leonard Abbott was born in Liverpool on May 20, 1878, to an American expatriate family. His father was a metal merchant in the British city for an American firm. Raised and schooled in England, Abbott attended the upper-class, public Uppingham School. Having read Thomas Paine's The Age of Reason in his youth, Abbott eschewed college, whose tuition his family could have afforded, and chose to pursue social issues and a conventional career as a magazine editor upon immigrating to the United States in 1898. He wrote for The Literary Digest and later became associate editor of Current Digest, which he served for a quarter century.

Abbott was radicalized through the free speech movement in the Progressive Era, as anarchists were repressed their civil liberties. He would later become the Free Speech League's president after 1907. Abbott met the anarchist Emma Goldman soon after immigrating and turned towards libertarianism via his friend, the individualist anarchist J. William Lloyd. The two published Free Comrade sporadically between 1900 and 1912.

Simultaneously, Abbott served multiple organizations for social causes. Influenced by William Morris, Abbott joined the executive board of the Socialist Party of America in 1900 and the founding board of the Rand School of Social Science in 1906. He introduced Upton Sinclair to socialism in 1902 with an edition of Wilshire's Magazine. At the turn of the century, Abbott wrote on socialism in America for the British Labour Annual, helped with a socialist publication based in Chicago, and would continue to write pamphlets and for multiple other publications over the remainder of his career.

Moved by the execution of Francisco Ferrer in 1909, Abbott edited a volume about Ferrer's life and became the public face of the anarchist New York Ferrer Association. His British accent and aristocratic manners made him an unlikely yet successful advocate for radical politics. But Abbott became best known as a leader of the New Jersey Ferrer Colony, which he helped to split from the Association in 1916 following its 1914 move. His abilities to summarize and popularize were among his talents.

As the anarchism movement ebbed, Abbott moved to socialism in 1917. While Abbott followed anarchism as a social philosophy and believed in its liberatory fight against oppression, historian Laurence Veysey wrote that Abbott vacillated between socialism and anarchism and never committed fully to the latter. In the middle of the Ferrer affair, Abbott wrote that radical ideas stirred his spirit, and he pursued them almost impulsively, but he believed in principles of self-development and individualism on balance with conservative values, such as self-sacrifice. He wrote that he wanted to feel his radical beliefs with greater ardor.

In the 1930s, Abbott worked for the Works Progress Administration in Washington, D.C. He died in New York City on March 19, 1953.

== Personal life ==
Abbott named his daughter, who died in infancy in 1914, after the anarchist Voltairine de Cleyre.

== Selected works ==
- The Society of the Future (1898)
- A Socialistic Wedding: Being the Account of the Marriage of George D. Herron and Carrie Rand (1901)
- The Root of the Social Problem (1904)
- Ernest Howard Crosby: A Valuation and a Tribute (1907)
- Sociology and Political Economy (1909)
- Francisco Ferrer, His Life, Work, Martyrdom (1910)
- Masterworks of Economics (1946)
- Masterworks of Government (1947)

== Bibliography ==
- Bennett, Edward B., ed. (1891). "Lewis Lowe Abbott". Record of Class Meetings and the Biographical History of the Class of 1866, Yale College. Hartford, Connecticut: Press of the Case, Lockwood & Brainard Company. p. 10.
- Falk, Candace, ed. (2008). "Abbott, Leonard Dalton". Emma Goldman: A Documentary History of the American Years, Vol. 2: Making Speech Free, 1902–1909. University of Illinois Press. p. 507. ISBN 978-0-252-07543-8.
- Fogarty, Robert S. (1980). "Abbott, Leonard". Dictionary of American Communal and Utopian History. Westport, Connecticut: Greenwood Press. pp. 3–4. ISBN 978-0-313-21347-2. OCLC 251590189.
- Veysey, Laurence (1973). "The Ferrer Colony and Modern School". The Communal Experience: Anarchist and Mystical Counter-Cultures in America. New York: Harper & Row. pp. 77–177. ISBN 978-0-06-014501-9.
