= Campus =

Cluster of buildings and land used by an institution

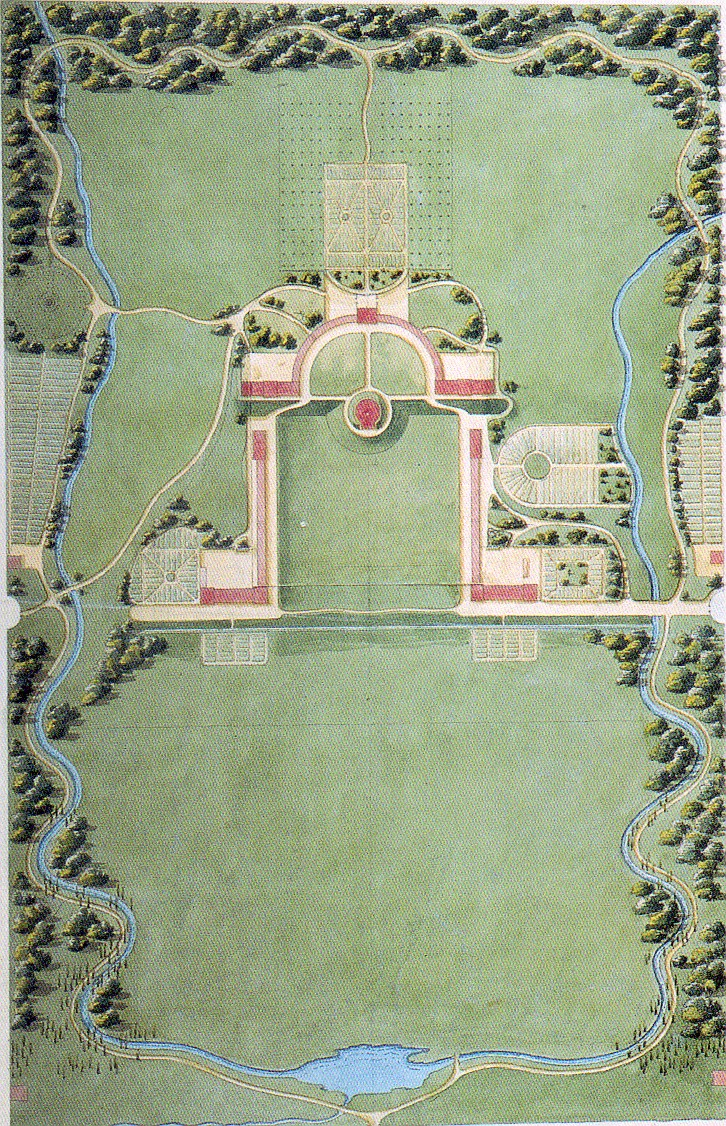
Joseph-Jacques Ramée's original plan for Union College in Schenectady, New York, the first comprehensively planned campus in the United States

Map of the main campus of Université Laval in Quebec City, Canada

A campus traditionally refers to the land and buildings of a college or university. This will often include libraries, lecture halls, student centers and, for residential universities, residence halls and dining halls.

By extension, a corporate campus is a collection of buildings and grounds that belong to a company, particularly in the technology sector. Examples include Bell Labs, the Googleplex and Apple Park.

== Etymology ==
Campus comes from the Latin: campus, meaning "field", and was first used in the academic sense at Princeton University in 1774. At Princeton, the word referred to a large open space on the college grounds; similarly at the University of South Carolina it was used by 1826 to describe the open square (of around 10 acres) between the college buildings. By the end of the 19th century, the term was used widely at US colleges to refer to the grounds of the college, but it was not until the 20th century that it expanded to include the buildings as well.

== History ==
The tradition of a campus began with the medieval European universities where the students and teachers lived and worked together in a cloistered environment. The notion of the importance of the setting to academic life later migrated to America, and early colonial educational institutions were based on the Scottish and English collegiate system.

The campus evolved from the cloistered model in Europe to a diverse set of independent styles in the United States. Early colonial colleges were all built in proprietary styles, with some contained in single buildings, such as the campus of Princeton University or arranged in a version of the cloister reflecting American values, such as Harvard's. Both the campus designs and the architecture of colleges throughout the country have evolved in response to trends in the broader world, with most representing several different contemporary and historical styles and arrangements.

In 1922, a lecture by Patrick Abercrombie at the British Town Planning Institute contrasted the American campus to the style of Oxbridge colleges, saying: "generally with us the park-like garden and trees are to one side of the college buildings, in contrast with the formally enclosed quad with its clipt grass. In the Campus method the departments of the university are scattered about a park and are actually among the trees." However, he did also note that Trinity College Dublin had "what is called elsewhere a Campus" on its 28-acre (11 ha) site in central Dublin, and that William Wilkins had "attempt[ed] an English Campus" on the 20-acre (8.1 ha) site of Downing College, Cambridge.

The first true campus universities in Britain were not established until the late 1940s, with the University of Reading moving to its Whiteknights campus in 1947, University College Swansea (now Swansea University) moving to its Singleton Park campus in 1948 and the University College of North Staffordshire (now the University of Keele) being established on the Keele Hall estate in 1949.

== Uses ==
=== Office buildings ===
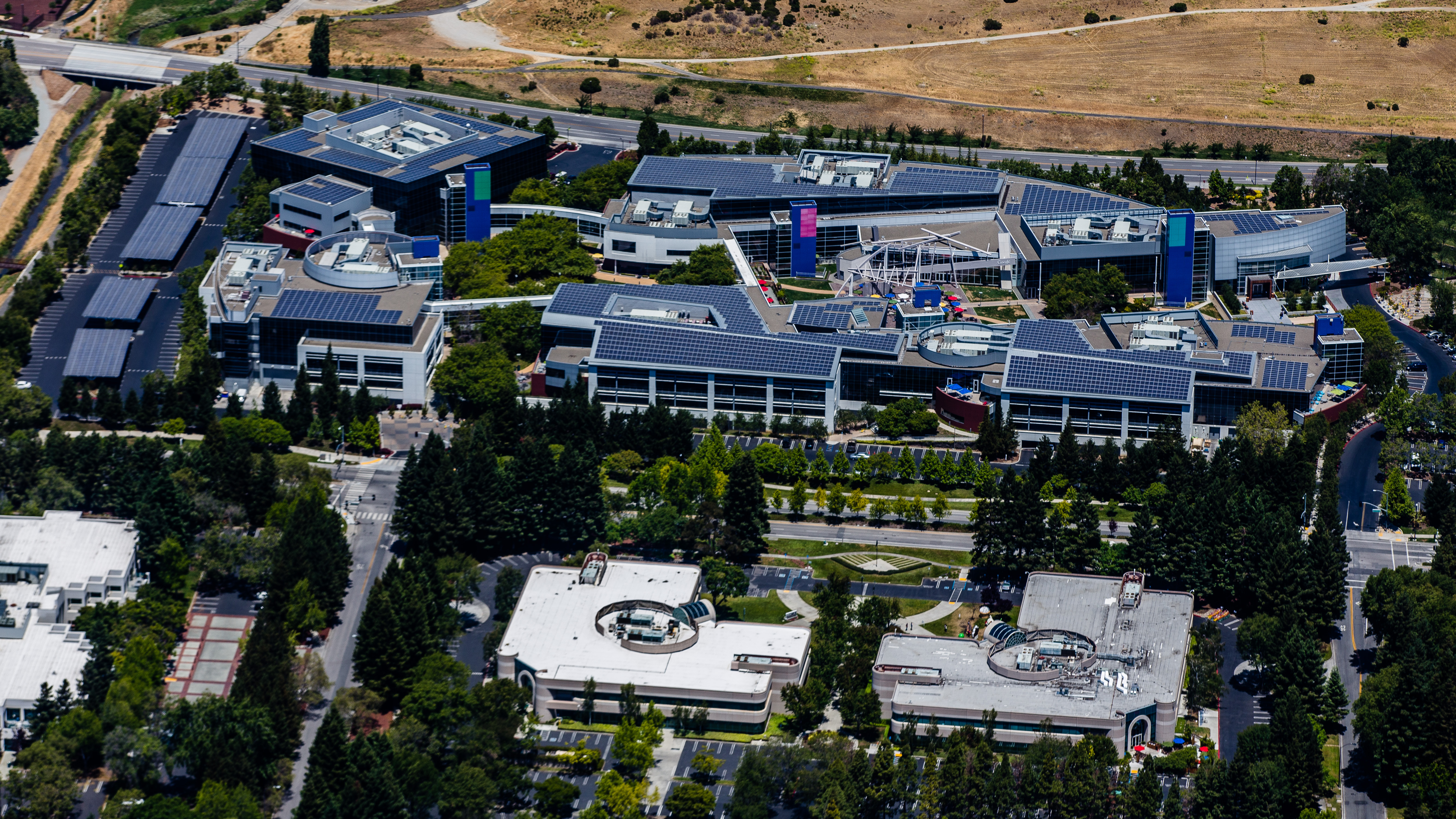
The Googleplex, a corporate campus in California

In the early 1990s the term began to be used to describe a company's office building complex, most notably when Apple's Infinite Loop campus was first built, which at the time was exclusively for research and development. The Microsoft Campus in Redmond, Washington, is another example of this usage, although it was built in the 1980s, before the term was applied to company property. In the 21st century, hospitals and even airports sometimes use the term to describe the territory of their respective facilities.

=== Universities ===
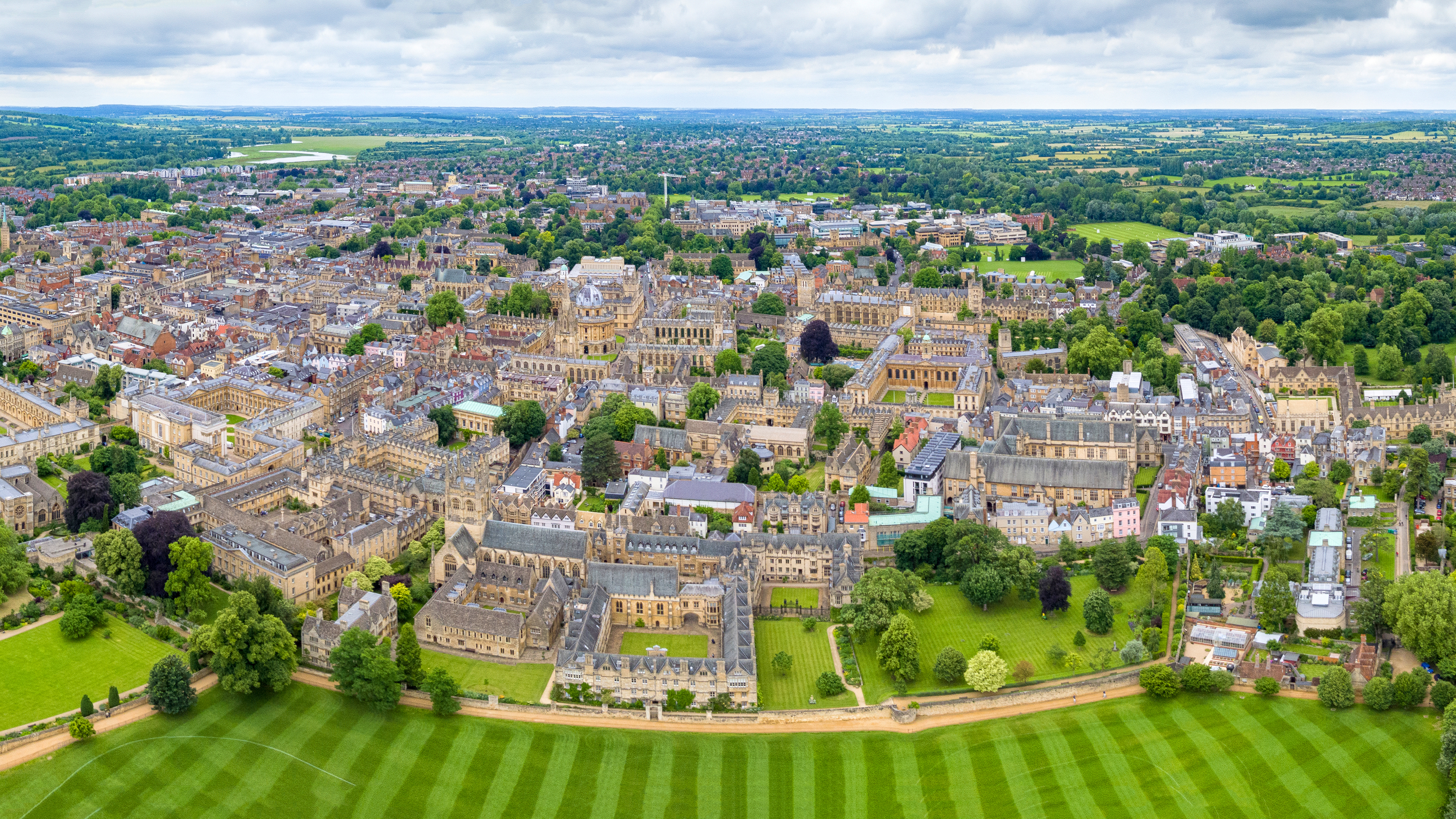
A 2016 aerial panorama of Oxford. The University of Oxford does not have a central campus; the university's many buildings are instead scattered around the city.

The word campus has also been applied to European universities, although some such institutions (in particular, "ancient" universities such as Bologna, Padua, Oxford and Cambridge) are characterized by ownership of individual buildings in university town-like urban settings rather than sprawling park-like lawns in which buildings are placed.

== World Heritage campuses ==
A number of university campuses or parts of campuses have been recognised as World Heritage Sites by UNESCO for their outstanding universal value. These include:

- Botanical Garden, University of Padua, Italy – the world's oldest botanical garden (inscribed 1997)
- Central University City Campus of the Universidad Nacional Autónoma de México, Mexico (inscribed 2007)
- Durham Castle and Cathedral, UK – including University College, Durham (Durham Castle) and the historic centre of Durham University around Palace Green (inscribed 1986; modified 2008)
- Medina of Fez, Morocco – including the University of al-Qarawiyyin (inscribed 1981)
- Monticello and the University of Virginia in Charlottesville, US – including the Rotunda and the historic centre of the university around the Lawn (inscribed 1987; modified 2015)
- University City of Caracas, Venezuela – the main campus of the Central University of Venezuela (inscribed 2000)
- University of Alcalá de Henares, Spain – the world's first planned university city (inscribed 1998)
- University of Coimbra, Portugal (inscribed 2013; modified 2019)

== See also ==
- Campus novel
- Campus university
- History of college campuses and architecture in the United States
- Satellite campus
