= The Emergence of the American University =

Non-fiction book about education

- 1970 edition
- Author: Laurence Veysey
- Language: English
- Genre: Non-fiction
- Publisher: University of Chicago Press
- Publication date: 1965
- Publication place: United States

The Emergence of the American University is a non-fiction book in the history of education by Laurence Veysey, published in 1965 by University of Chicago Press. It "trac[es] the development of the modern American university during its formative years from 1865 to 1910". It is based on and shortened from Veysey's doctoral dissertation.

Veysey explained how higher education was revolutionized after 1865 by the creation of the modern university. Stressing Johns Hopkins, Cornell, Clark, Harvard, Yale, Columbia, Michigan, Chicago, Stanford and Berkeley, Veysey showed how the newly created and newly reformed schools were influenced by German approaches that taught new findings based on experimental and empirical research techniques. The new model rejected the British model that reiterated over and over the Latin and Greek classics. The new university introduced new teaching methods such as lectures and seminars. It made graduate school training, culminating in the PhD, the mark of the true scholar. The doctoral dissertation required students to create new knowledge, preferably through experimental methods or research in original sources. The new land grant state universities generally followed the new model and deemphasized classical Latin and Greek while adding more science, technology, industrial engineering and agricultural science.

Deemed "a major contribution to the history and sociology of American education" when first published, the book continues to garner attention decades after its publication. Kevin Carey says "Fifty years later, the ideas Veysey developed in two years of white-hot scholarly intensity continue to shape our basic understanding of academe."

Christopher Loss called it the "founding text" "for historians interested in tracking the organization, production, and consumption of knowledge in the United States", introducing a 2005 special issue. This 2005 special issue of History of Education Quarterly contains an introduction and 6 essays reflecting on the book, along with an obituary of Veysey, who died in 2004.
