= History of college campuses and architecture in the United States =

Aspect of American architectural history

The history of college campuses in the United States begins in 1636 with the founding of Harvard College in Cambridge, Massachusetts, then known as New Towne. Early colonial colleges, which included not only Harvard, but also College of William & Mary, Yale University and The College of New Jersey (now Princeton University), were modeled after equivalent English and Scottish institutions, but American establishments gradually split with their forebears, both physically and academically.

The earliest American colleges and universities were all affiliated with different Christian denominations; Brown, for example, was founded by Baptists, while the Columbia University (then King's College) was founded by the Church of England. These religious affiliations colored the architectural texture and geographical placement of early colleges, with emphasis placed on the construction of religious facilities, and a desire for colleges to be rural, so as to avoid the vices anecdotally associated with large towns and cities.

As colleges developed and increased in number, many strayed from their religious affiliations, or were founded without one. Architecturally, colleges also diversified, with different philosophies of campus planning emerging. Perhaps the most enduring style to be produced on American campuses is Collegiate Gothic, but there are diverse vernacular and local styles, such as the Arts and Crafts campus at Principia College designed by Bernard Maybeck and the Cherokee Gothic buildings at the University of Oklahoma.

== Predecessor institutions ==
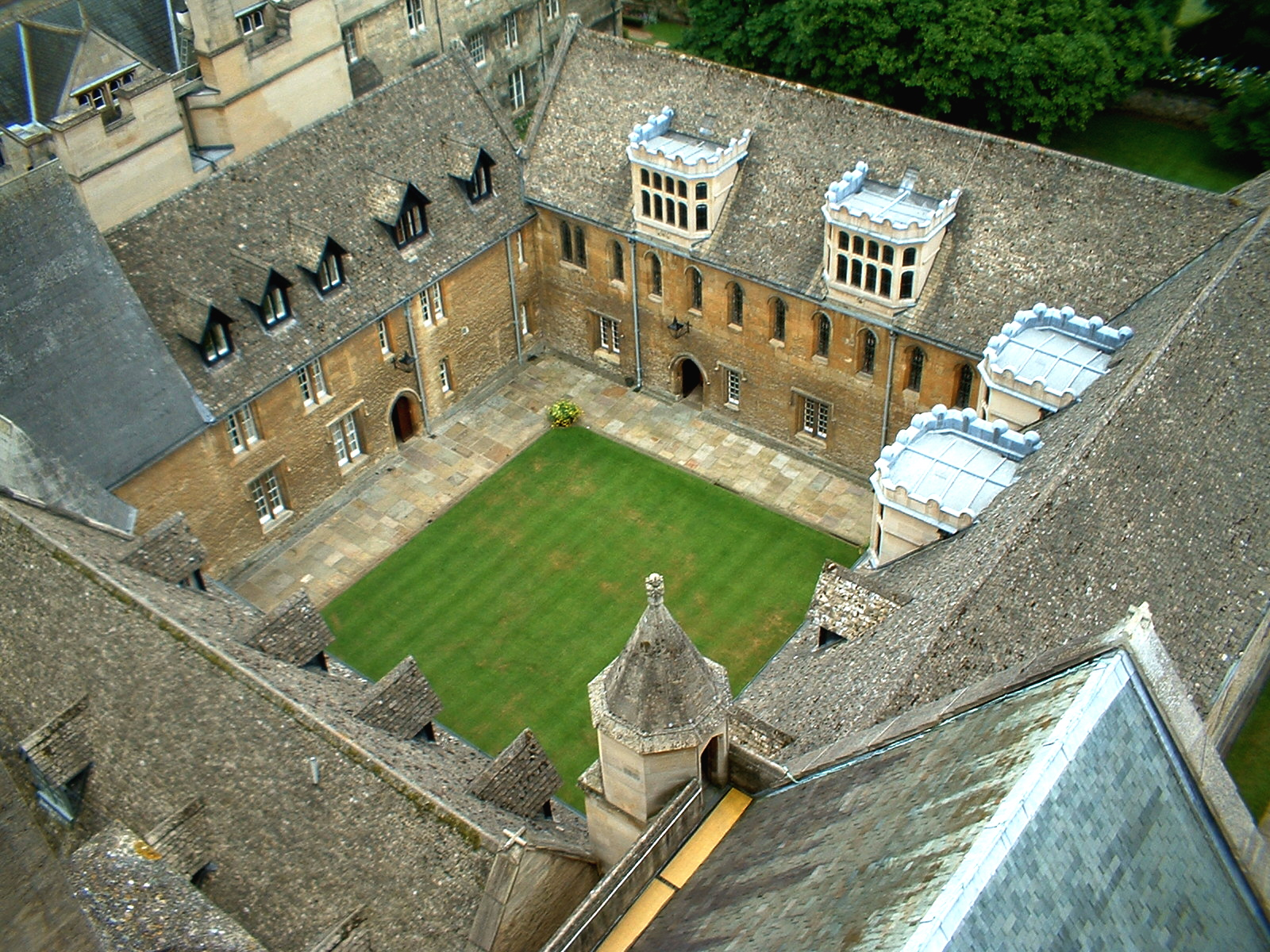
Aerial view of Merton College's Mob Quad, the oldest quadrangle of the university, constructed in the years from 1288 to 1378

The Colonial Colleges were modeled, at least in their educational goals, on their earlier British equivalents, specifically Oxford University and Cambridge University. British institutions were mostly cloistered and modeled after earlier Monastic complexes, which were designed to be shut off from the secular world. This format was also space efficient, given that Oxford and Cambridge were established cities developing alongside their respective academies. This arrangement also provided a defensive advantage, in the event of difficulty from townspeople or warfare. Oxford experienced such tension early in its history, and after issues between local citizens and the university, some departed to found what would become Cambridge.

Oxford and Cambridge were separated into smaller colleges, which were organized around green spaces. American colleges diverged in their use of space; few of the earliest colleges were organized in ways similar to English institutions. Americans also differed in their educational practices. Oxford and Cambridge were, during the British colonization of North America, liberal relative to their American counterparts, which were founded as religious institutions.

== Colonial colleges ==
The word campus was first used in reference to Princeton's original building and the land that separated it from the neighboring town. The term comes from the Latin, meaning a field. Although the term originally referred only to the unique green spaces that characterized American colleges, it later came to refer to the whole property.

Sources note the speed with which colonists founded their colleges, suggesting the importance of education to early Americans. The first established was Harvard University, and, along with William and Mary, and Princeton, their importance was further suggested by the massive edifices they erected, with several different schools claiming the largest building in the British colonies. Most of the thirteen original colonies had institutions, and most were located in rural settings, originally to educate and convert Native Americans, and later due to American skepticism of cities as centers of vice and the appeal of nature as an opposing locale devoid of temptation.

=== Campus organization ===
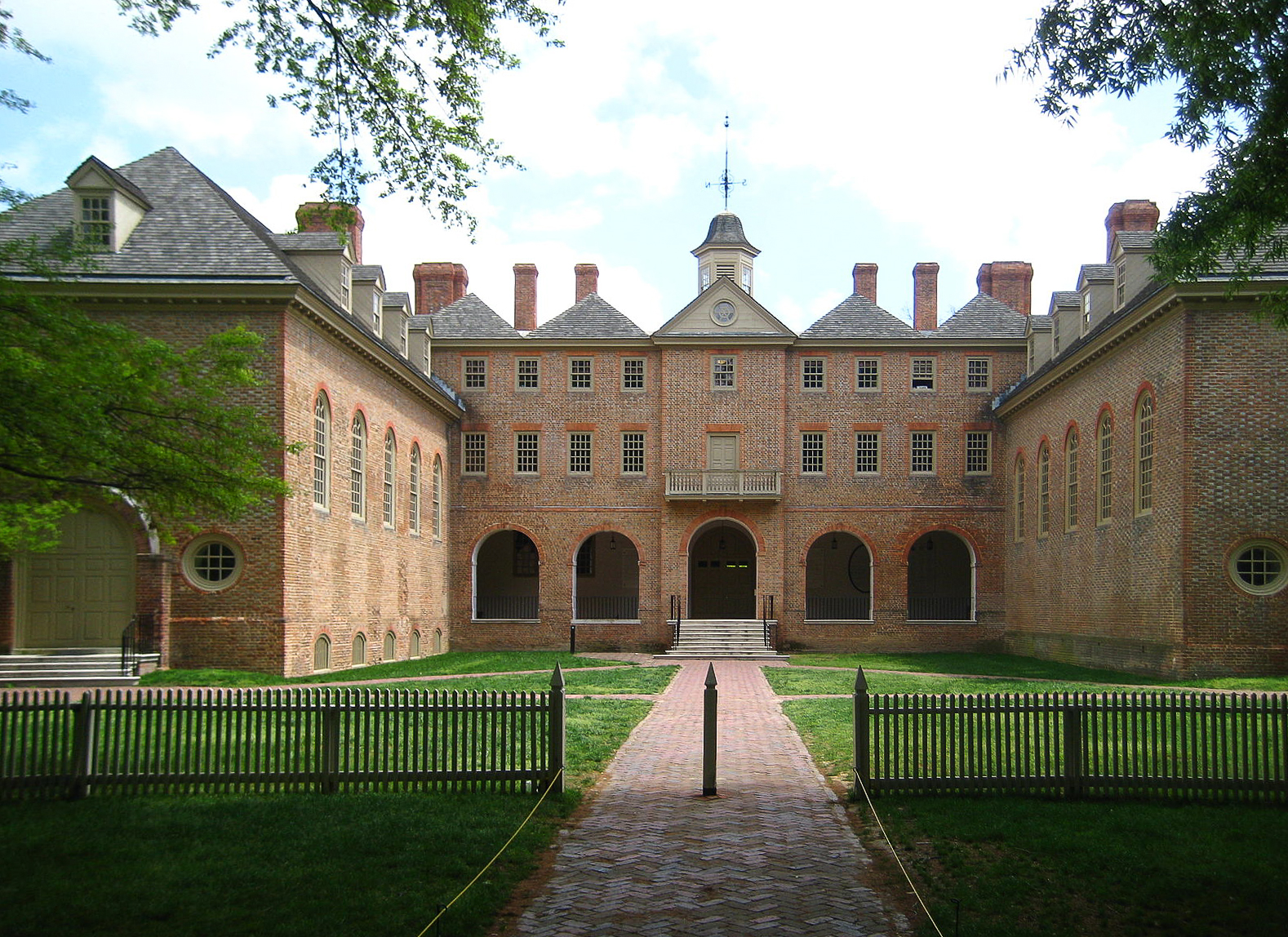
The rear of the Wren Building as it stands today

Although Oxford and Cambridge diverged slightly in terms of architectural styles, the colonial colleges did so to a much greater degree. Harvard was originally a single building, which was later expanded to four, forming an open quadrangle (the buildings were freestanding) that represented a union between Puritan ideals and the designs of Oxford and Cambridge. By the end of the colonial period, additional buildings formed a row of sorts, made more welcoming than enclosed quadrangles in England by the separation of buildings, an American innovation made necessary by fear of fire, something absent in England due to the use of masonry and stone, not wood, in construction.

William and Mary's campus design similarly rejected the enclosed quadrangle, and was originally a single building that burned, to be replaced later by a single structure, the Wren Building, named for its purported designer Christopher Wren. The newer building was three sided, open on the fourth, in a style favored by Wren; he disliked four sided, monastic-style constructions. Later, there were small additions to the campus in the form of two structures, a house for the college president and the so-called "Indian School", making the campus resemble an English country estate, similar to those inspired by the work of architect Andrea Palladio.

As with William and Mary, Princeton was organized around a single building, and unlike William and Mary, few additions were made to the campus during the colonial period. The building, Nassau Hall, was considered to be one of the most imposing and largest in colonial America, and was widely reproduced by other schools in later years – such is the case with University Hall at Brown, for example. Yale's early plans were equally influential. Entirely rejecting the quadrangle, Yale's first buildings were narrow, and aligned in a row, forming a wall facing the town of New Haven.

== Expansion and diversification ==
After the American Revolution, there was a proliferation of colleges, with at least forty-five extant by the 1820s. Like their colonial predecessors, these were affiliated with Christian denominations, albeit ones increasingly obscure and minute. Also like their predecessors, these were primarily rural. Unlike in contemporary layouts, there was little emphasis on now-essential structures; curricula heavy on memorization and subsequent recitation meant there was no need for large lecture halls or libraries. However, American collegiate administrations exerted control over their students' extracurricular lives, necessitating the construction of extensive dormitories, kitchen facilities, and lavatories.

New universities mimicked the layouts of Yale, William and Mary, and Princeton, while others developed innovative plans. The University of North Carolina first used the mall model, in which buildings were arranged facing one another down a central avenue of green space. The University of South Carolina (then known as South Carolina College) later hosted a contest open to architects, which was won by Robert Mills. He planned a campus similar to Princeton's, contained within a single structure, but ultimately its campus was also designed around a mall.

=== Architectural developments ===
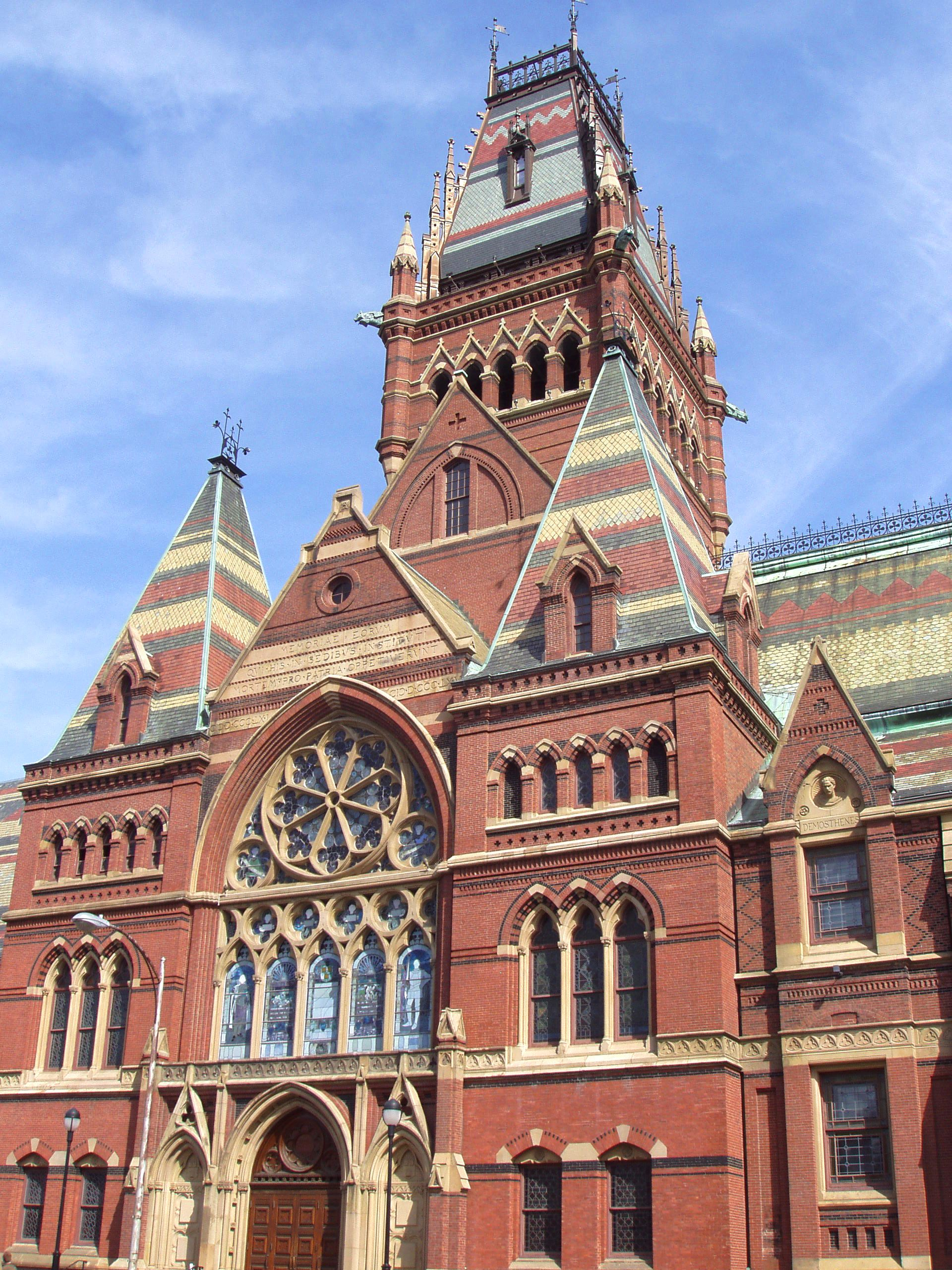
Memorial Hall at Harvard University, an example of Ruskinian Gothic

Early 18th century campuses were dominated by Greek Revival architecture, which emulated traditional Classical architecture. This inspiration influenced both individual buildings and general layouts, with new emphasis placed on symmetry. An example of such structures are the Whig and Cliosophic Halls at Princeton, designed by Joseph Henry, which are similar to Greek temples and symmetrical both in their design and their placement on Princeton's campus.

The interest in Classical architecture was met with equal interest, beginning in the 1830s, in Gothic architecture, leading to the Gothic Revival. The interest in Gothic design stemmed from the mistaken view that the style had originated in England, and the shift was predominantly led by Anglican colleges and their administrations, including that of Columbia University. Among the major uses of the Gothic in the United States, the two campuses designed by Philander Chase (that of Kenyon College and that of the now defunct Jubilee College) were some of the most notable, although Jubilee College's construction was never finished. Kenyon College's central building, Old Kenyon, was the first collegiate building in the United States to be designed in the Gothic style. The Gothic was not a monolithic style; the Ruskinian Gothic, for example, differed in coloration and overall aesthetic, enough that some consider it to be wholly distinct from other Gothic forms.

This period was also marked by the emergence of space between buildings, a distinct break with earlier campuses, such as Virginia's and Yale's, where buildings were organized in proprietary patterns in which buildings were placed closely together.

=== Campus planning and professionalization ===
Perhaps more so than any individual style, this period is defined by the rise of the professional designers and architects of college campuses, such as Benjamin Henry Latrobe, and of the origins of precedents for the master plan.

== Land grant schools and democratization of education ==
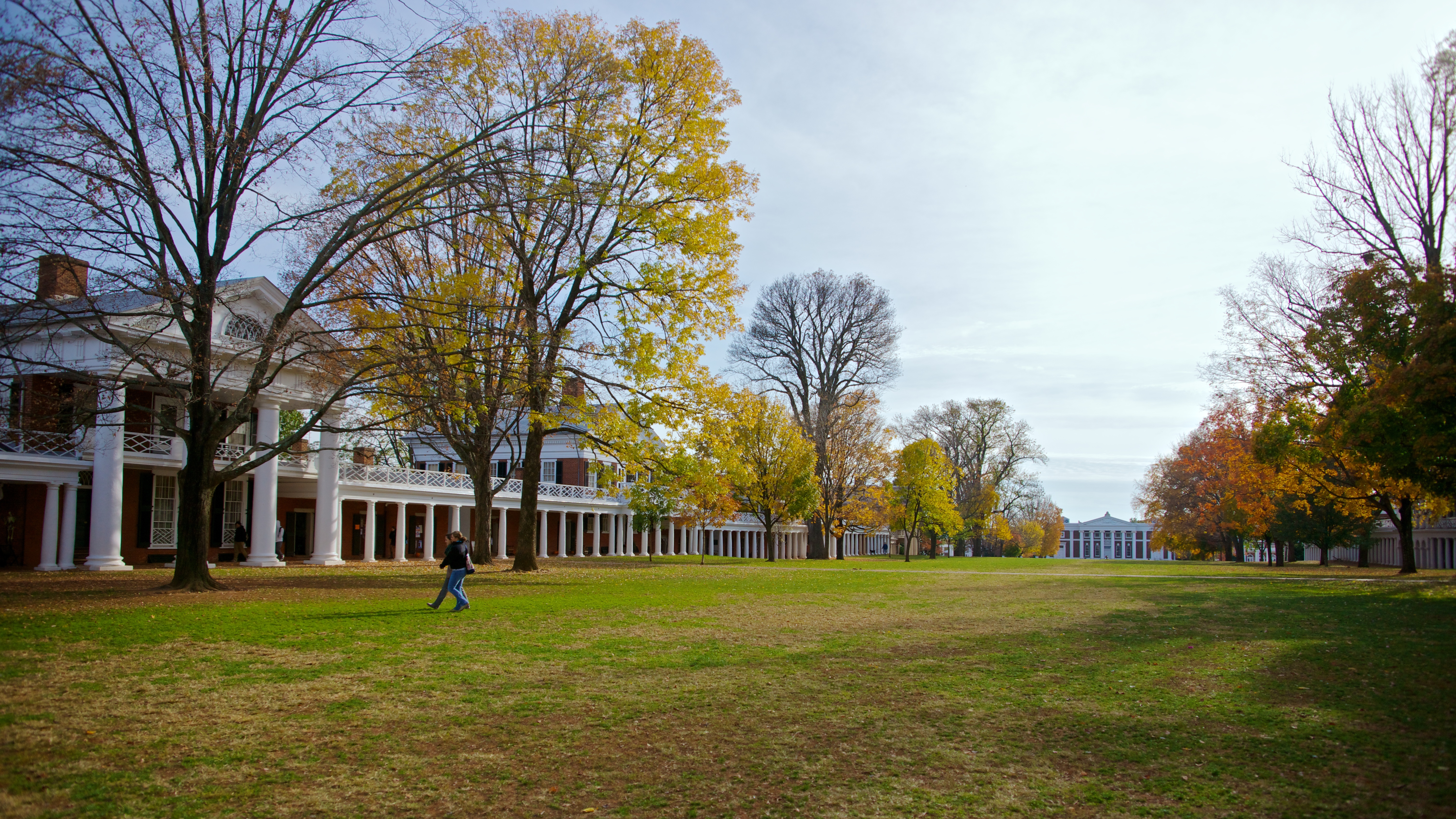
The University of Virginia campus, designed by Thomas Jefferson

During the Civil War, the first of the Morrill Land-Grant Acts was passed, in 1862. This first act responded to calls for colleges and universities that served "the people" through the instruction of practical skills, and support for agricultural and industrial research. Colleges that filled that niche before the Morrill Act were utilitarian in their design, eschewing the more ornate architecture used on other campuses, and placing emphasis on the usefulness and modularity of spaces.

Frederick Law Olmsted was a key figure in the development of the physical presence of the land grant colleges. He placed on emphasis of the integration of the campus into the local community, stressing that their placement should be neither rural nor urban. His philosophy of planning was practical, based on the slow integration of smaller buildings as they became necessary, rather than the all-at-once construction of a single large building, or several large buildings. Olmsted was consulted concerning the planning of at least twenty different schools, and although some (such as the Massachusetts Agricultural College) did not take his advice, many others did. This led to the picturesque, park-like nature of many land grant campuses, although few have continued to build in his style.

=== Women's colleges ===
Generally, the campuses of colleges and universities for women, originating in the 1850s, were rural, and campuses generally featured a single building for the housing of all the college's functions. This was justified as a means of protecting and controlling students, as well as providing a family-like atmosphere. By the 1870s, the concept of a single building housing all college functions became outdated due to its impracticality.

== Late 19th century ==
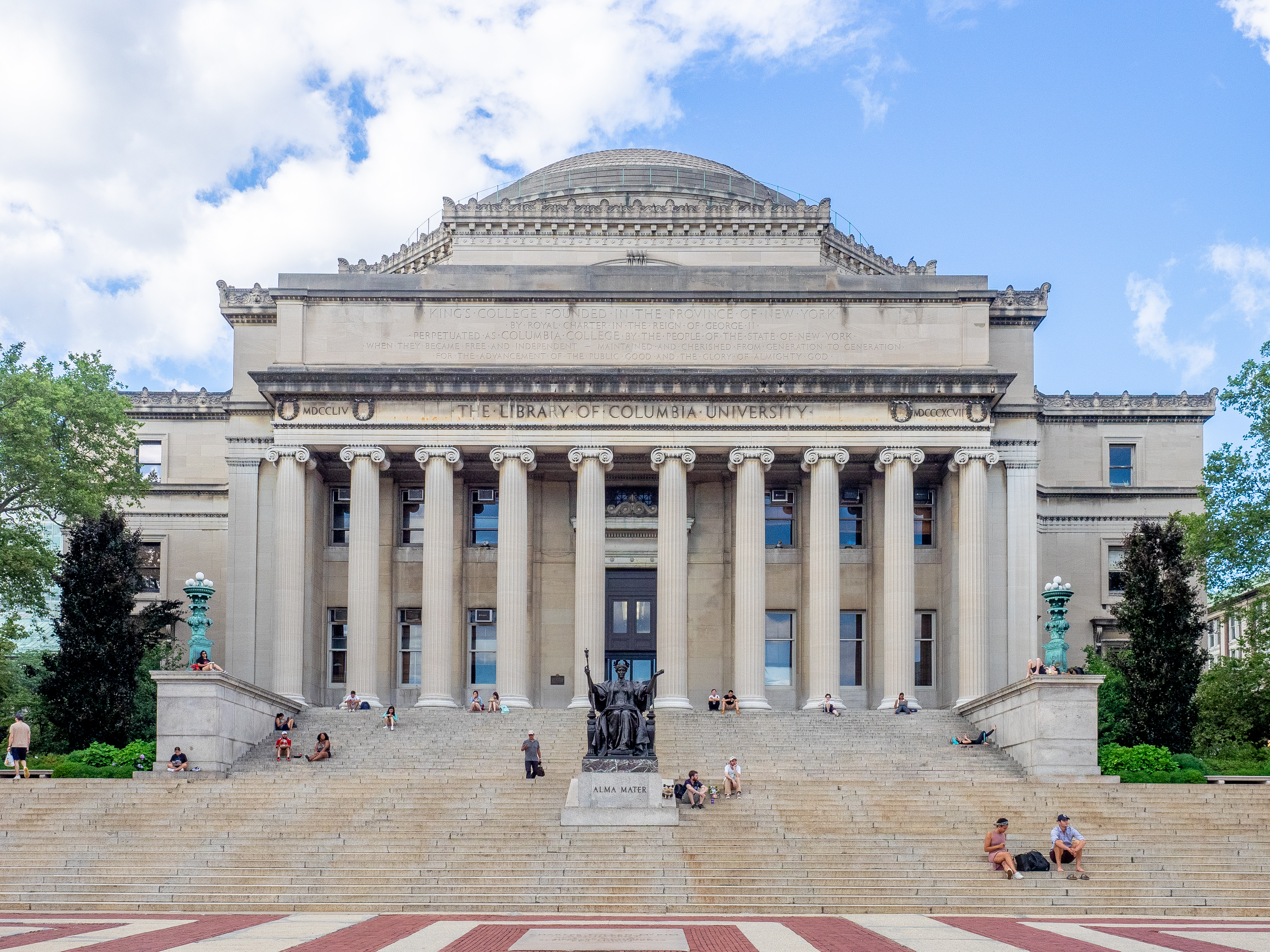
Low Memorial Library at Columbia University

Construction in the late 19th century was dominated by the emergence of Beaux-Arts architecture. Many of the new campuses designed during this period were built in the style, which was ornate, and inspired by classical architecture. One of the best known examples of a Beaux-Arts campus is that of Columbia University, which in 1892 began the process of moving its campus—for the second time in its history—to a new location. The architecture firm McKim, Mead, and White designed many of the university's new buildings, including the Low Library. This shift away from previous styles reflected changes and trends in city planning, as demonstrated by the Burnham Plan of Chicago.

Not all colleges designed their buildings in keeping with the Beaux Arts aesthetic. While many built in the elaborate style, others deliberately resisted the urge to build such expensive campuses. Johns Hopkins University, for example, chose pragmatism over conformation. The university built in order to blend in with the surrounding city. This choice, to build in a simple, vernacular style, was due both to financial constraints and due to the university's focus on graduate study, rather than traditional undergraduate curricula, a focus it drew from the German schooling model.

== 20th century campuses ==
=== World War II ===
The Great Depression stymied construction on many campuses, including Harvard's. Subsequently, World War II caused difficulty for many colleges, although immediately after the war there was a large increase in the number of students attending college due to the G.I. Bill. The bill featured the provision of tuition to returning soldiers. This led to a boom in construction on campuses across the country, despite uncertainty about whether or not the increased population would be sustained after the post-war frenzy.

=== Modernism on campuses ===
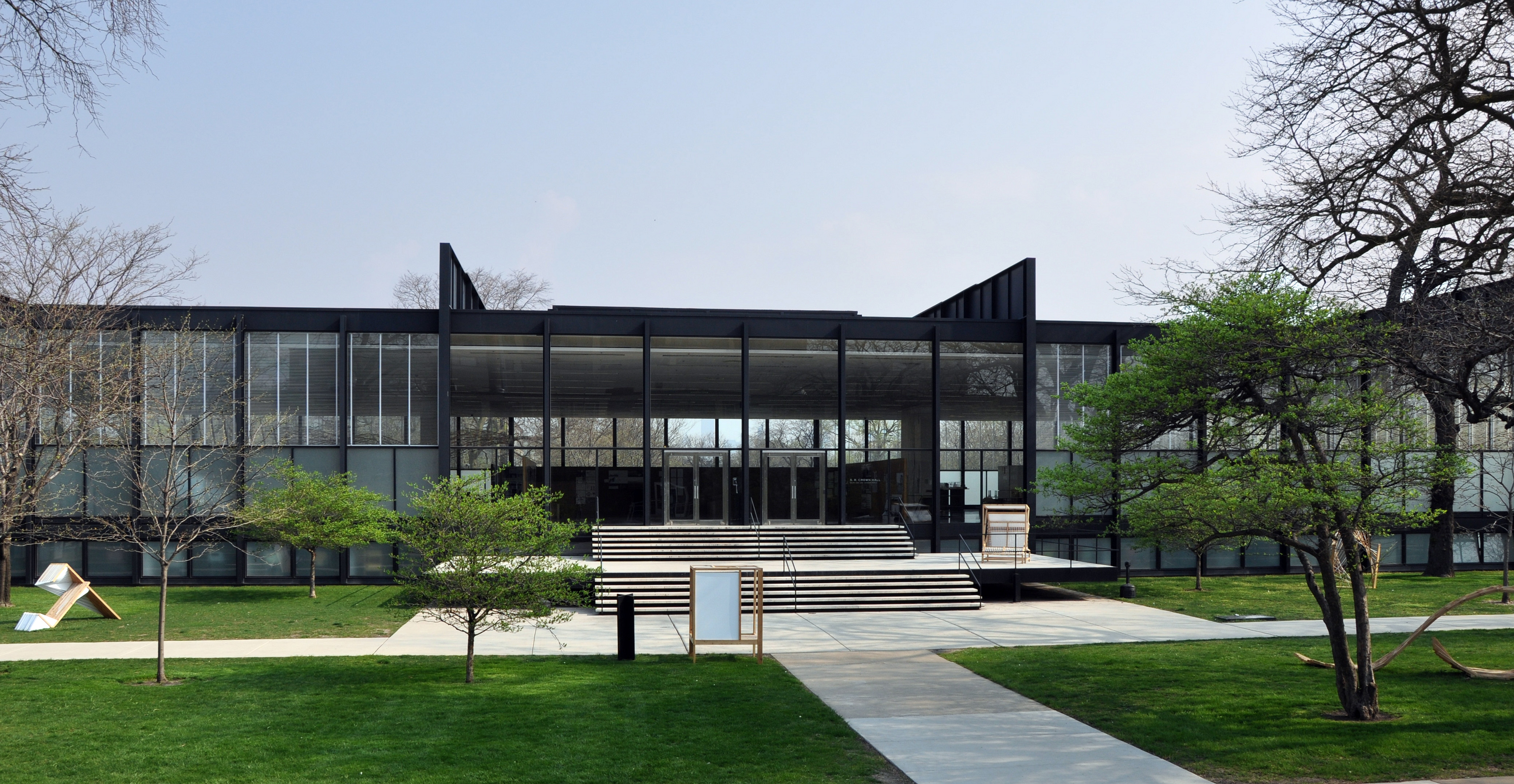
Entrance to S. R. Crown Hall

Modernist architecture was initially controversial in the United States, as it represented a stark stylistic departure from older collegiate styles. Hunter College was one of the first campuses to incorporate Modernist design, a decision for which it received praise. Debate over the relative merit of Modern architecture over past forms included sparring between Walter Gropius, a premier Modernist, and Walter Creese in the editorial section of the New York Times. Gropius was later employed by Harvard, and designed several buildings for the school.

Later, Illinois Institute of Technology built its entire campus in Modernist style, giving Mies van der Rohe free rein to employ and showcase Modernist techniques, perhaps best exemplified in S. R. Crown Hall, built from 1950 to 1958. Other campuses primarily Modernist in style include Florida Southern College, the sole campus designed by Frank Lloyd Wright, and the campus of the now defunct Black Mountain College.

== Contemporary architecture ==
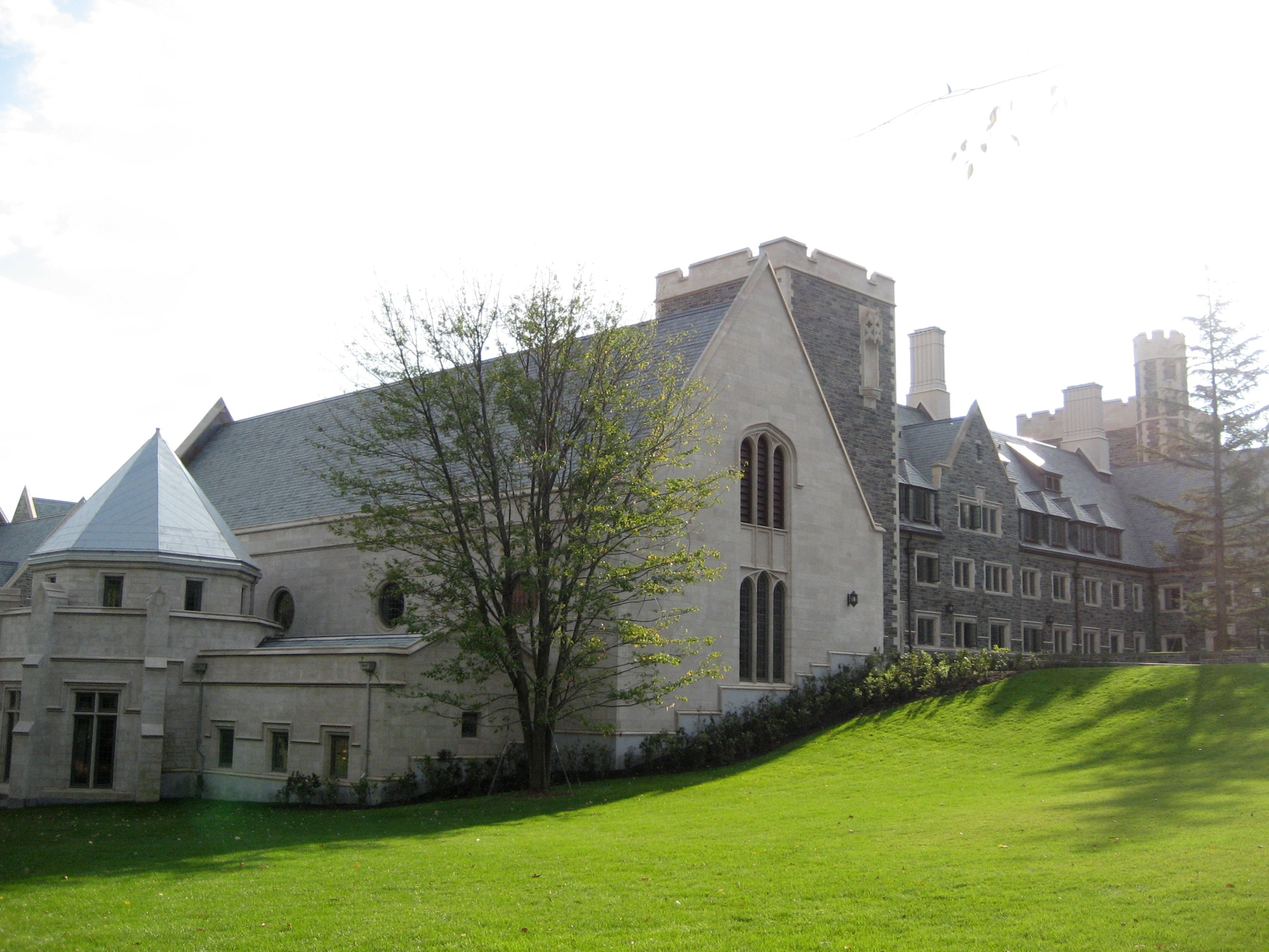
Whitman College at Princeton University

Contemporary construction on college campuses is diverse, with construction mirroring and diverging from earlier styles and trends. Examples of deliberately referential or contextual architecture include Whitman College, at Princeton. Designed by Demetri Porphyrios, the college was built to resemble earlier construction on the campus in the Collegiate Gothic style, examples of which include Mathey and Rockefeller Colleges. This construction is at odds with other recently added buildings, such as the Lewis Science Library, by architect Frank Gehry, which is Deconstructivist in its design, and neighboring Butler College, partially drafted by postmodern architect Robert Venturi.

Some institutions, such as Rhodes College and Franklin and Marshall, have resisted change, preferring to construct in the same styles originally employed on their campuses. This has led to continuous Collegiate Gothic construction at Rhodes. At Franklin and Marshall, this has meant Georgian and Colonial Revival buildings in the style of Charles Klauder designed by architects such as Robert A. M. Stern and the firm of Einhorn Yaffee Prescott. These decisions have sometimes been controversial. Princeton and Yale have respectively received criticism due to the expense, perceived difficulty of use by students, and apparently reactionary motivations associated with construction of new residential colleges in traditional styles on their campuses.

Other schools, such as the Massachusetts Institute of Technology and the University of Cincinnati have embraced experimental or contemporary architecture. The MIT campus features work from Modernists such as Eero Saarinen and I.M. Pei, as well as contemporary buildings by architects such as Steven Holl. Similarly, Cincinnati's campus features the work of many Modernists, and contemporary architects, such as Frank Gehry, Machado and Silvetti, and Michael Graves, an iconic postmodern architect.

=== Future of the campus ===
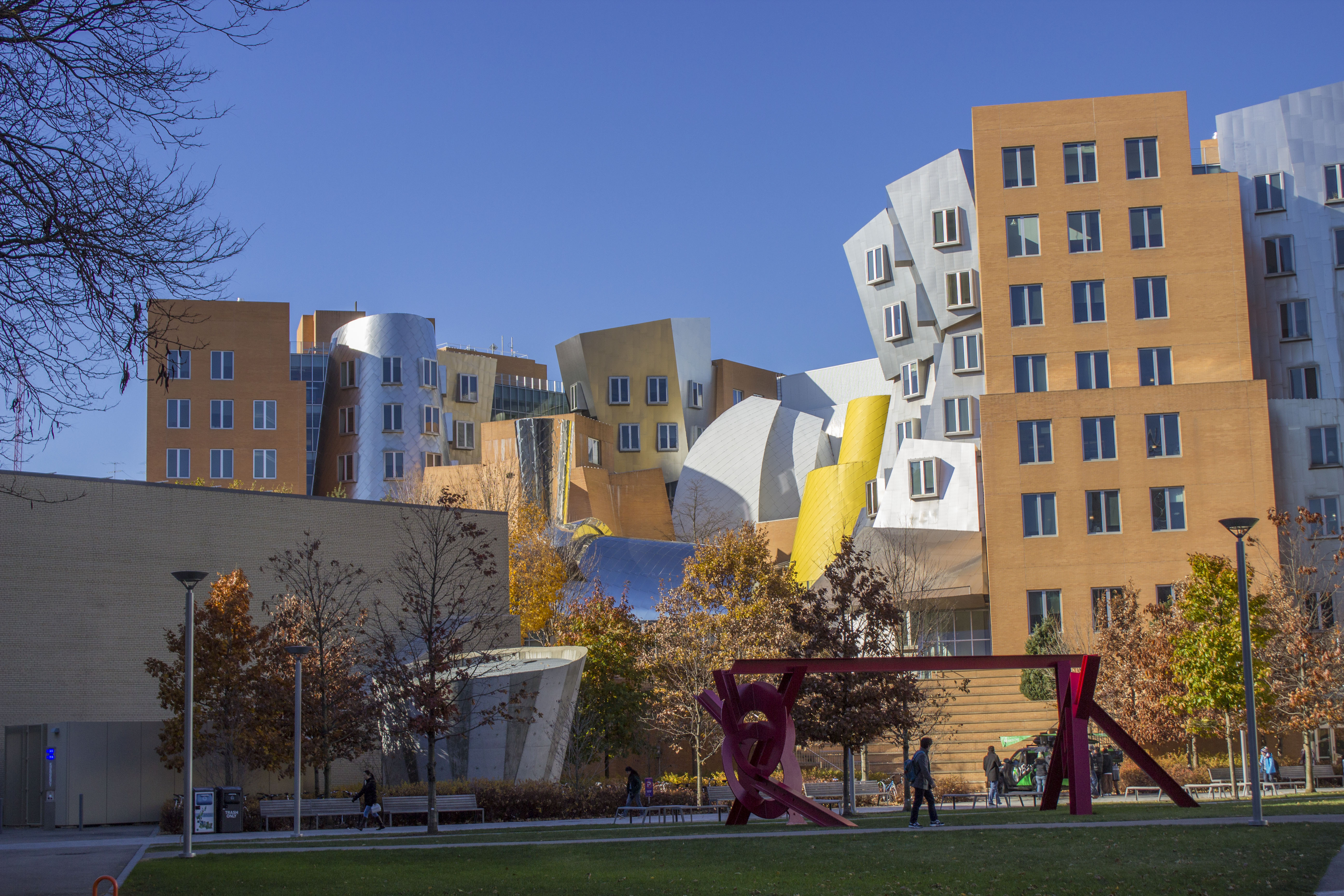
The postmodern Stata Center at the Massachusetts Institute of Technology, opened in 2004

With the advent of online colleges, such as the University of Phoenix and Kaplan University, the increasing cost of tuition, and alternatives to the traditional campus-based models of education, some anticipate changes to the way students interact with colleges and receive degrees. These changes may include reduced numbers of students on traditional college campuses, and a reduced role for the residential aspect of four year colleges.

== See also ==
- History of higher education in the United States
