= The Communal Experience =

- First edition
- Author: Laurence Veysey
- Subject: American counterculture, American history
- Published: 1973 (Harper & Row)
- Pages: 495
- ISBN: 0-060-14501-3

The Communal Experience: Anarchist and Mystical Counter-Cultures in America is a book-length historical and sociological study of cultural radicalism in the United States, written by historian Laurence Veysey and published in 1973 by Harper & Row.
