= Laurence Veysey =

American historian

Laurence Russ Veysey (1932–2004) was a historian best known for his history of higher education, The Emergence of the American University. He also wrote The Communal Experience.
