= Azazeta =

Coordinates: 42°47′N 2°30′W

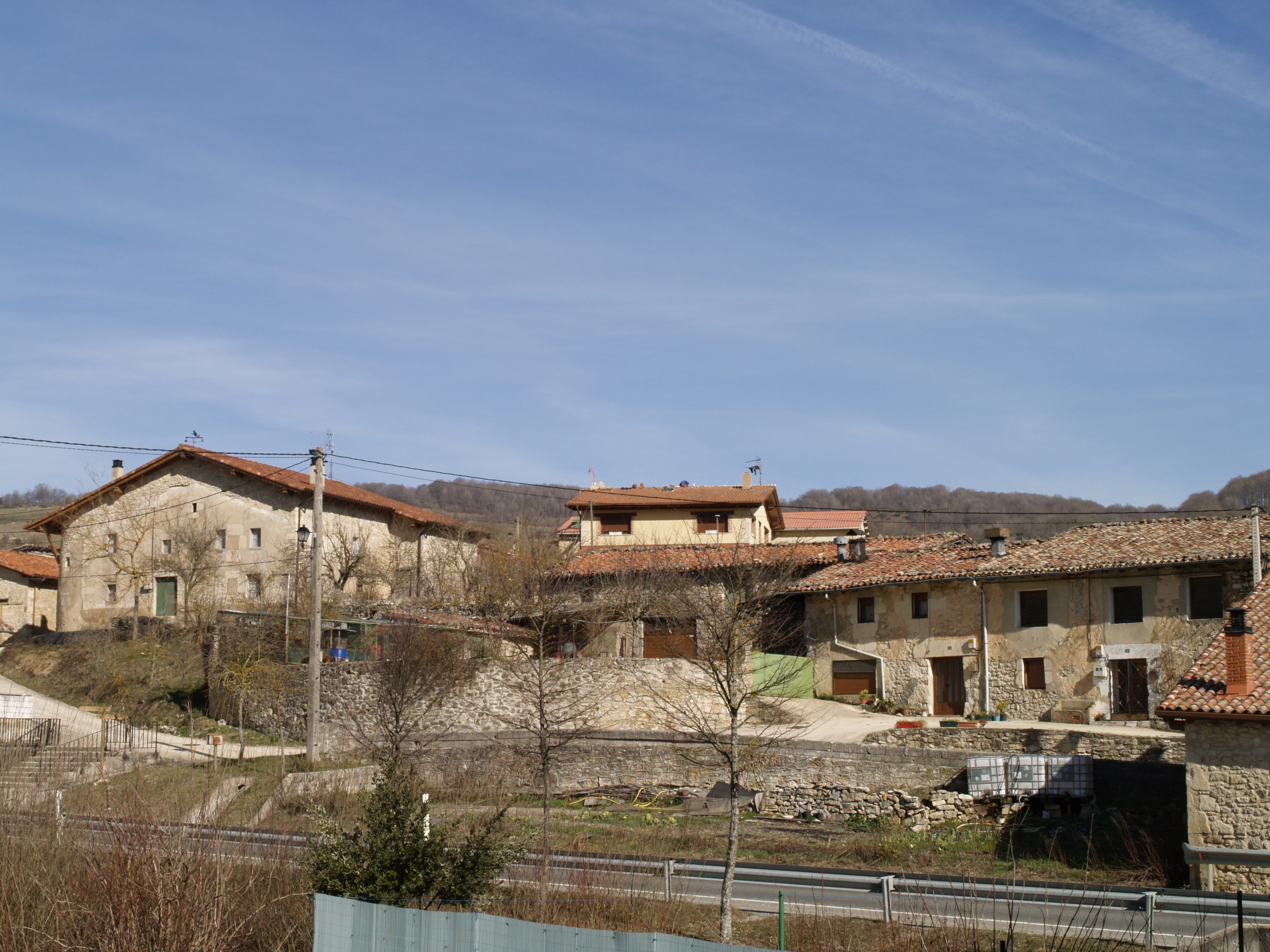

Azazeta (in Spanish Azáceta) is a village in Álava, Basque Country, Spain. The village belongs to the municipality of Arraya-Maestu. The extensive municipality of Arraia-Maeztu belongs to the Álava mountain range. Formed by several valleys around the Berrón (Arraia Valley) and Musitu (Laminoria Valley) streams, this large town is surrounded by the Iturrieta and Vitoria-Gasteiz mountains. Azaceta is located in the Sierra de Guereñu, in a small plain surrounded by high mountains.

The weather is cold, but healthy. There are abundant water sources.

== Population ==
Currently the village comprises approximately thirty households, in which there are some sixty residents.

== History ==
Azazeta is the village that gave name to the mountain pass leading to the village. The village is situated on both sides of the road, in a clearing in the mountains, just after beginning the descent from the port towards Maestu.

It is a small but very well maintained town both in its main square and in its buildings which are adorned with a profusion of flowers. It consists of 30 family houses. In the plaza, which adjoins the road there is a fountain which flows in what is the former washing place. Opposite, across the road, is the Social Center, which is also used as a tavern or bar.

In the first decades of the twentieth century there was a school with up to 45 children enrolled. Currently the old school has been converted into a private home.

The village is currently inhabited by three families, although on feast days and weekends many people arrive to enjoy the pleasant climate in summer and surround themselves with tranquillity.

In the year 1025, documentation in San Millán de la Cogolla include the place name Azazaheta.

== Monuments ==
The church in Azazeta is dedicated to the Nativity of Our Lady, and retains many remnants of its original construction. Under its rustic porch in the shape of a large arch, there is a beautiful sixteenth century portal. The present eighteenth-century altarpiece includes various pieces from the sixteenth century, among which is the seated image of Mary.

It is rectangular, narrowing at the head and has gothic vaults and a masonry factory. The altar has a typical Baroque altarpiece. To the left is the altar dedicated to Our Lady of the Rosary. On the right, the altar of Santiago. Both altars are baroque. The porch has a round arch. The square tower was built in 1822 by Master Mason Vicente Nanclares.

== Celebrations ==
Patron feast day was previously celebrated on 16 April in honour of Saint Turibius. However, from 1939 celebrations on 25 July in honour of Saint James, patron saint of Spain, were honoured instead. The major feasts of Azaceta are celebrated during Santiago (Saint James), usually between the 24th and 26 July, during which they perform various types of activities: round parades, crafts and games for children, a grand chocolatada, bouncy castles, fellowship dinners and many more.

== Photo gallery ==
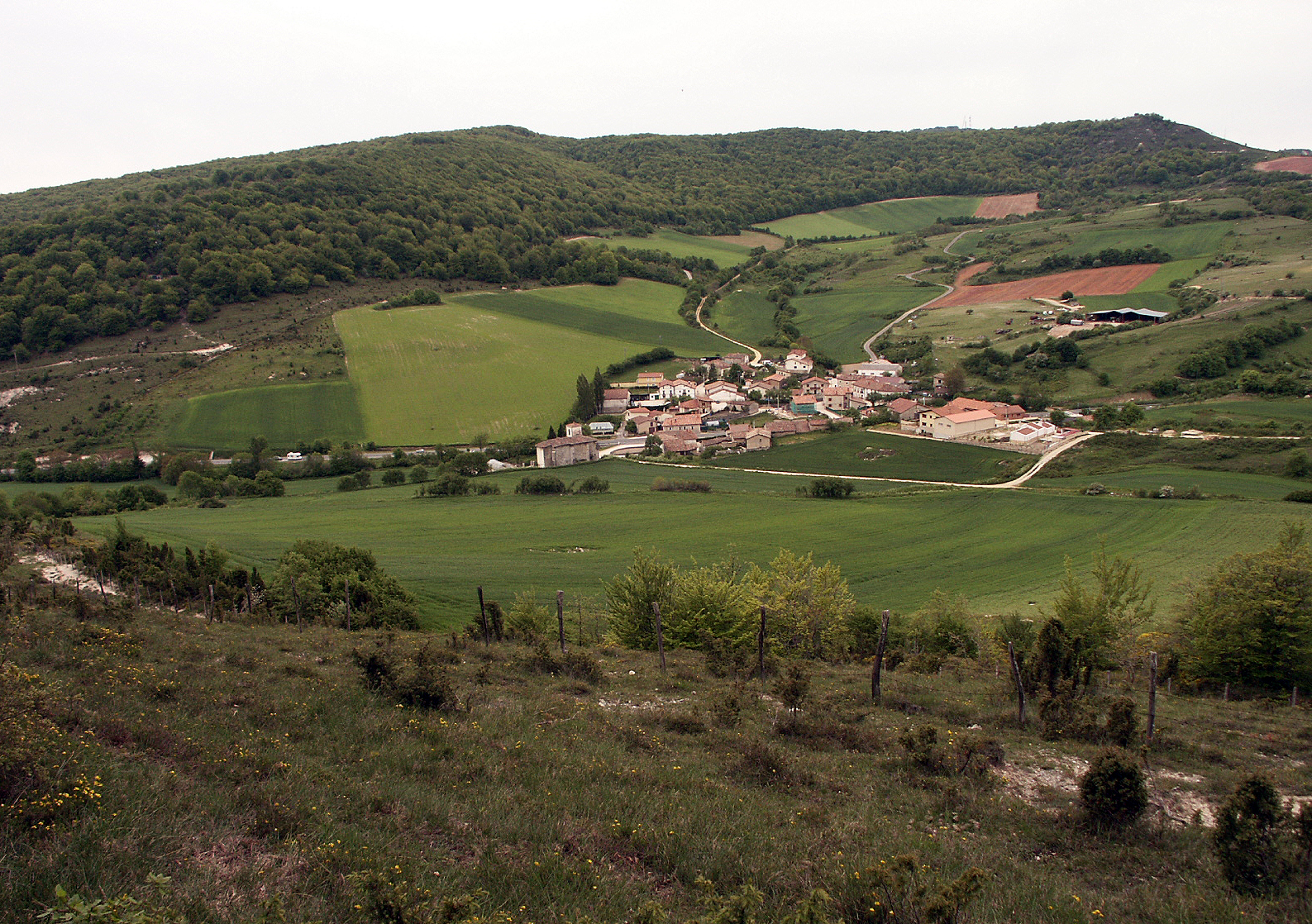
General view of the village of Azazeta

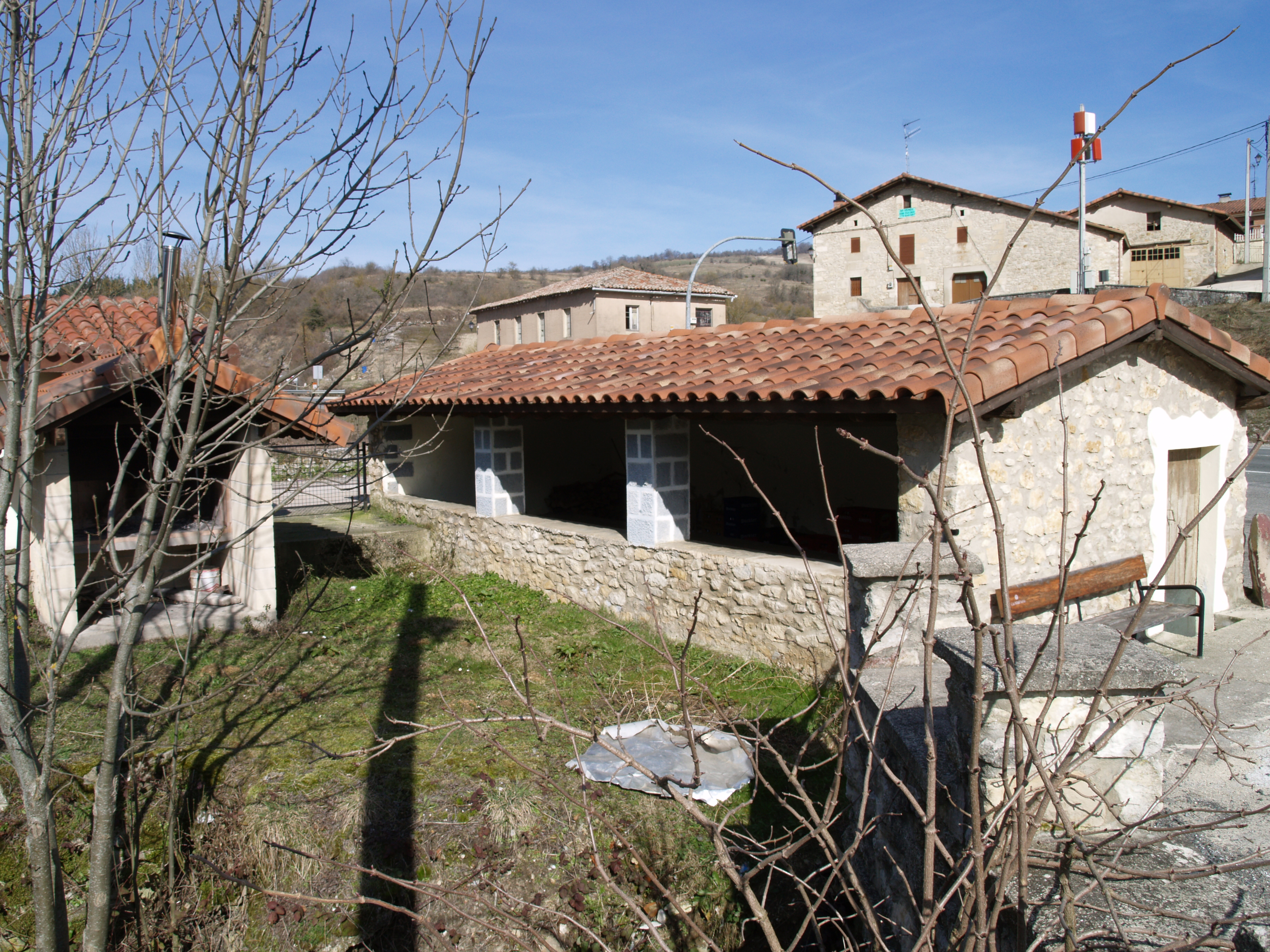
Old Azazeta wash-house

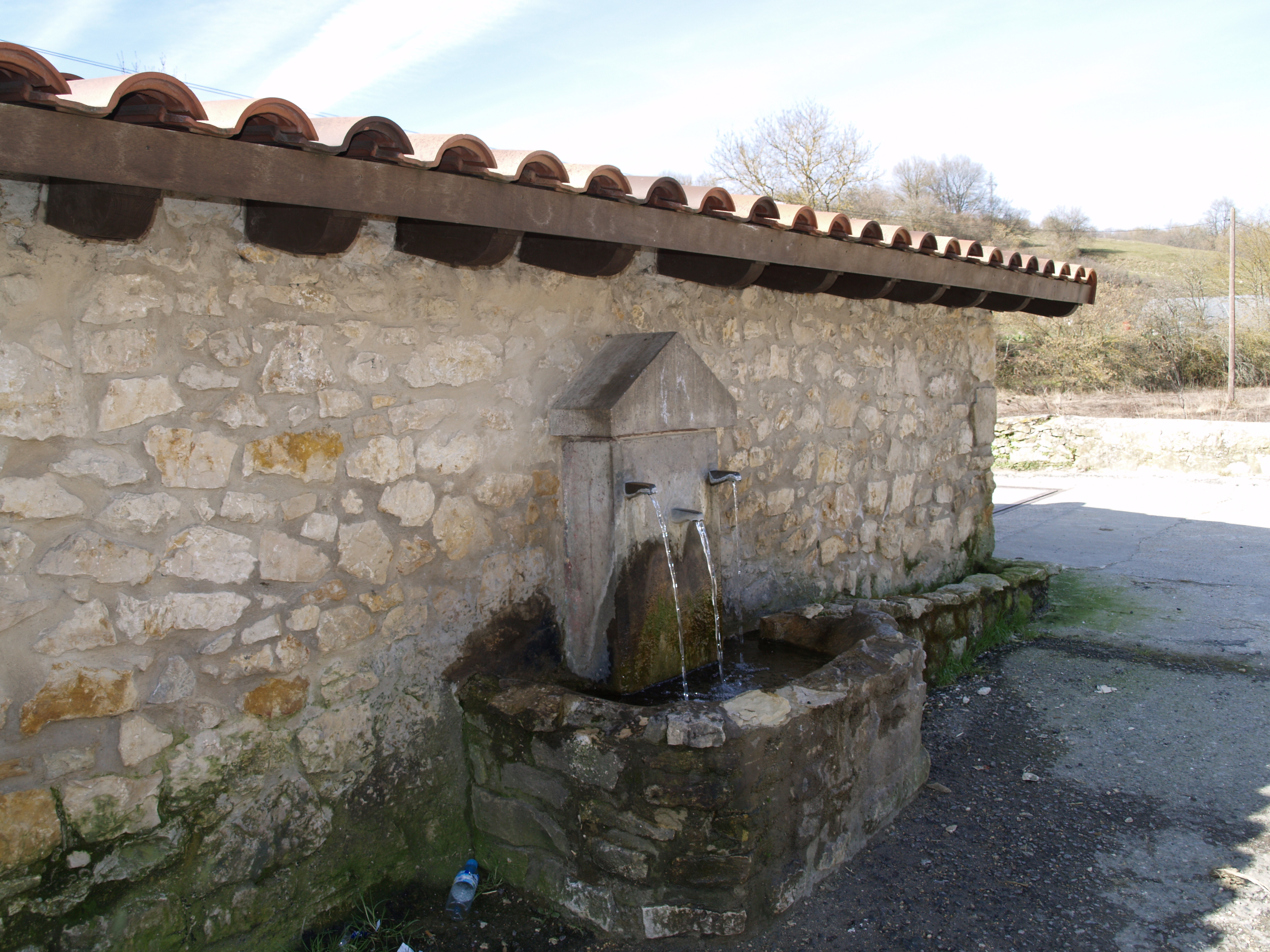
Azazeta waterhole

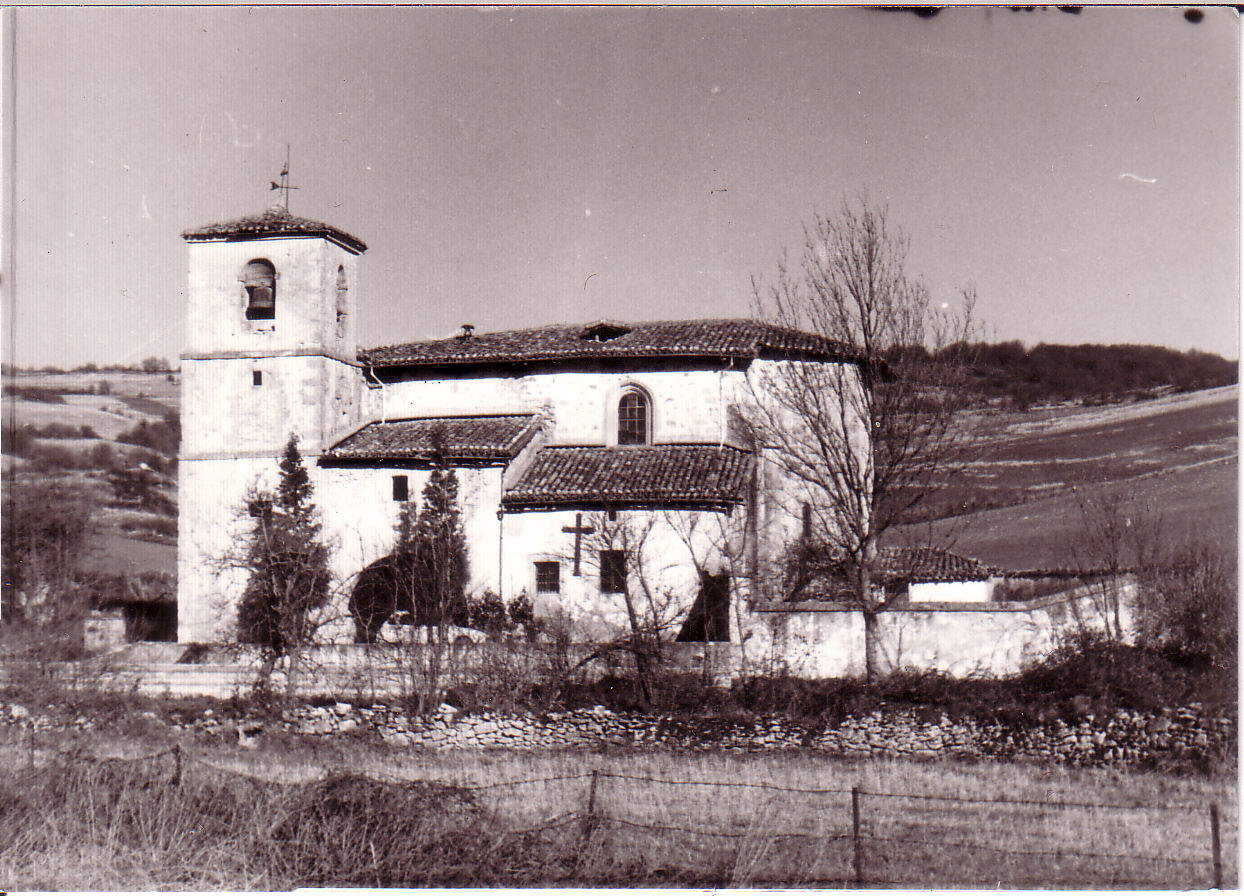
Azazeta church in 1969

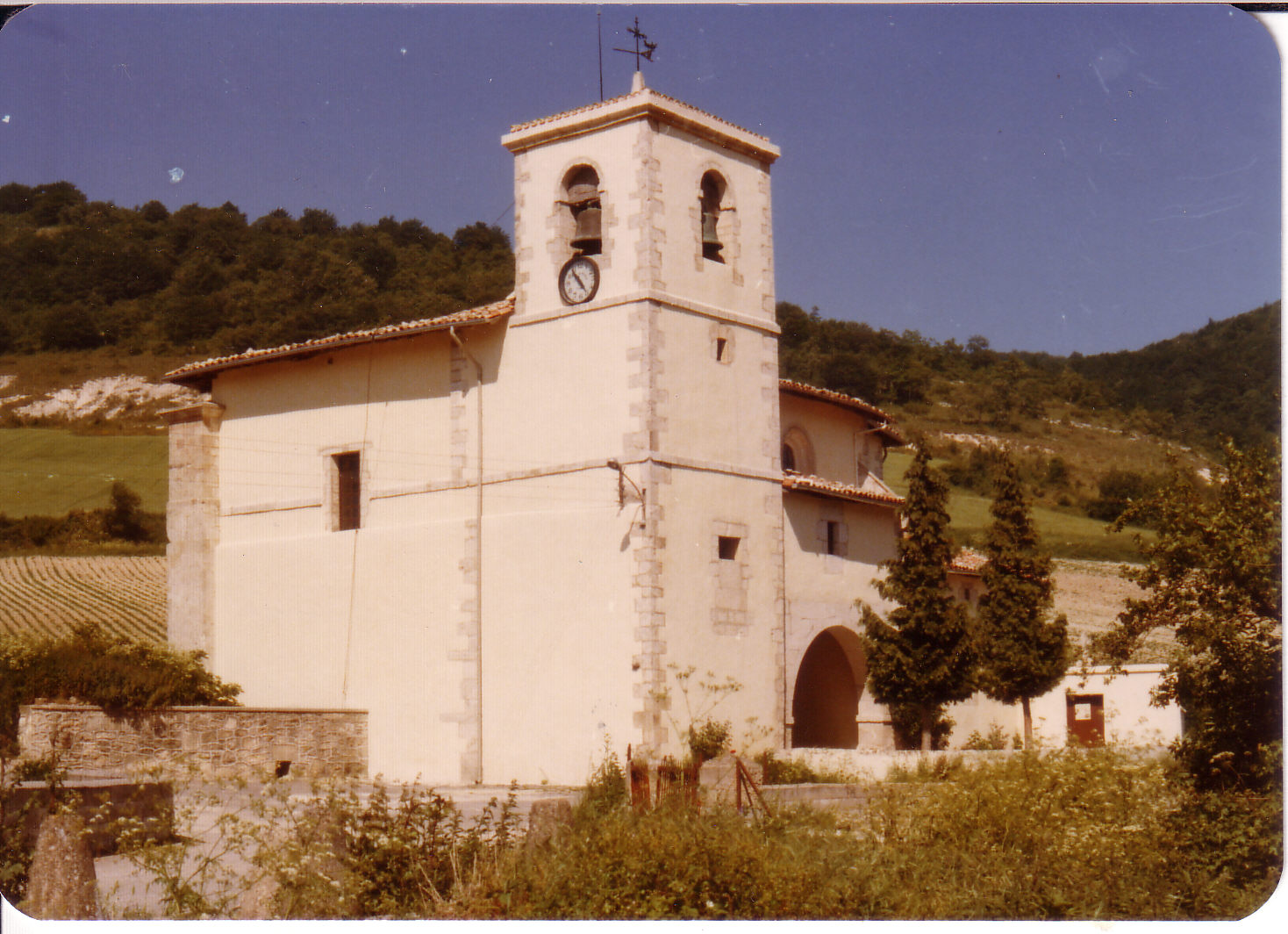
Azazeta church in 1974

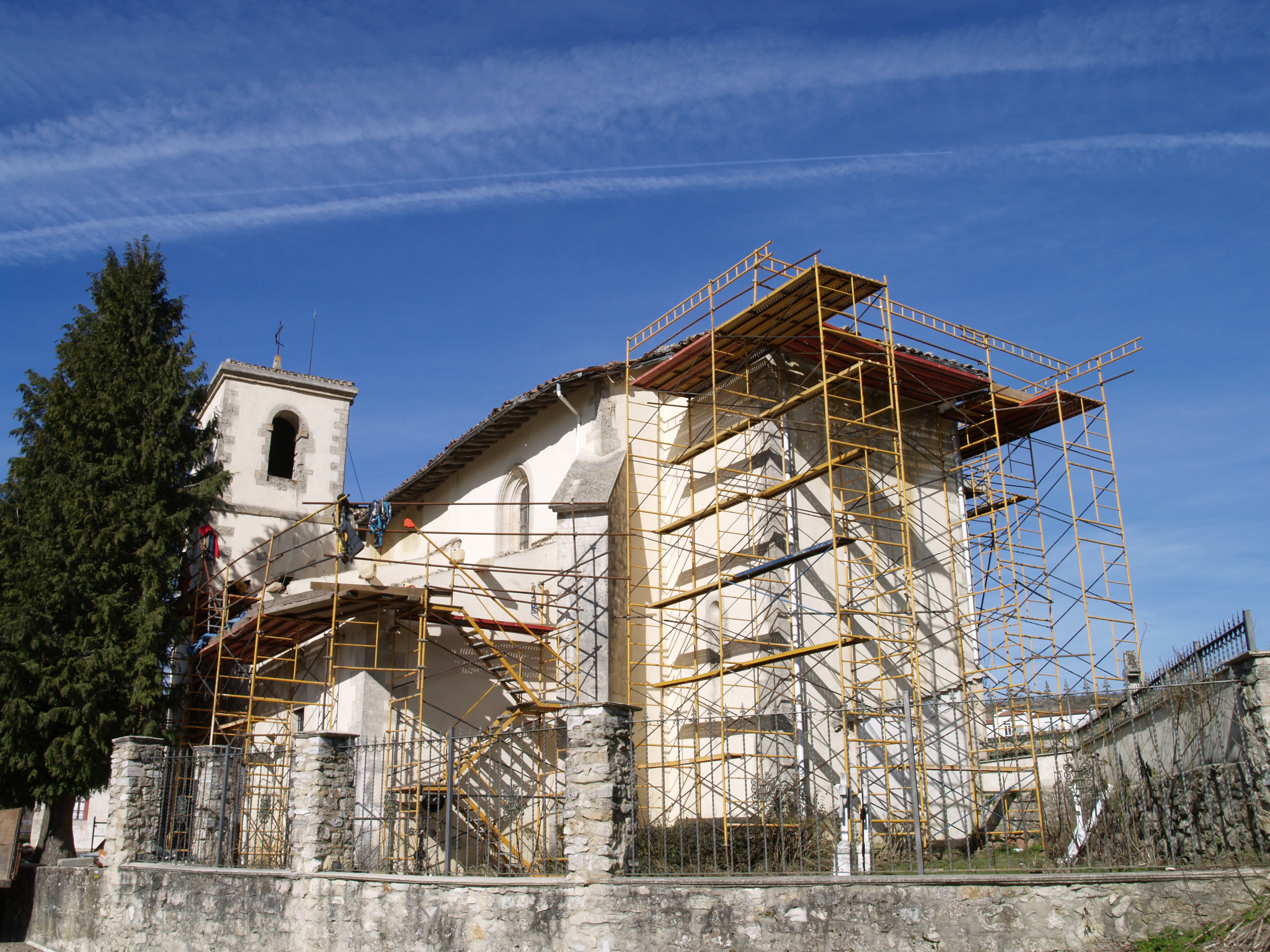
Restoration of the Church. February 2009.

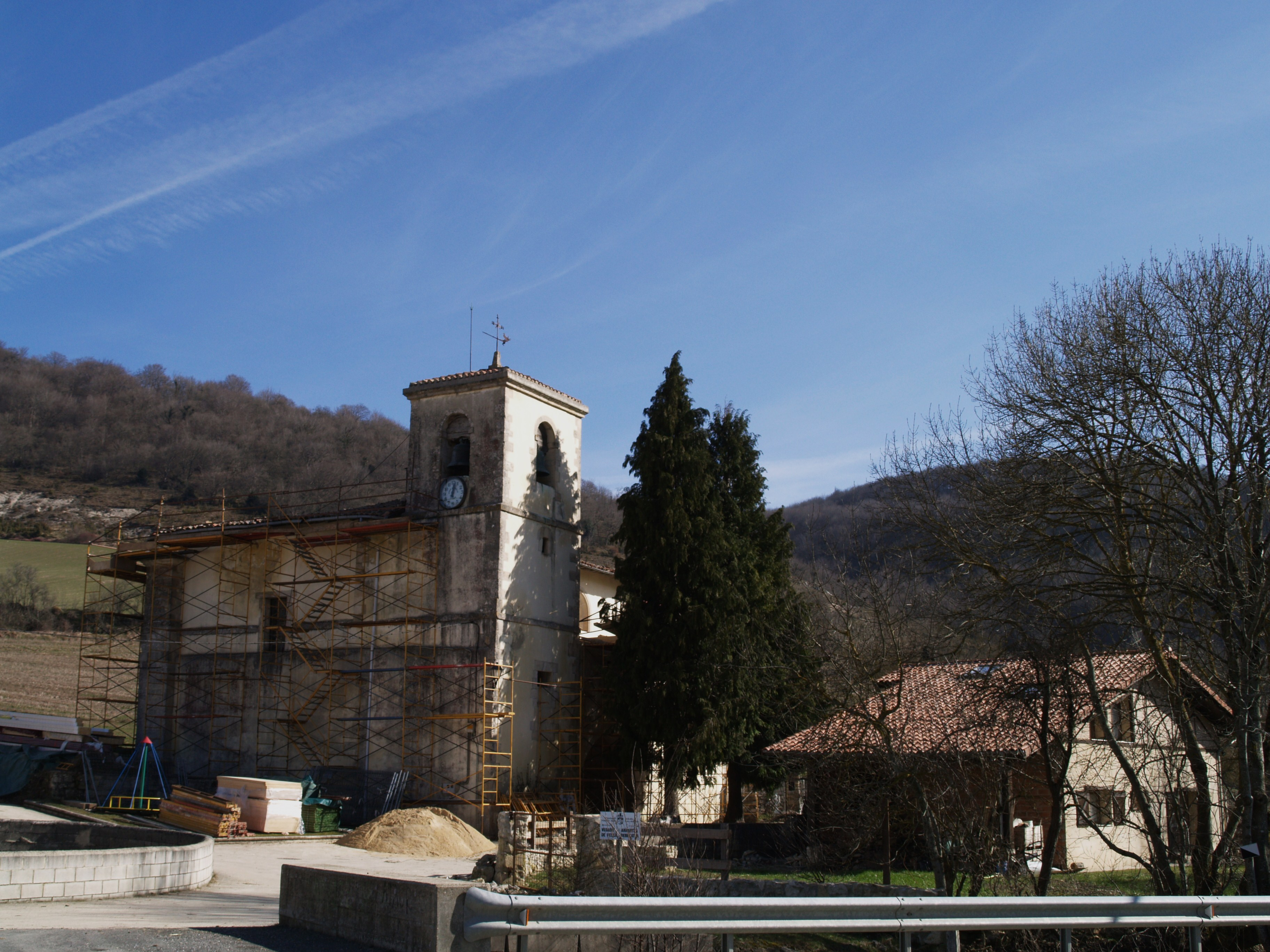
View of the Azazeta church

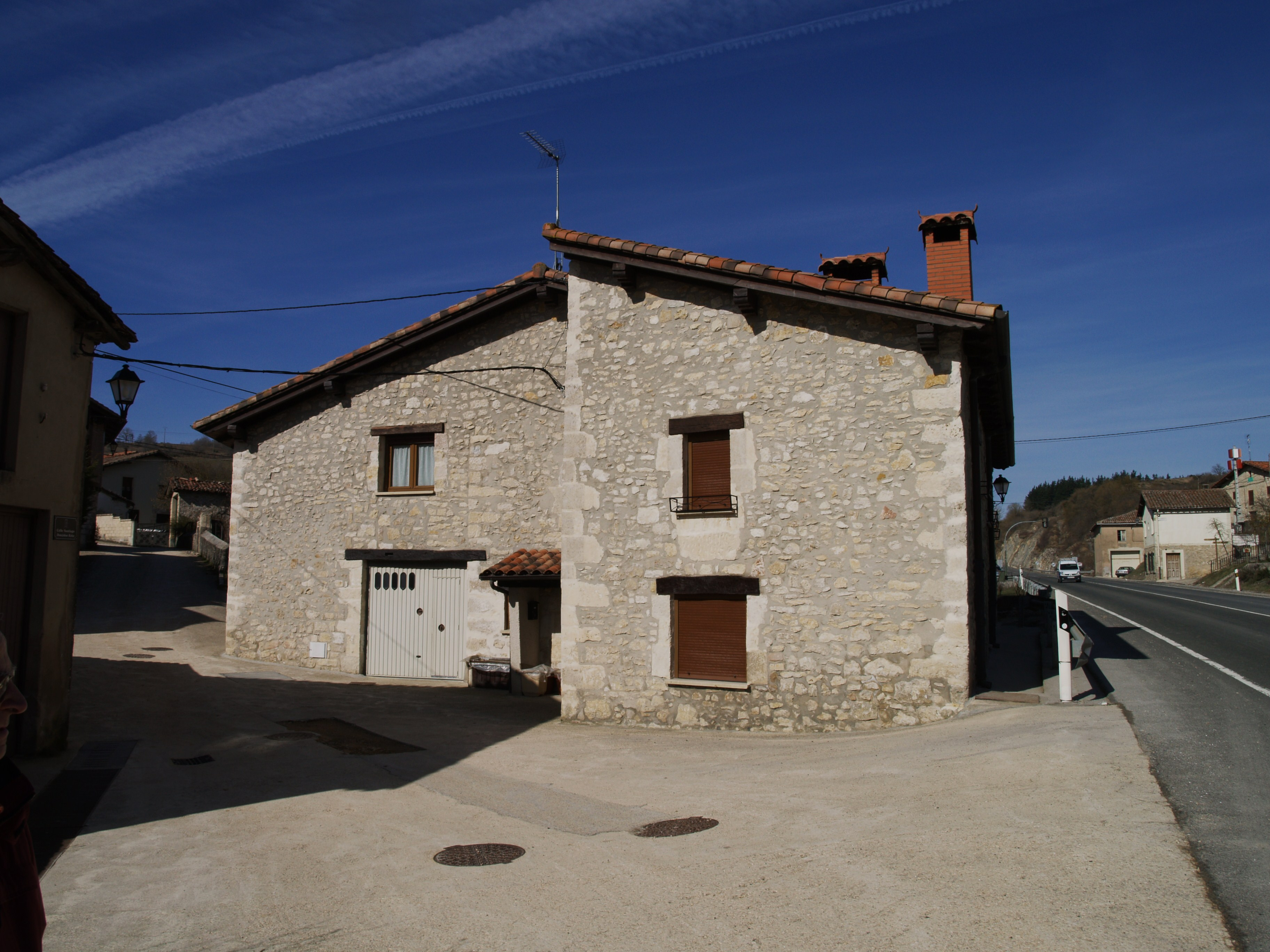
Al side of the provincial road

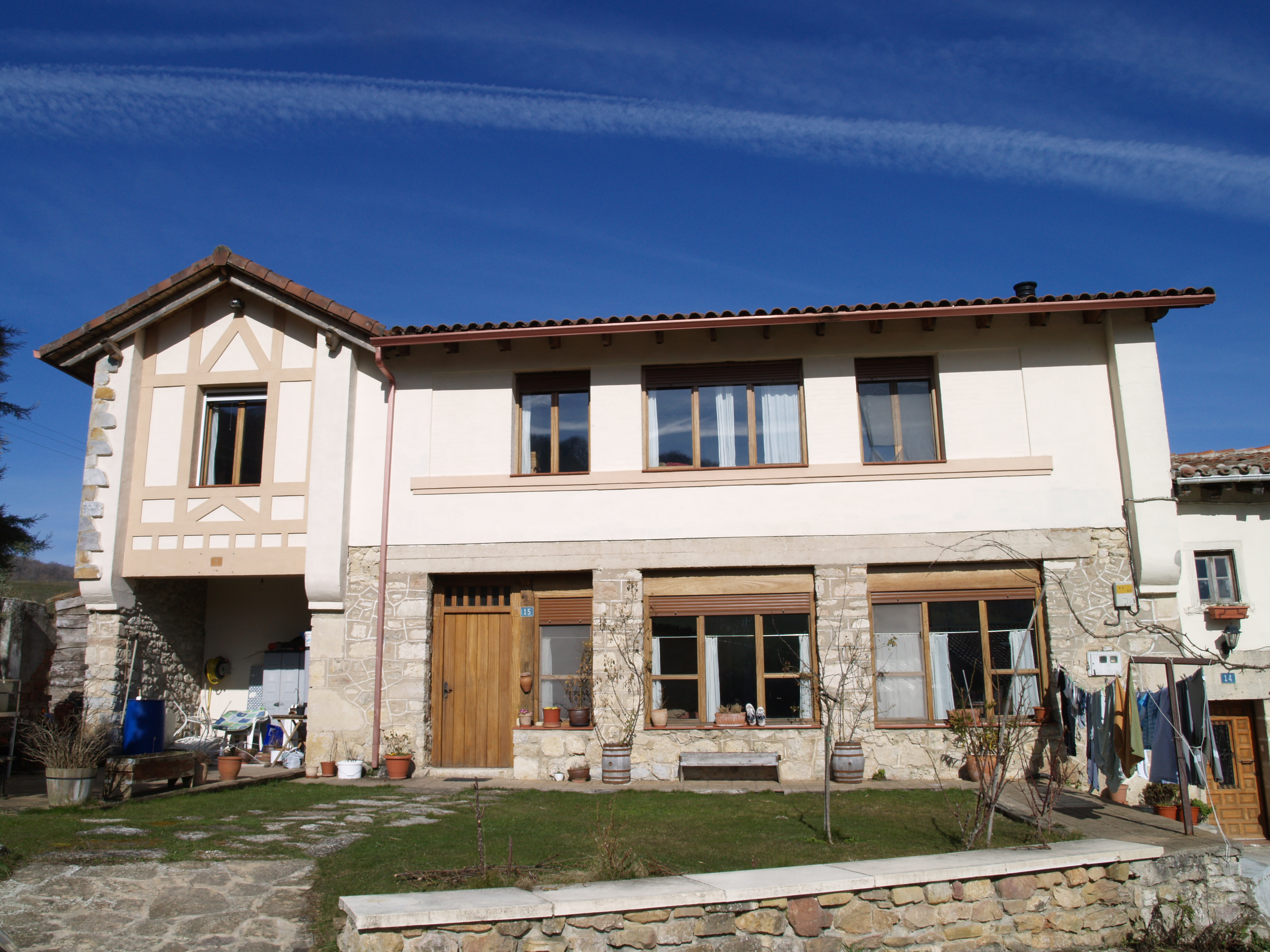
Former elementary school

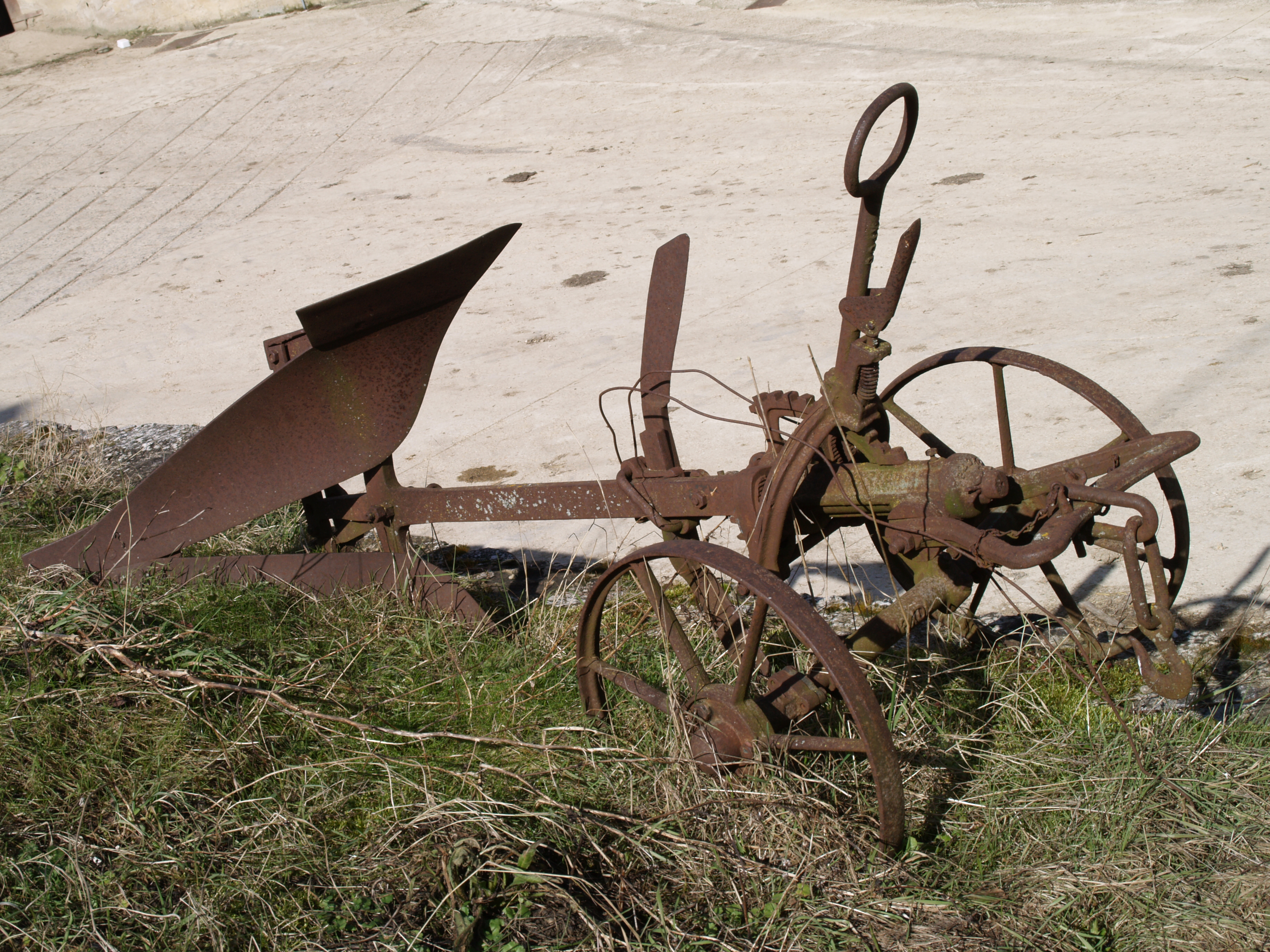
Plough from the previous century

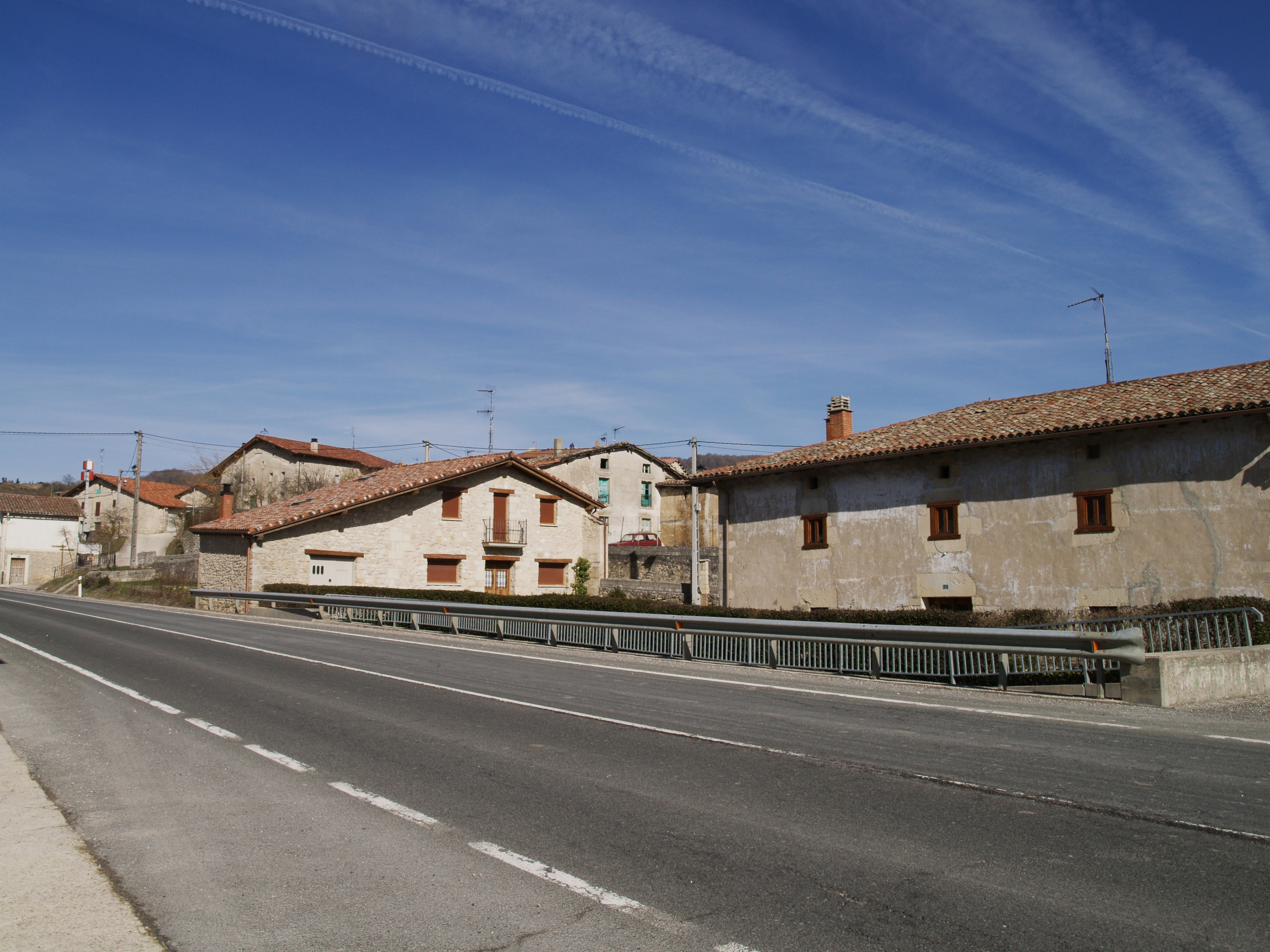
Centennial Road, major channel of communication

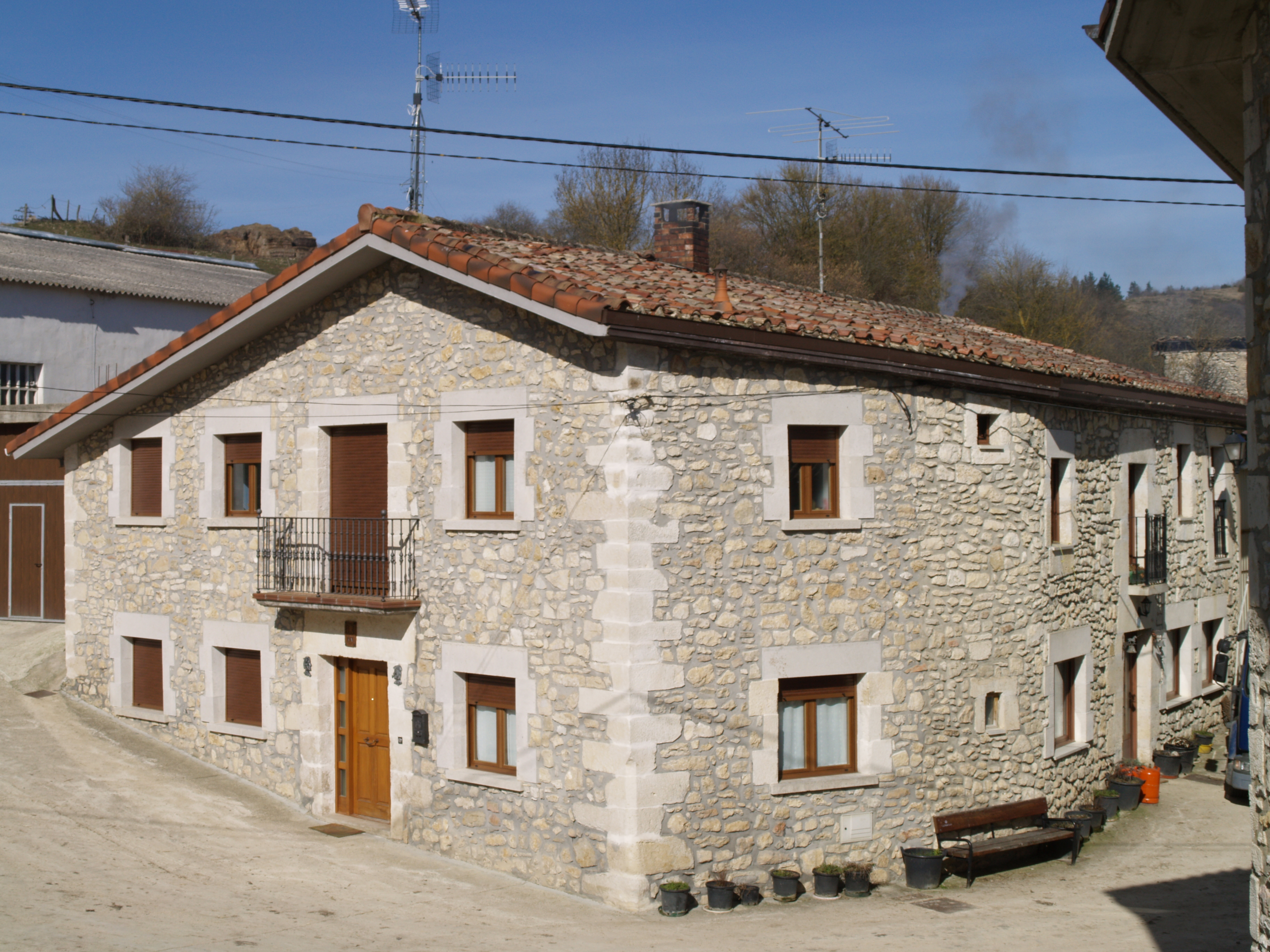
A lovely corner

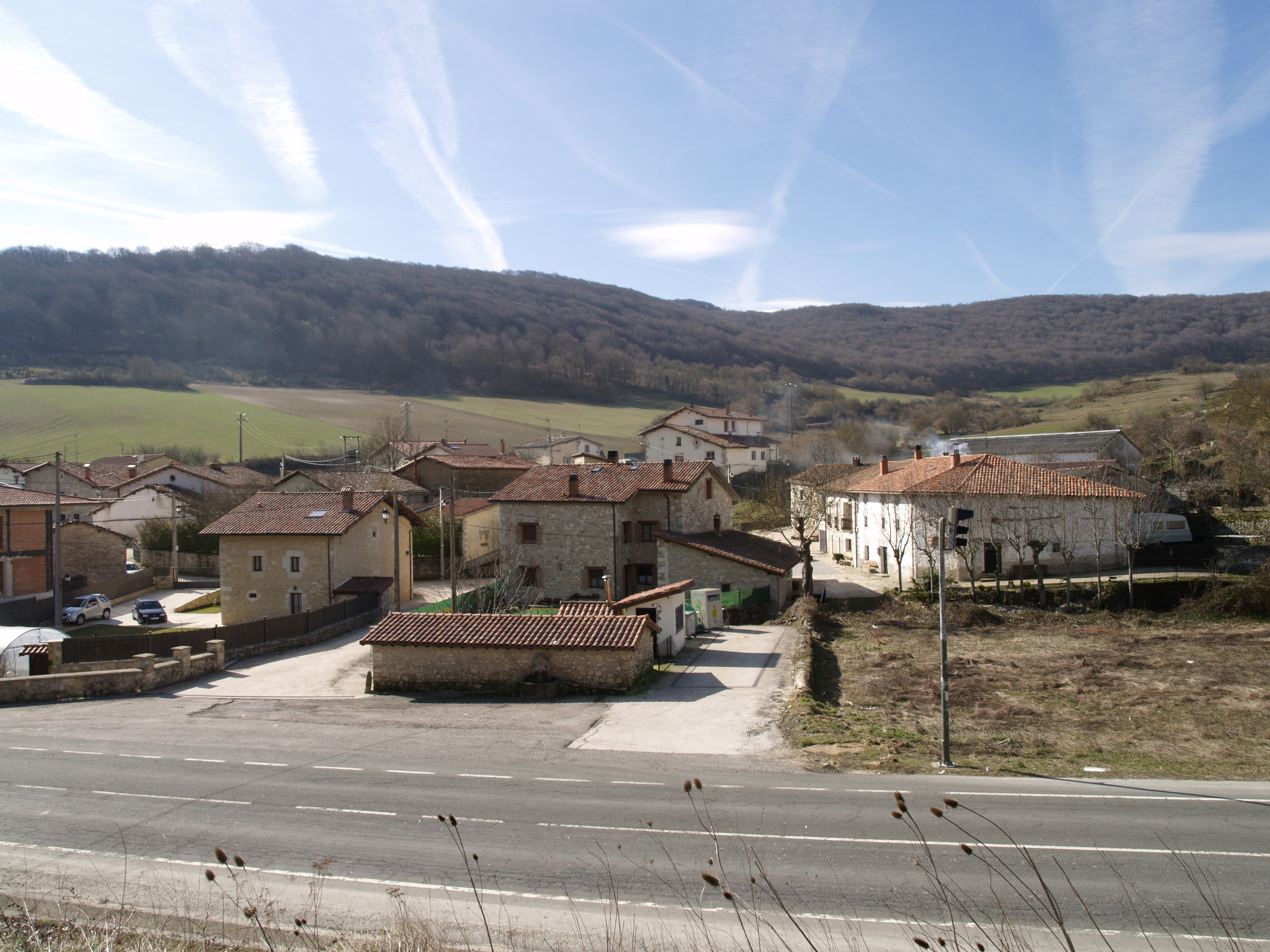
Road dividing the village

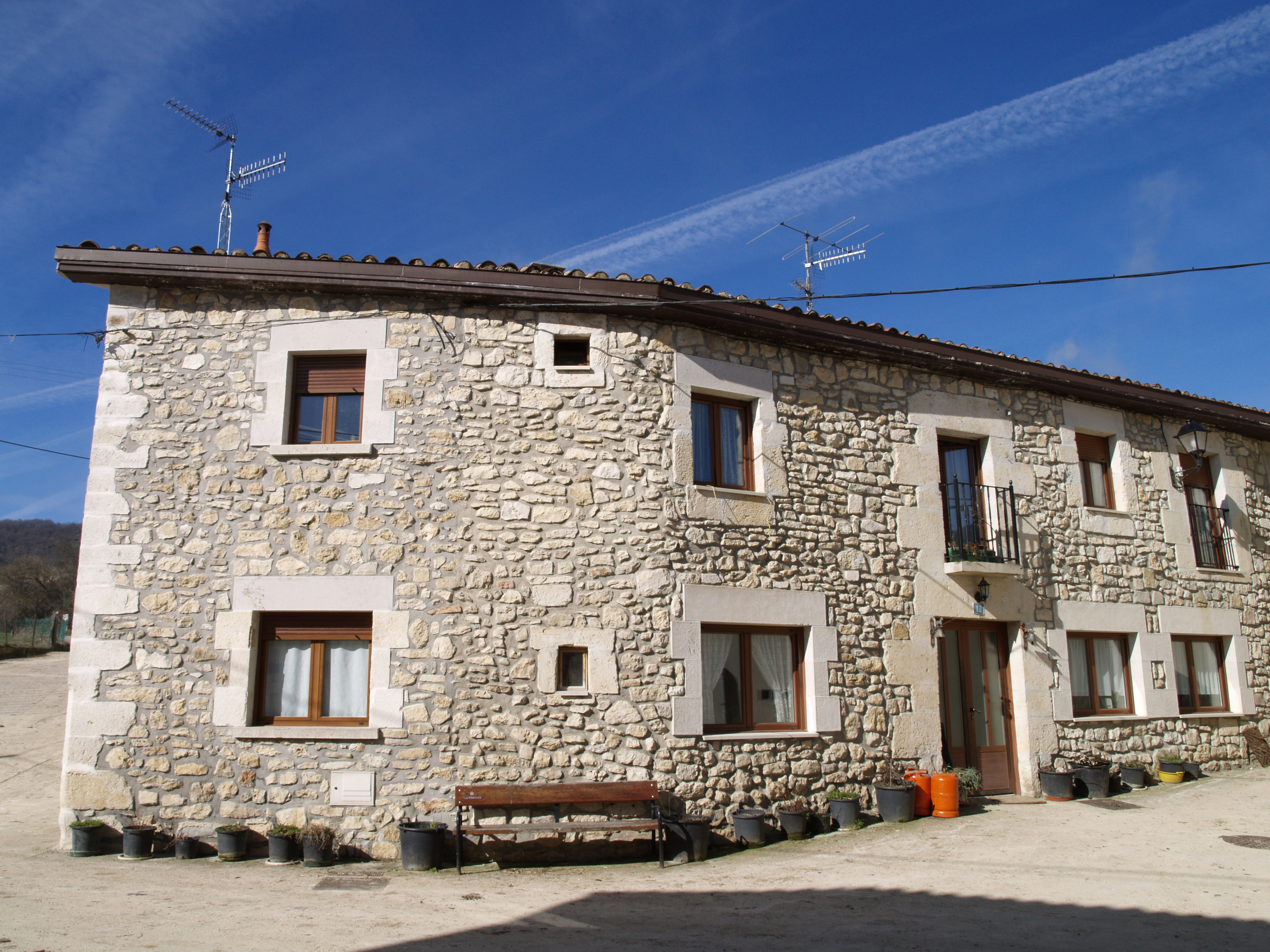
House on Ebro Street

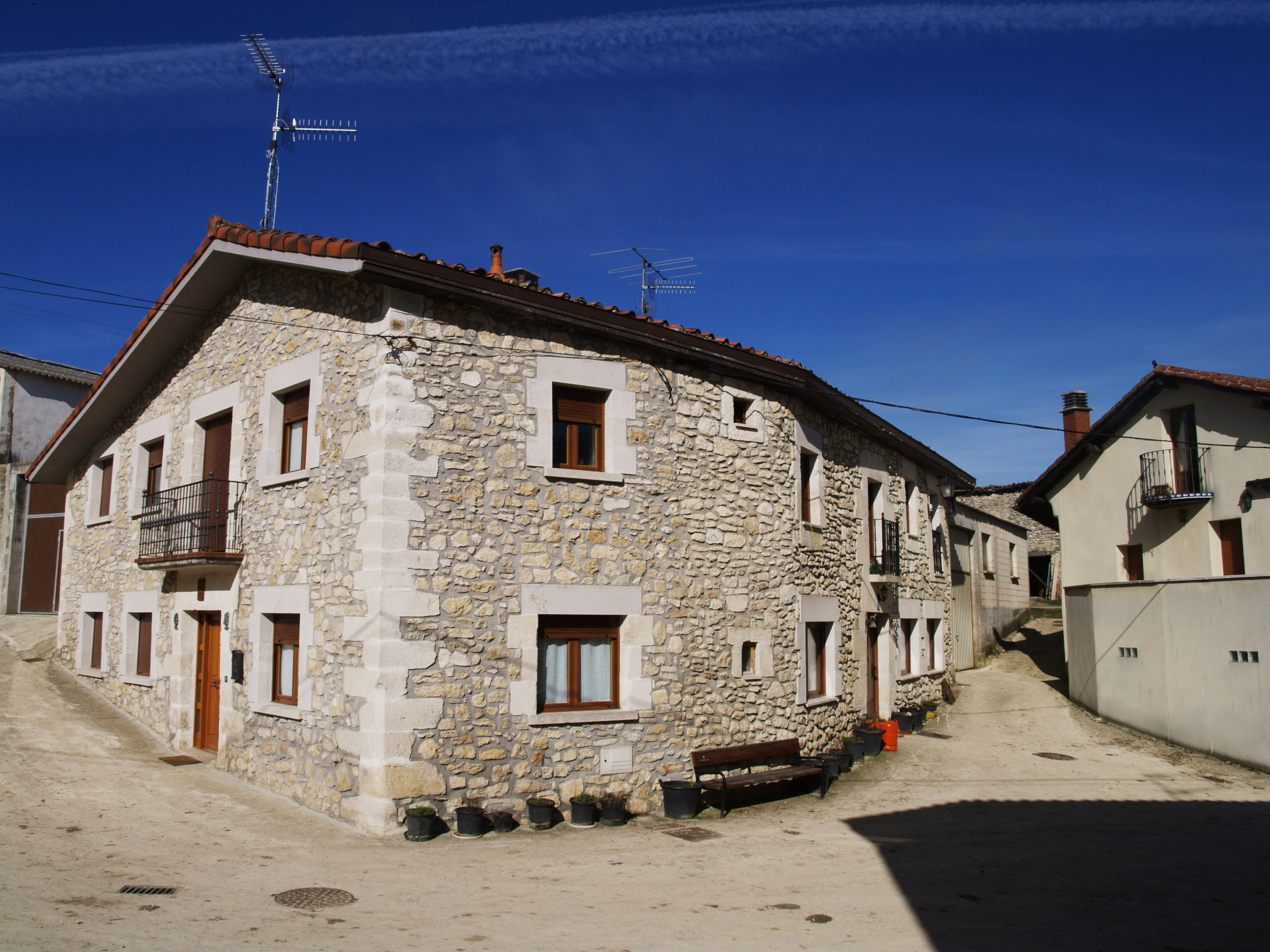
Native house of an Azazeta family

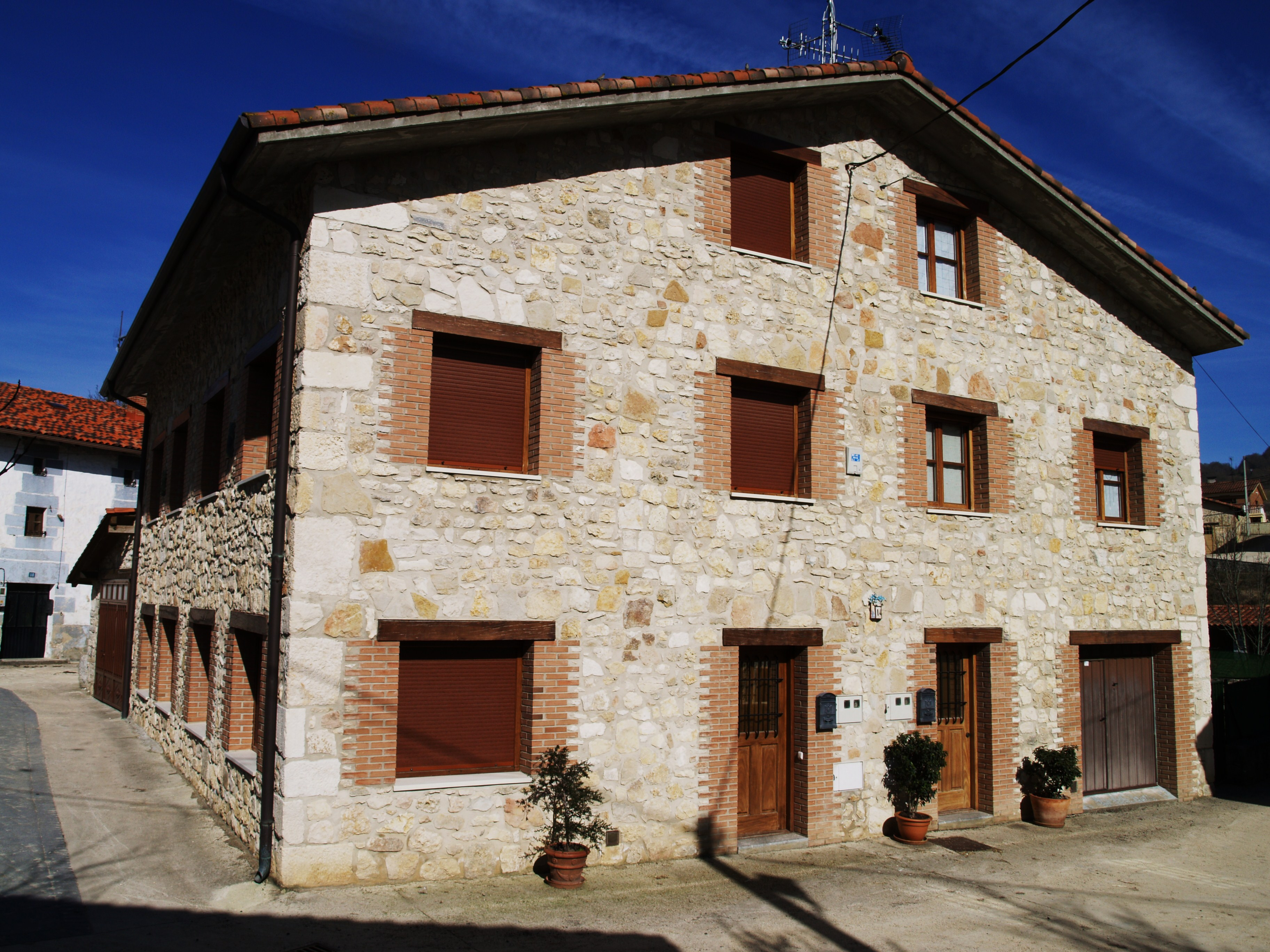
A Manor House

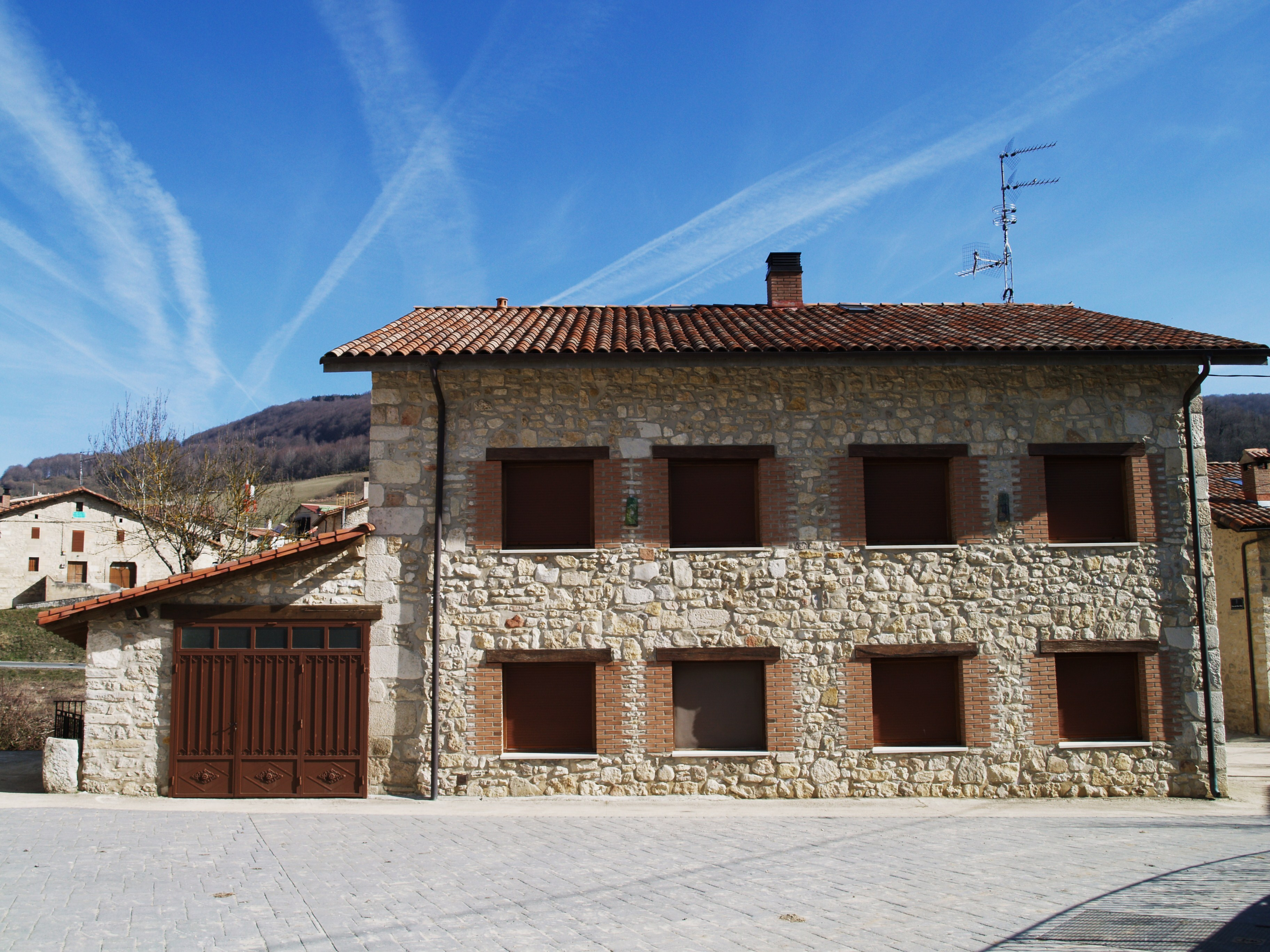
A typical restored house

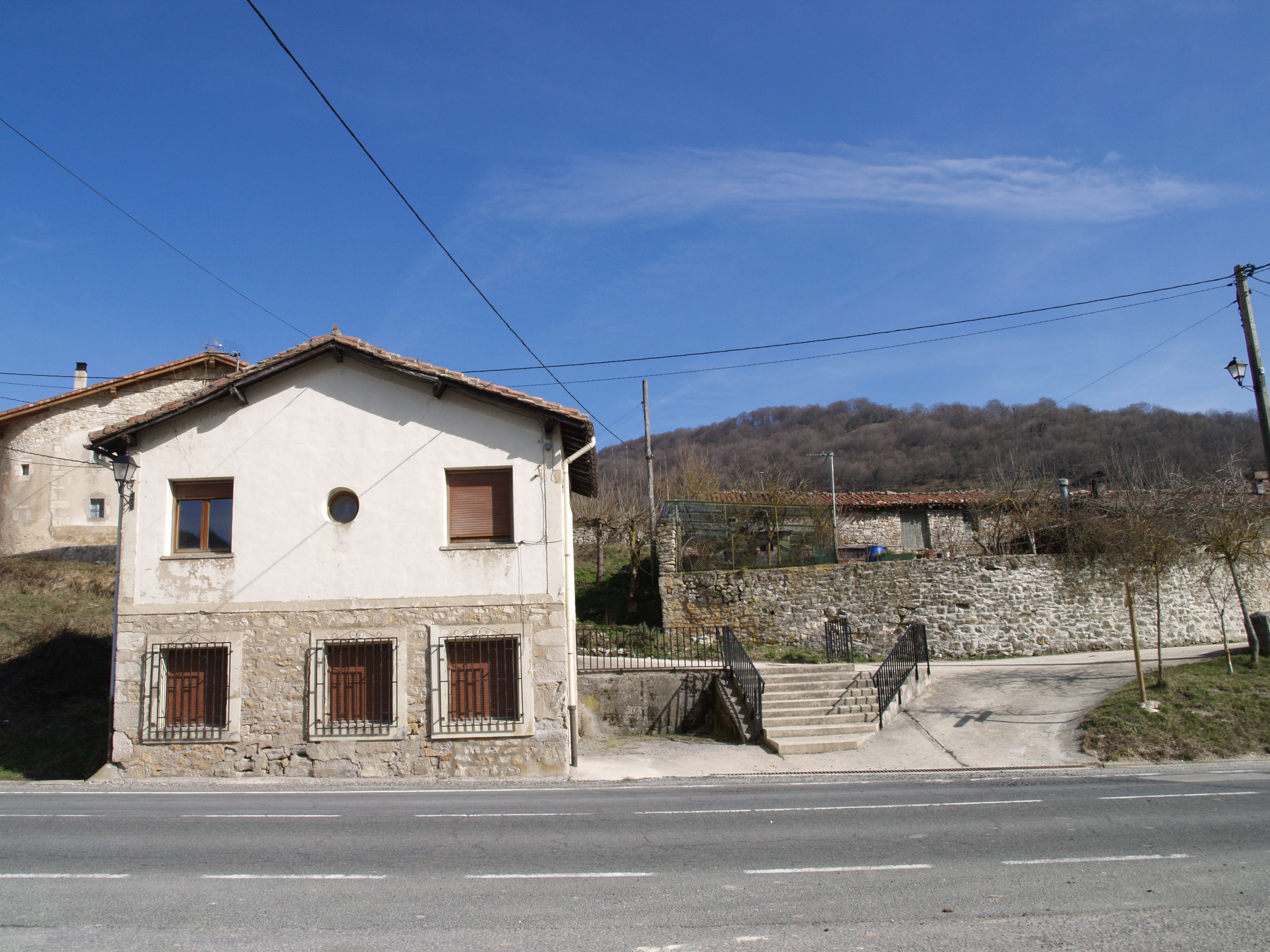
Alhóndiga. Social Centre

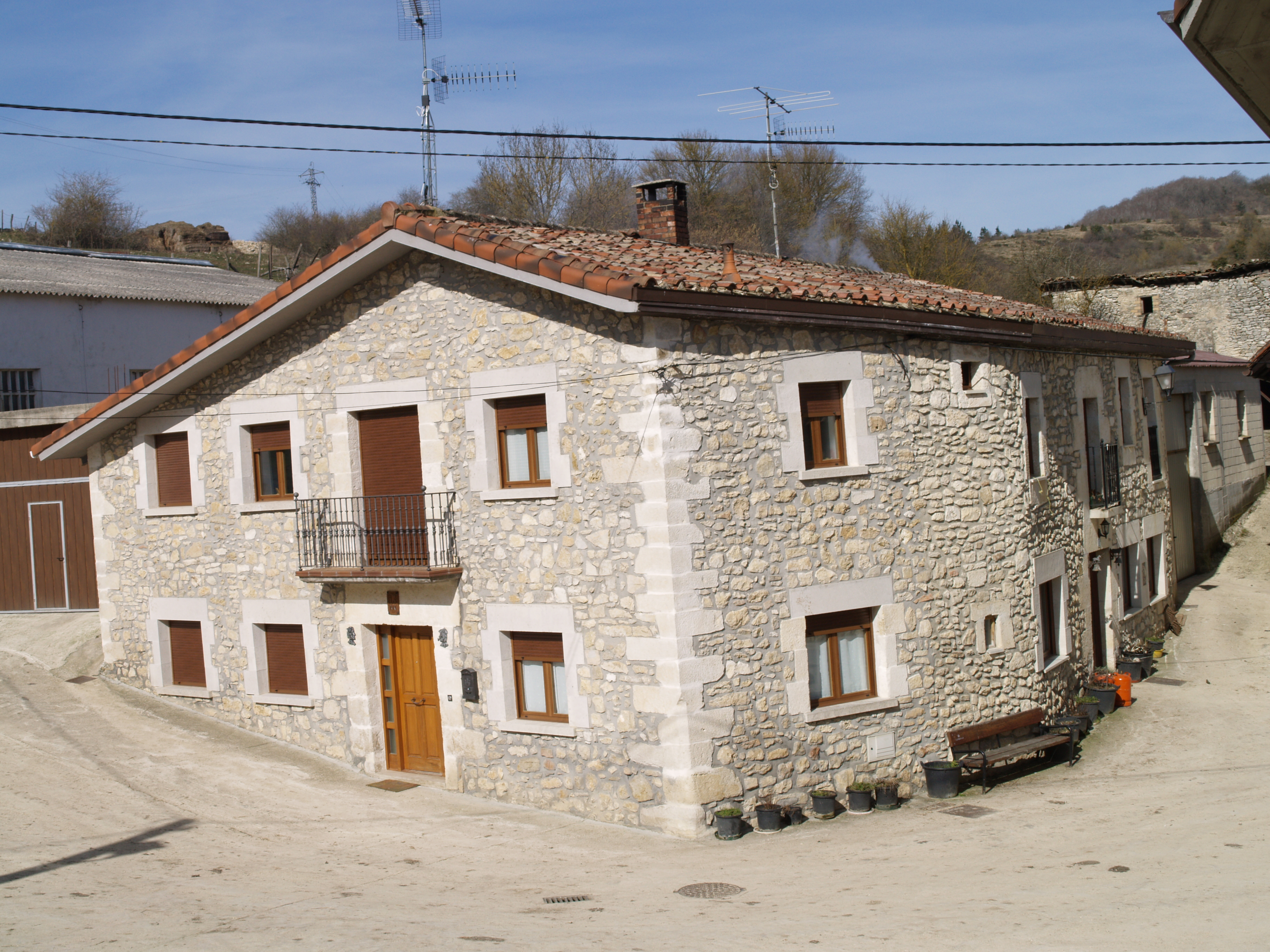
Former town hall

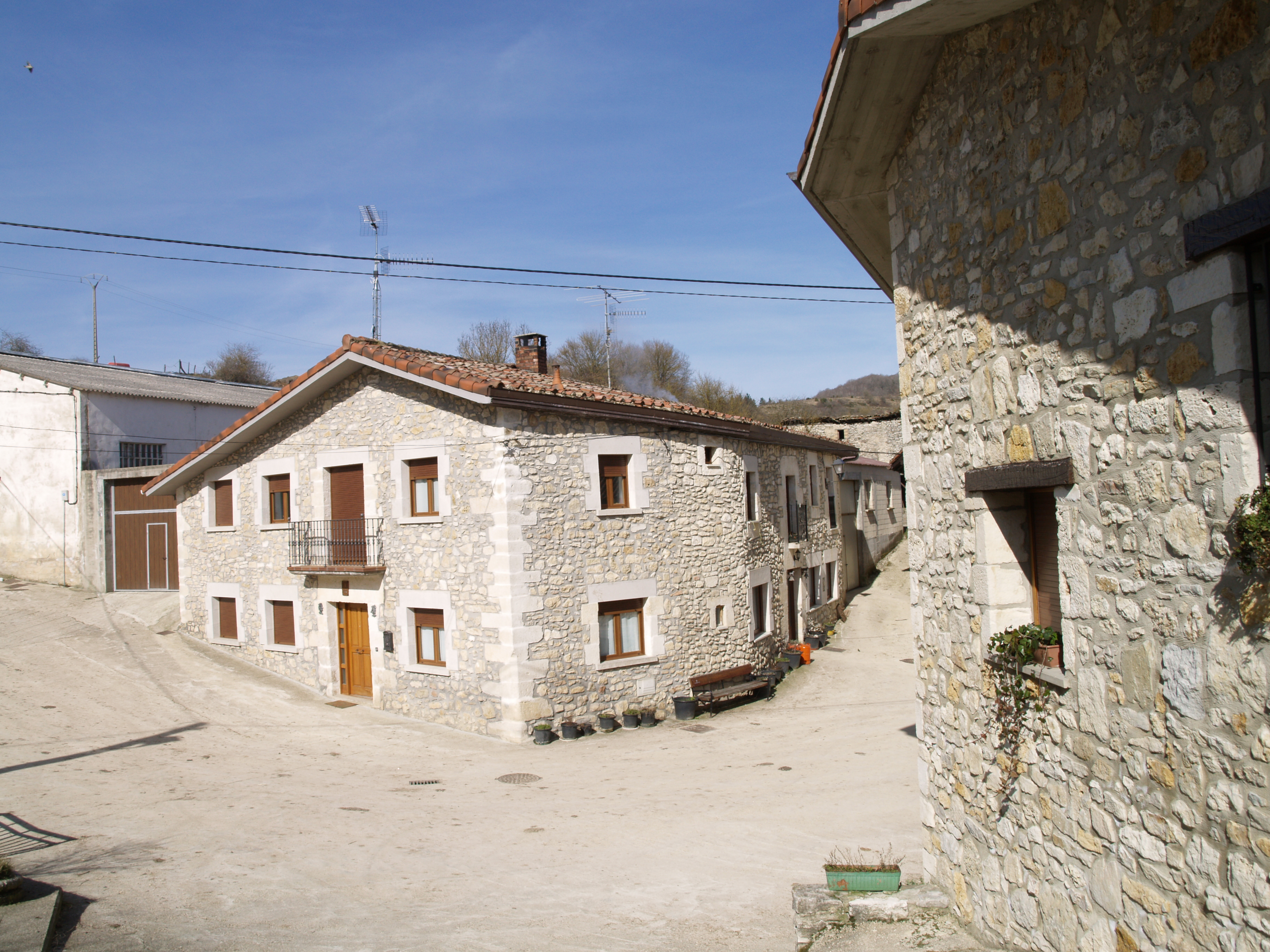
Vivid angles

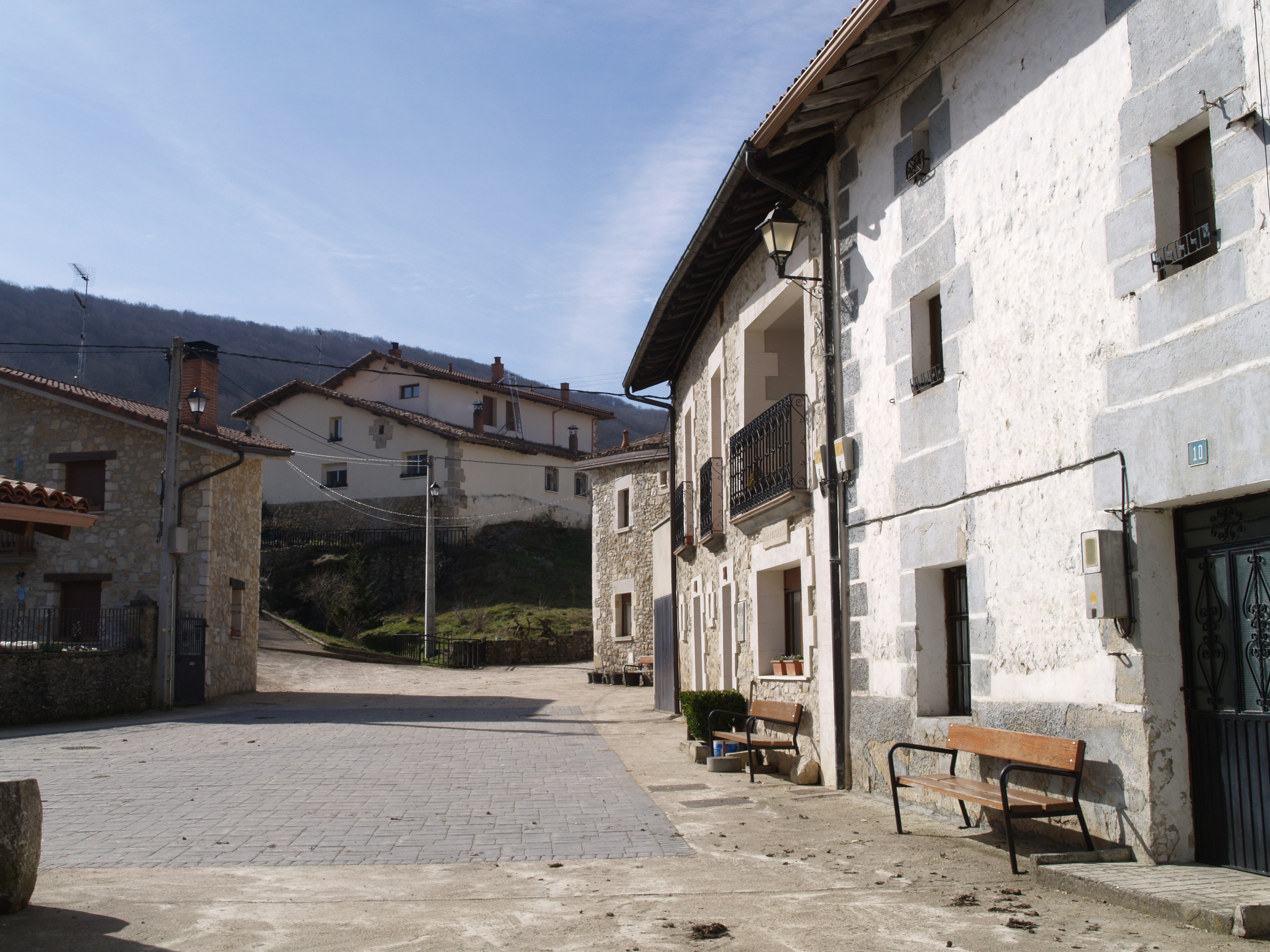
Ebro Street

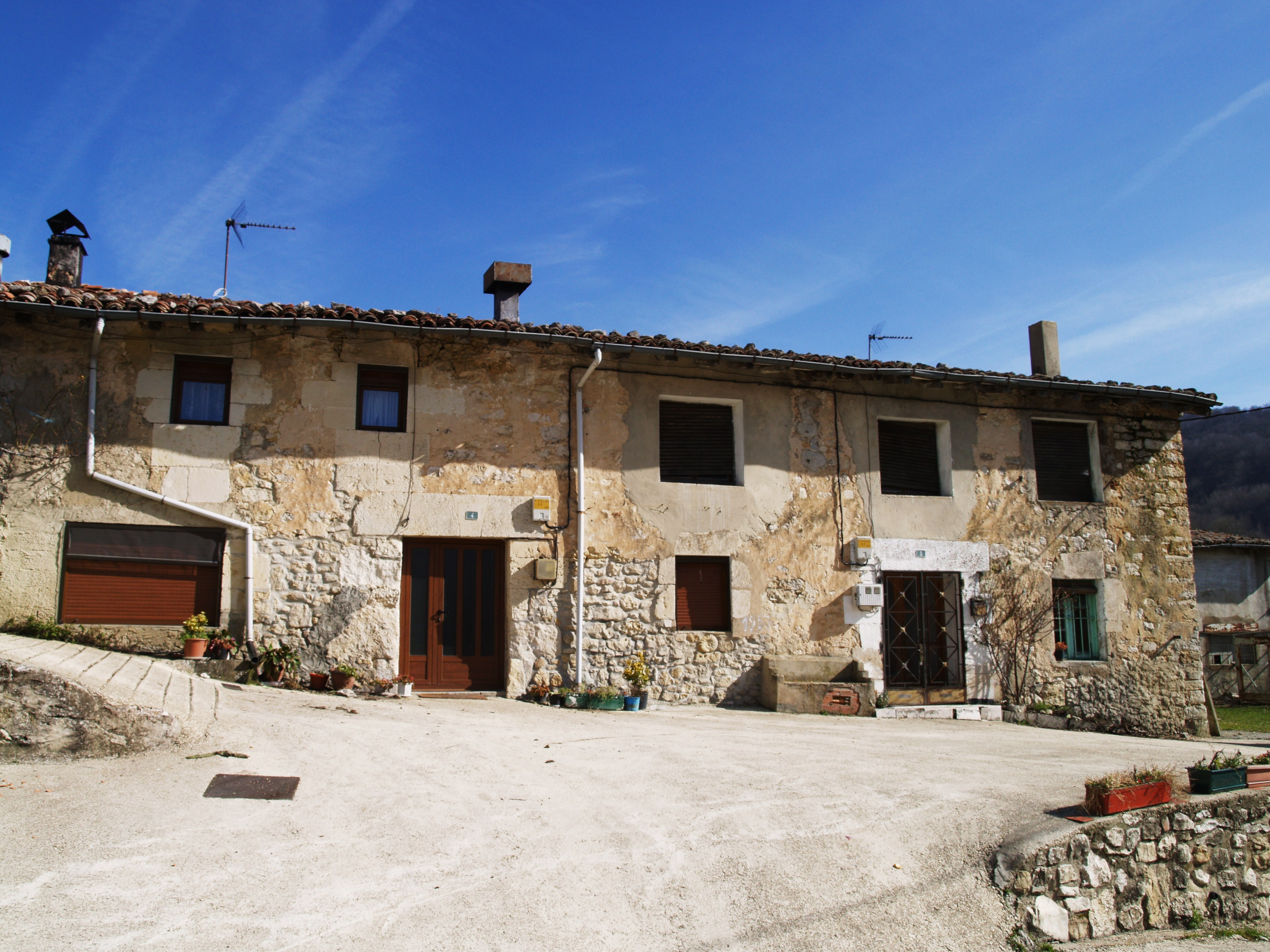
A classic house

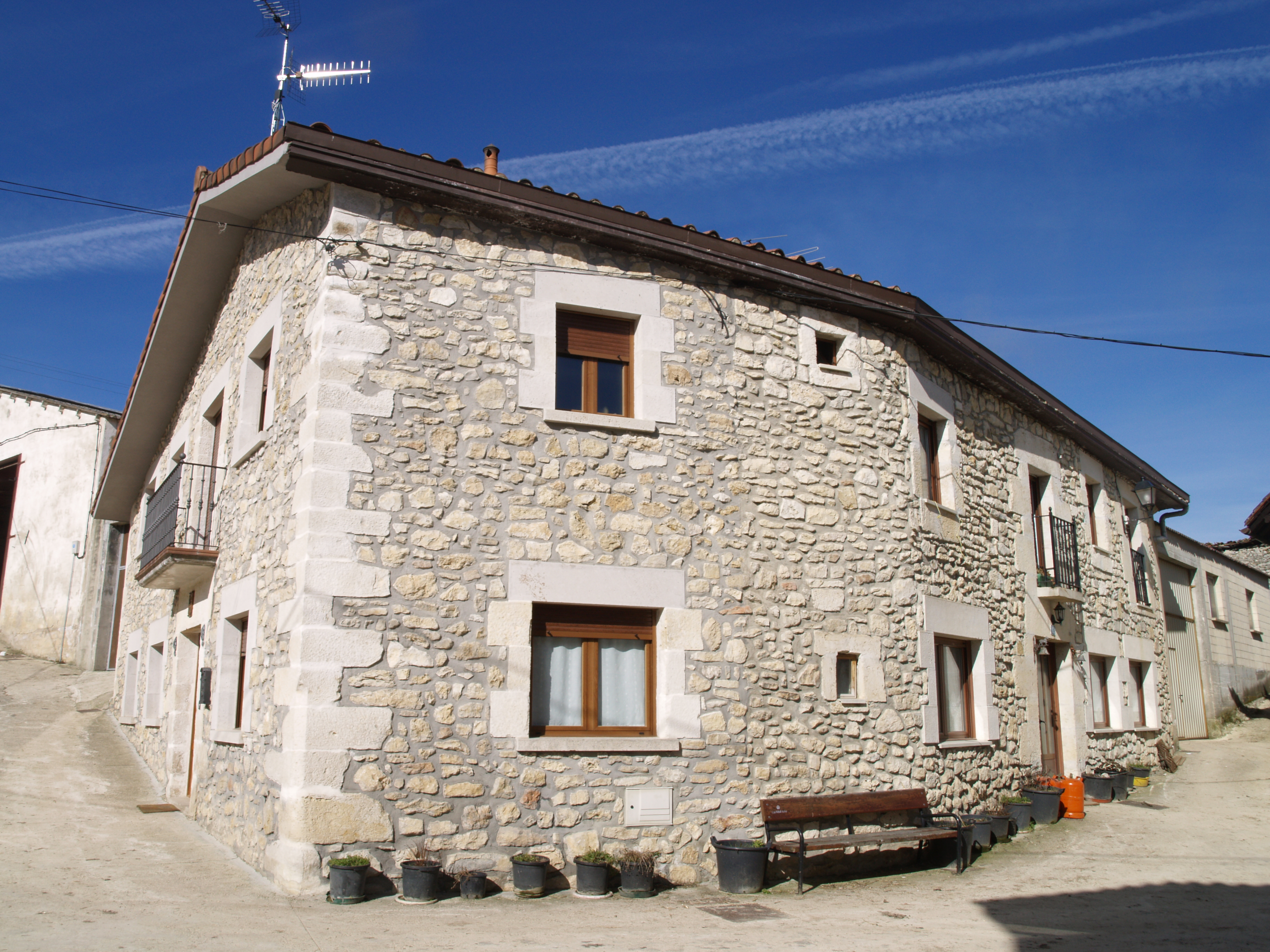
An historic house

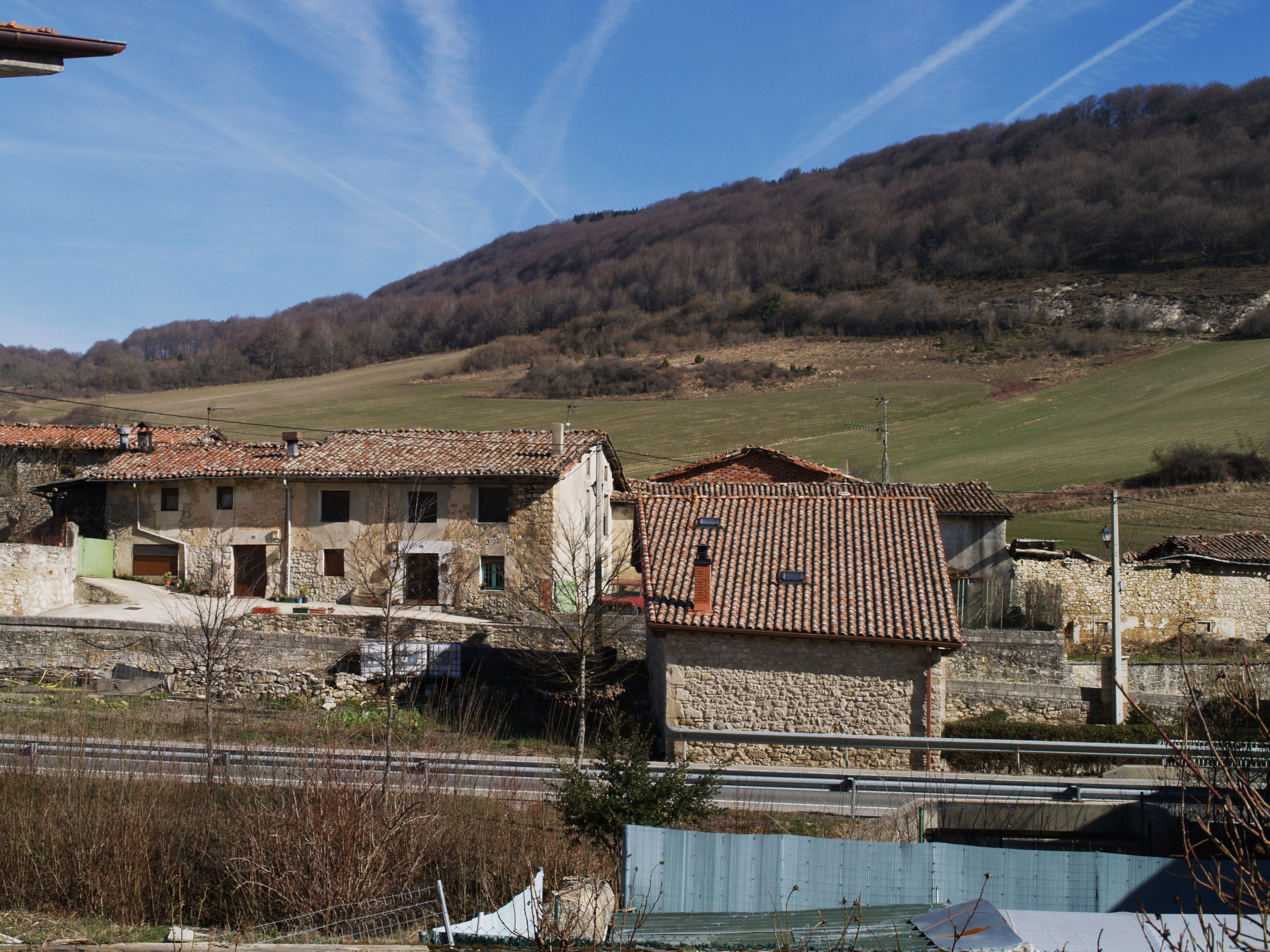
Rural houses

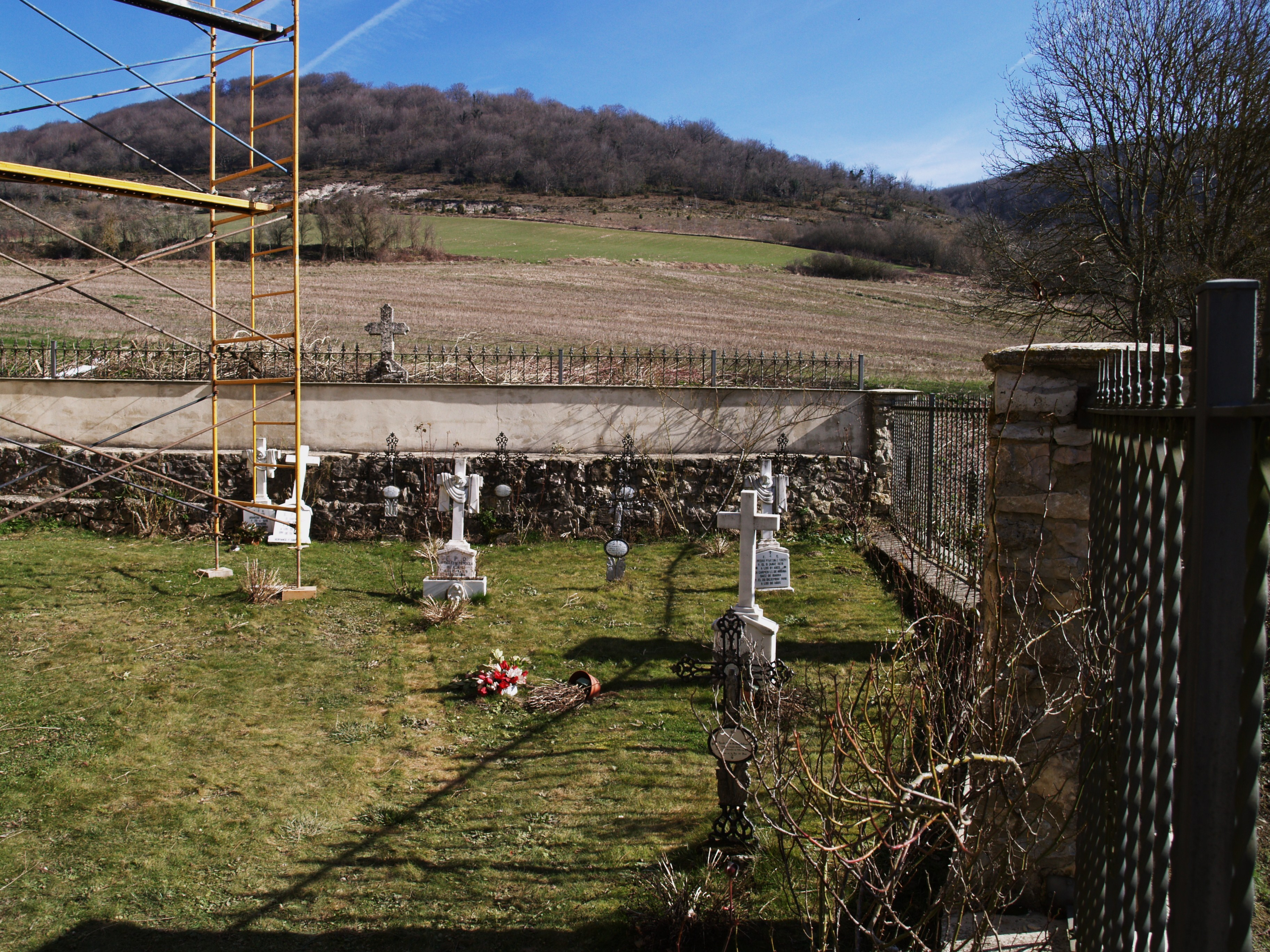
Cemetery awaiting restructuring

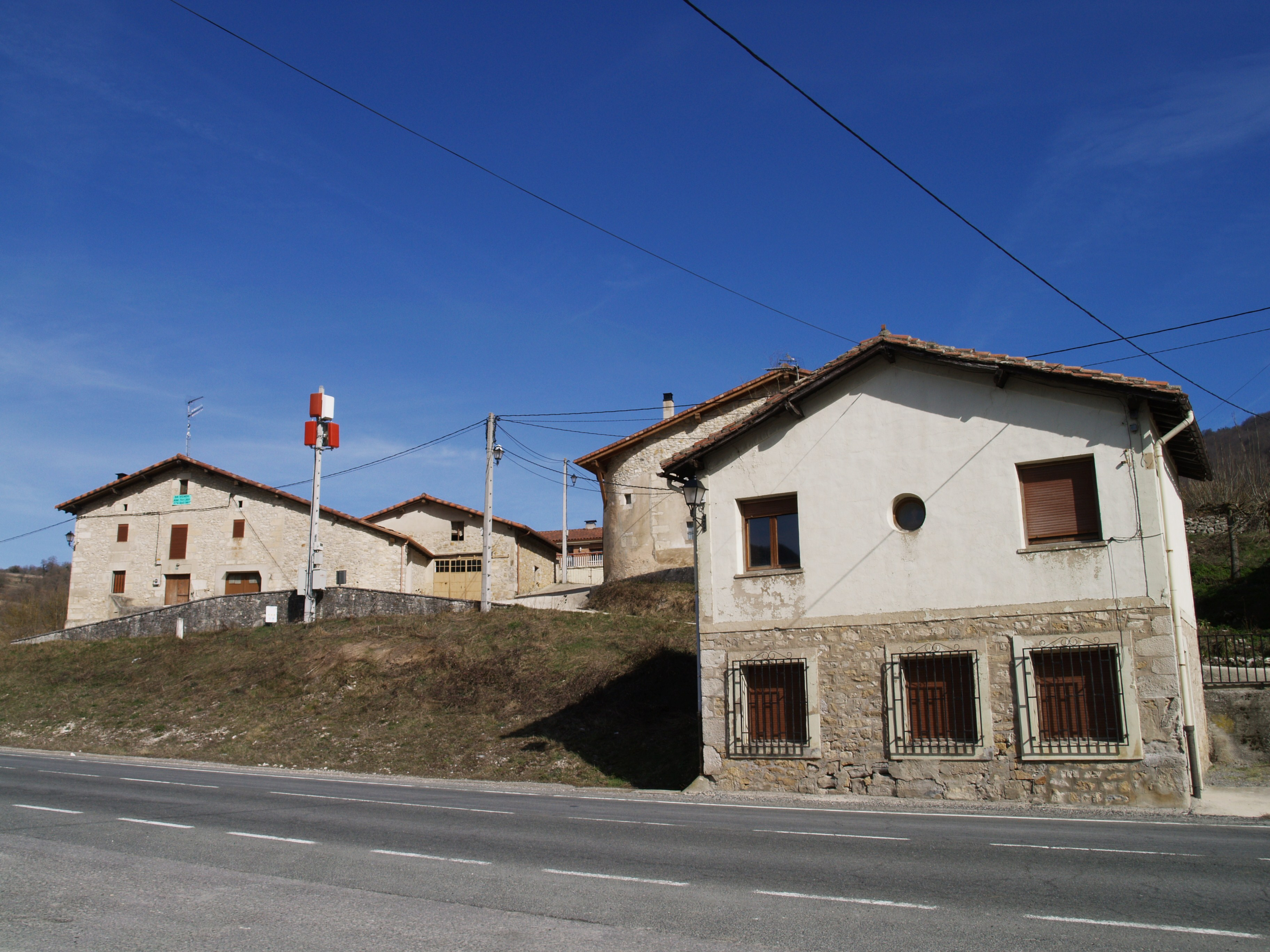
Social Centre

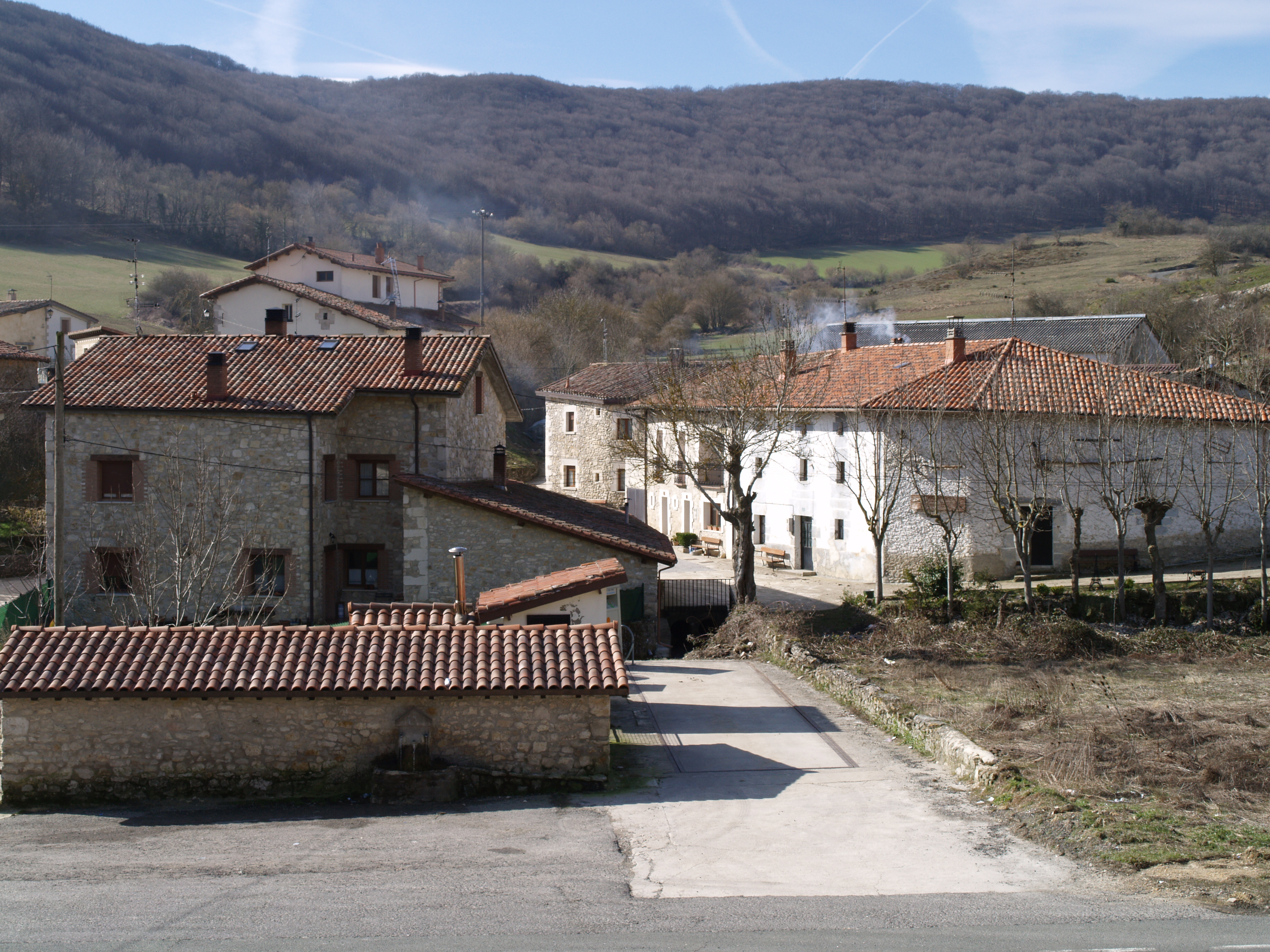
With the trough in the foreground

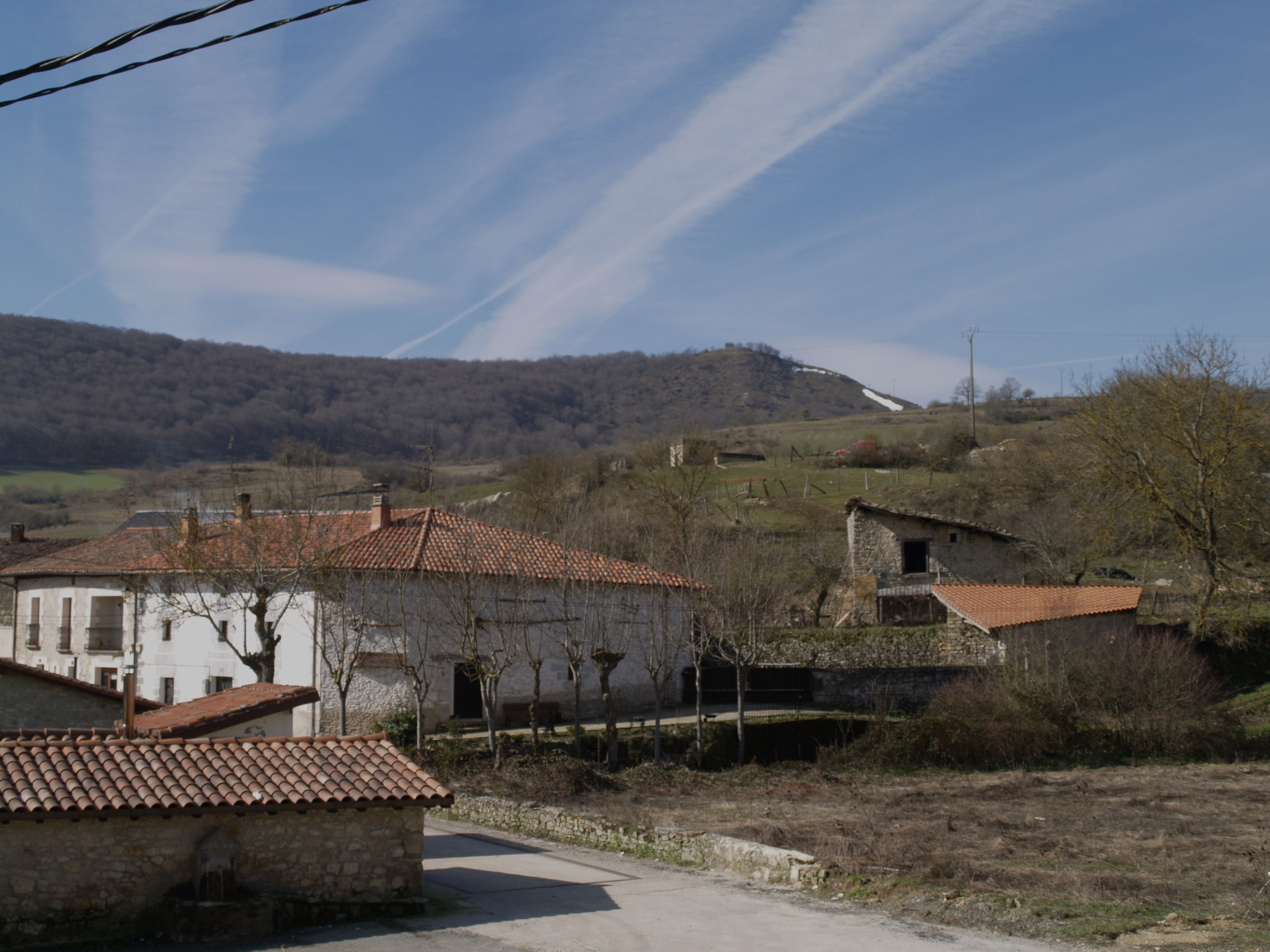
With La Picota Lete in the background

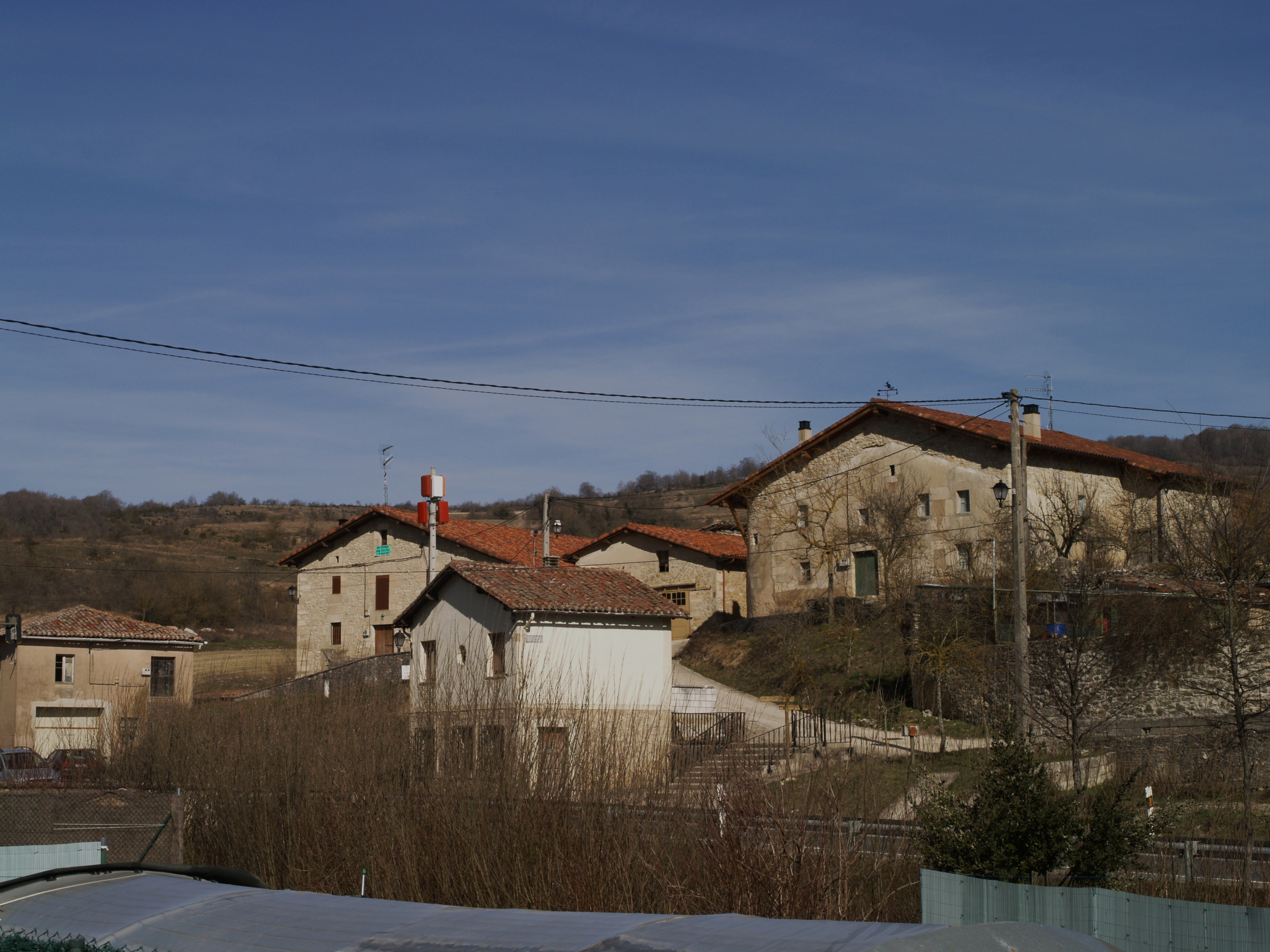
A set of houses on the eastern side

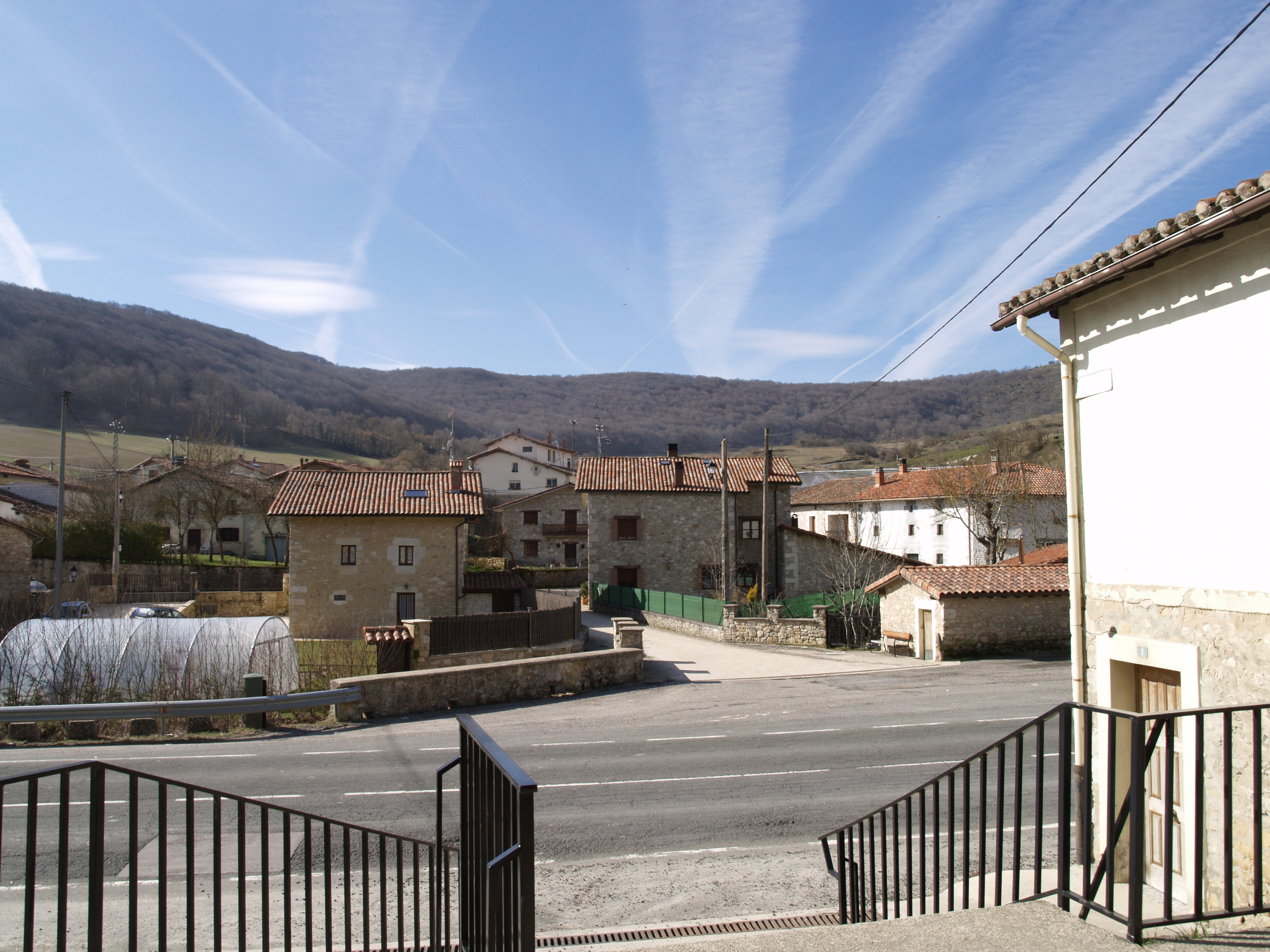
Road crossings

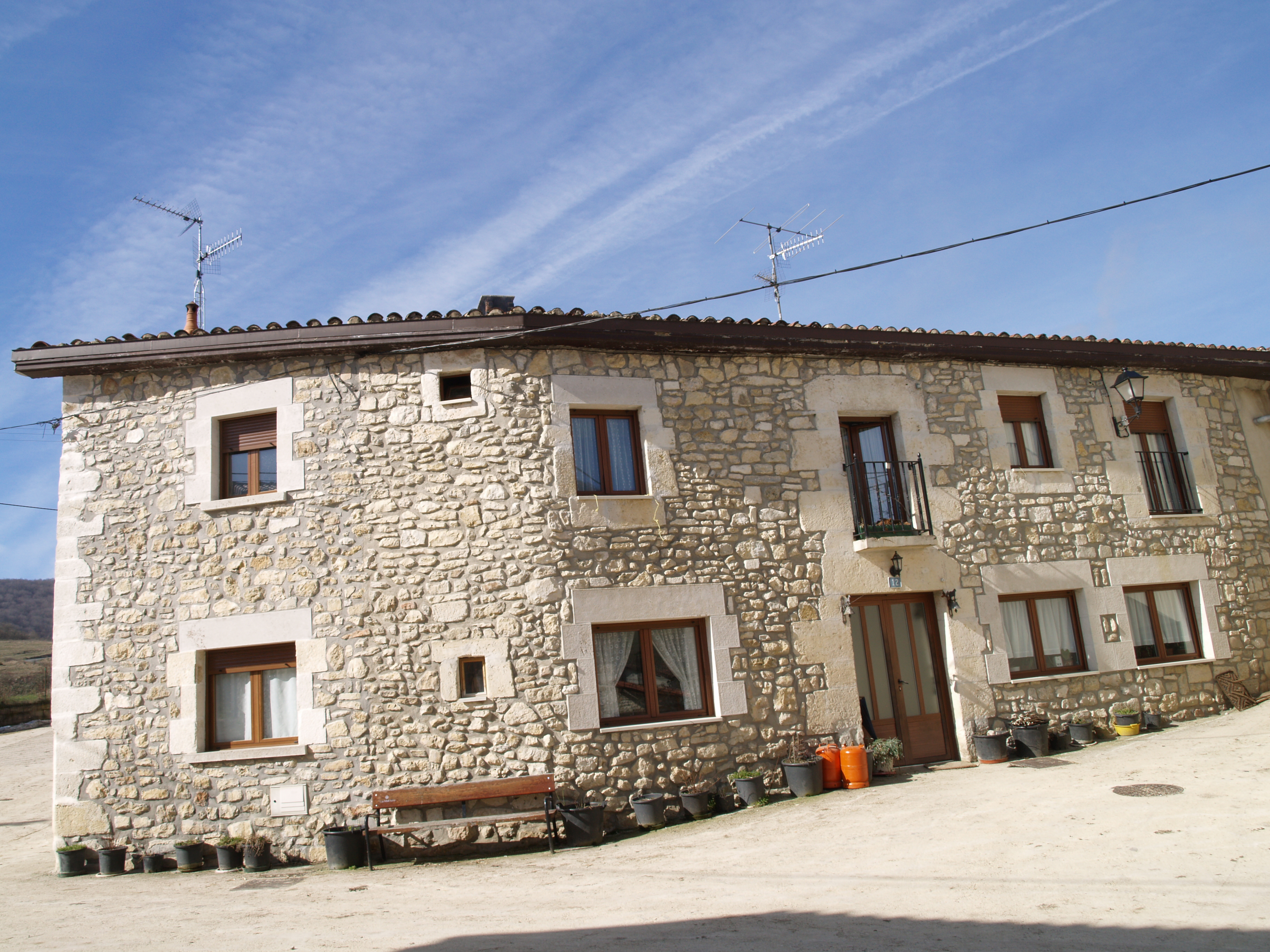
Beside the river

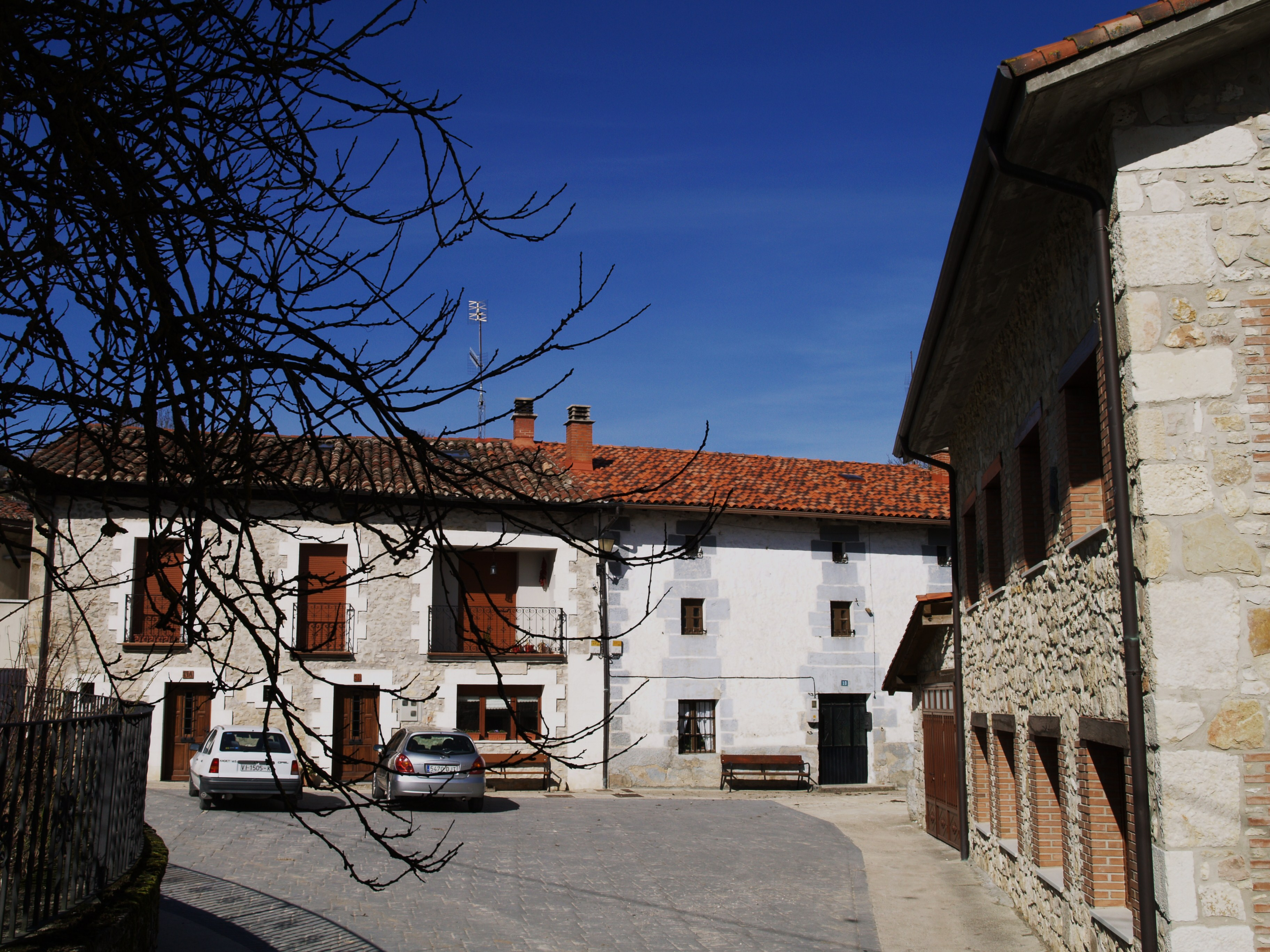
In the town center

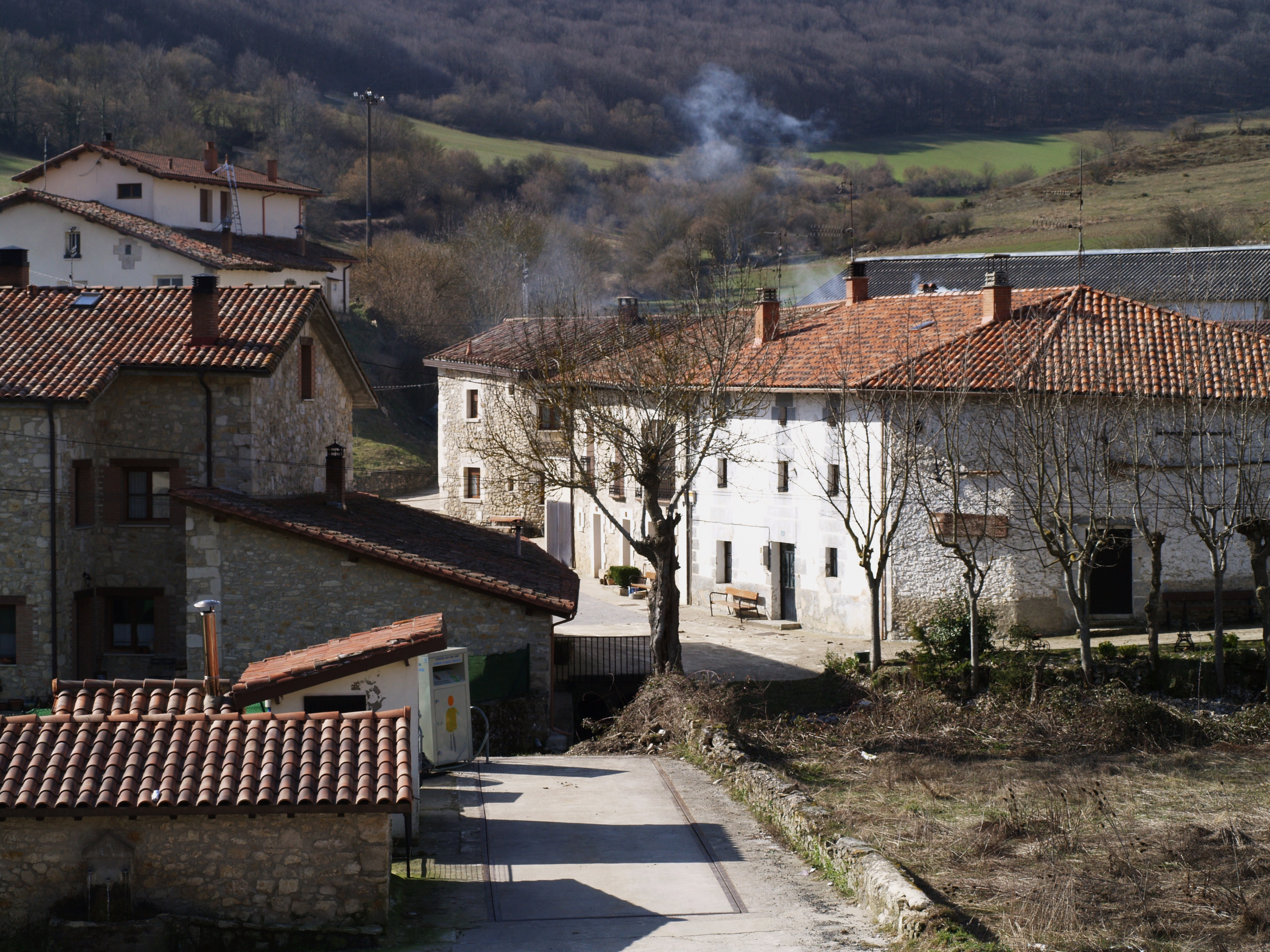

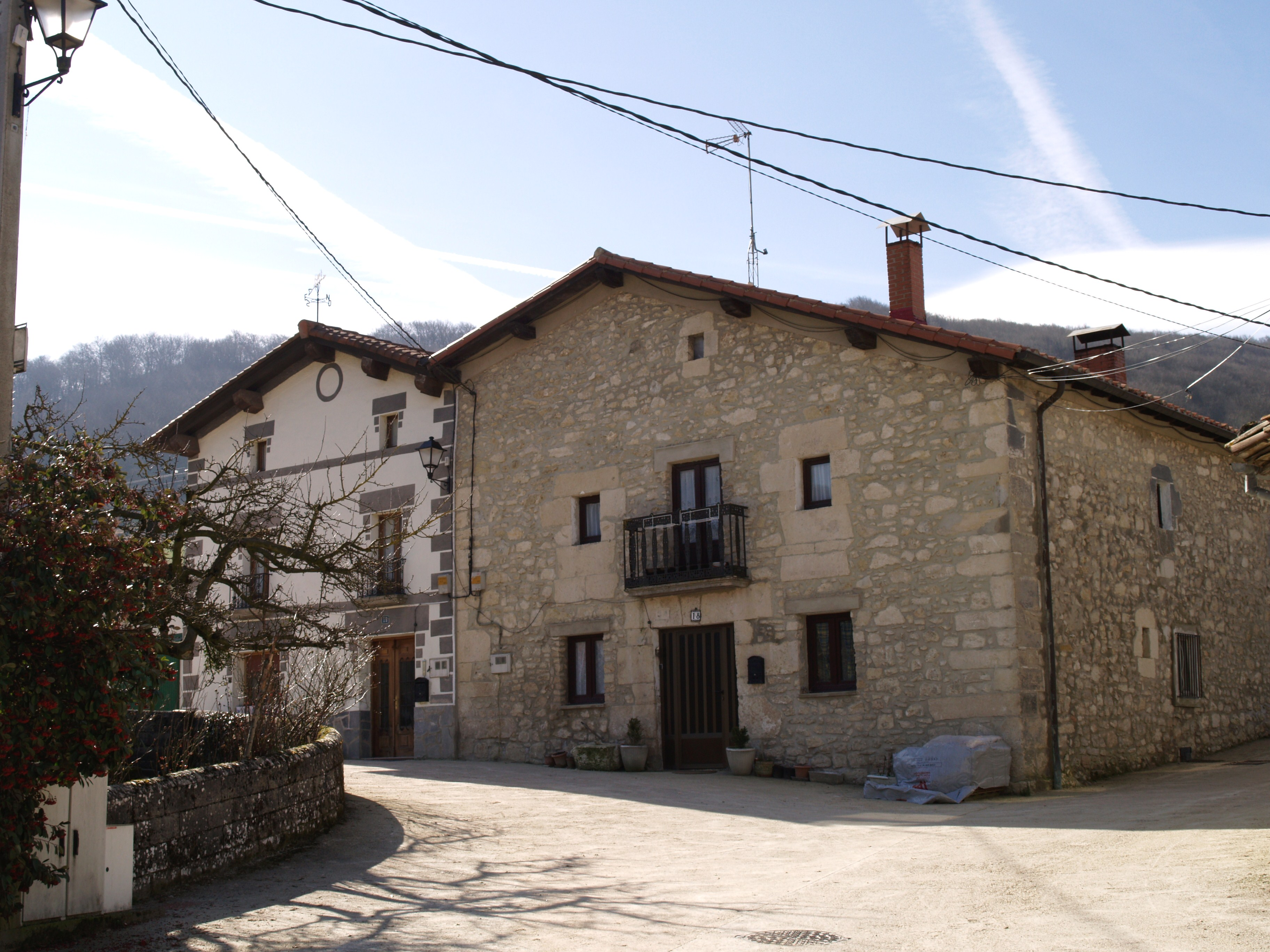

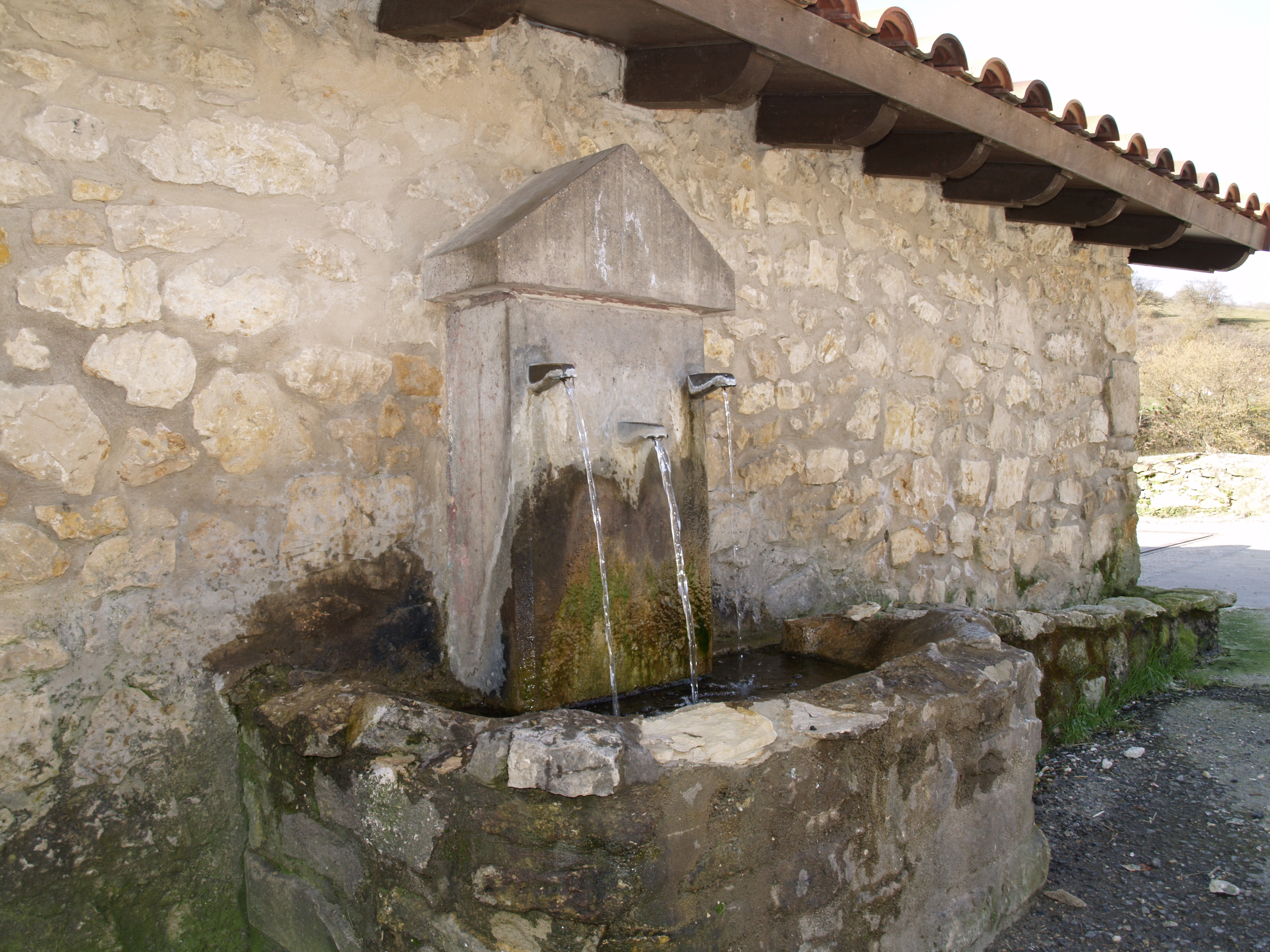
Monumental Fountain

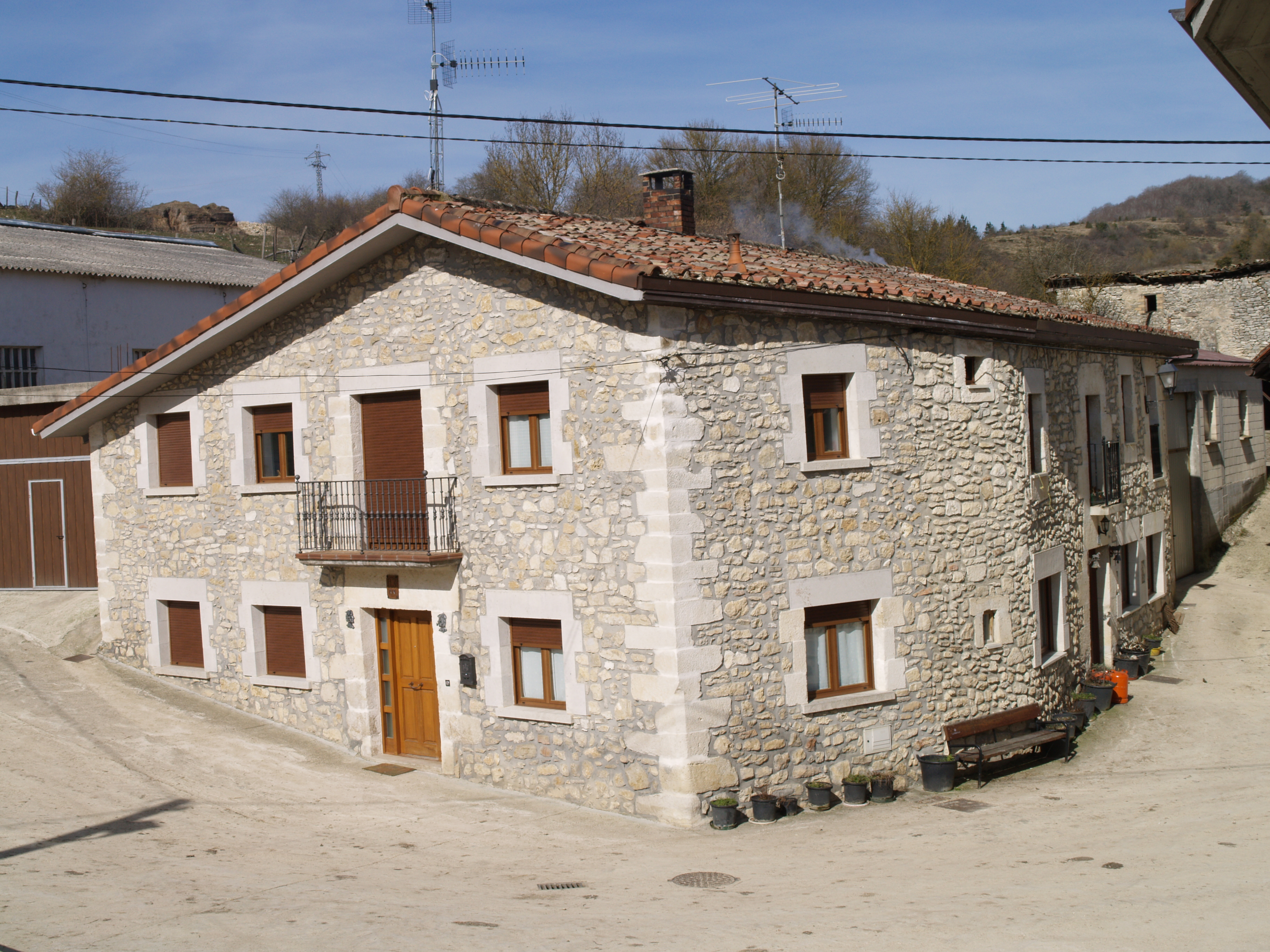
Past and present history

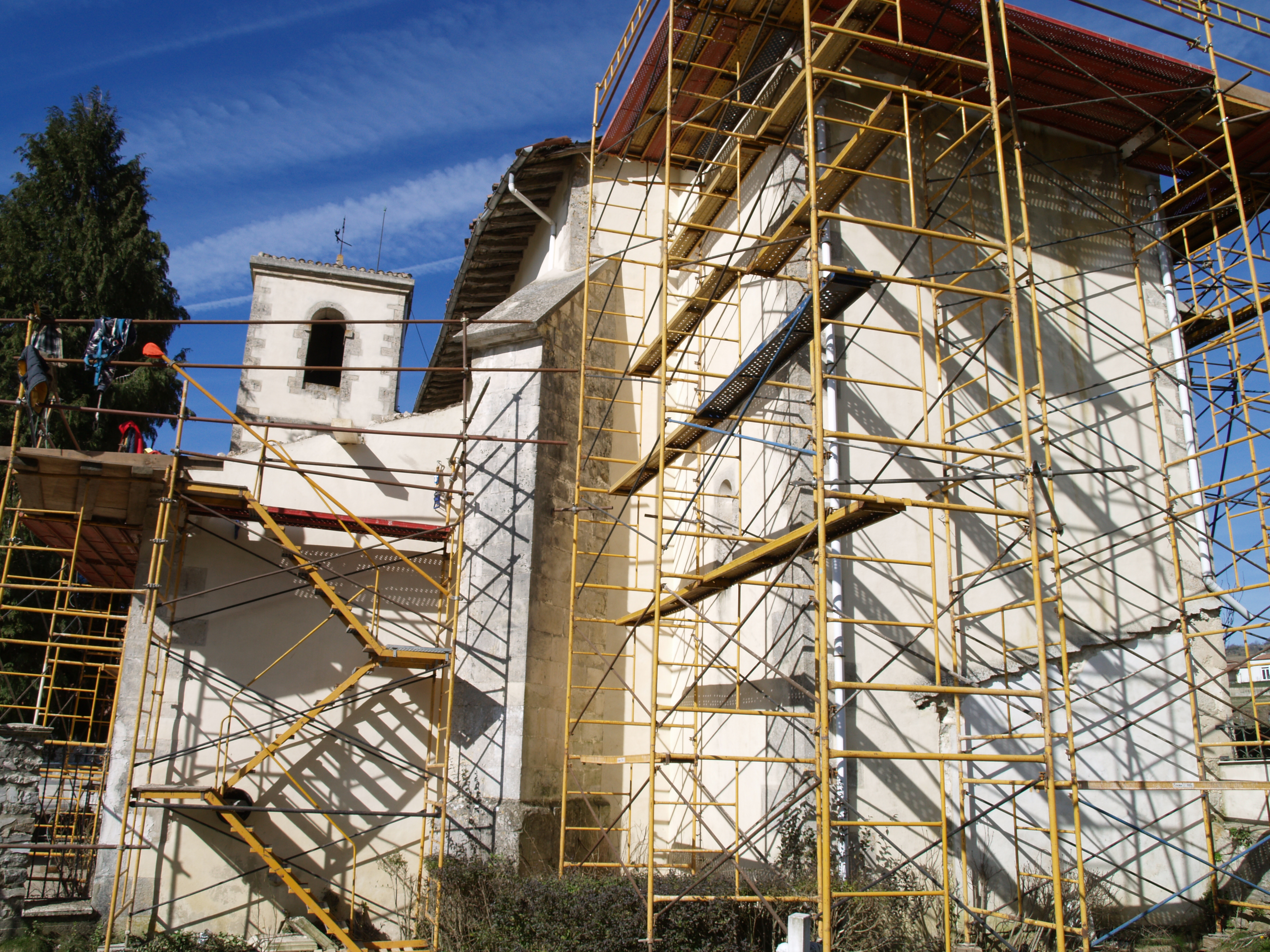
Church under construction - 2009

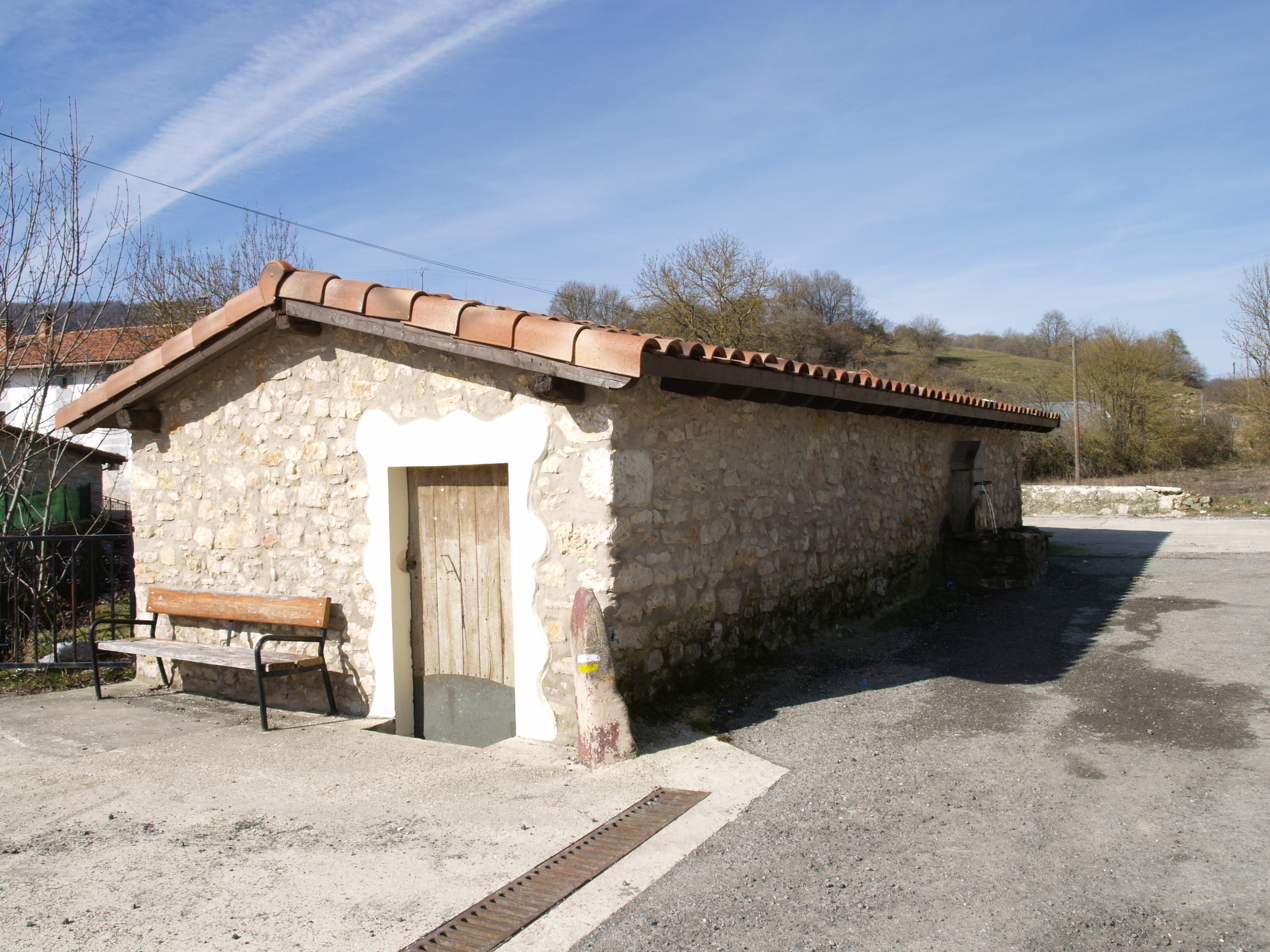
Municipal wash-house

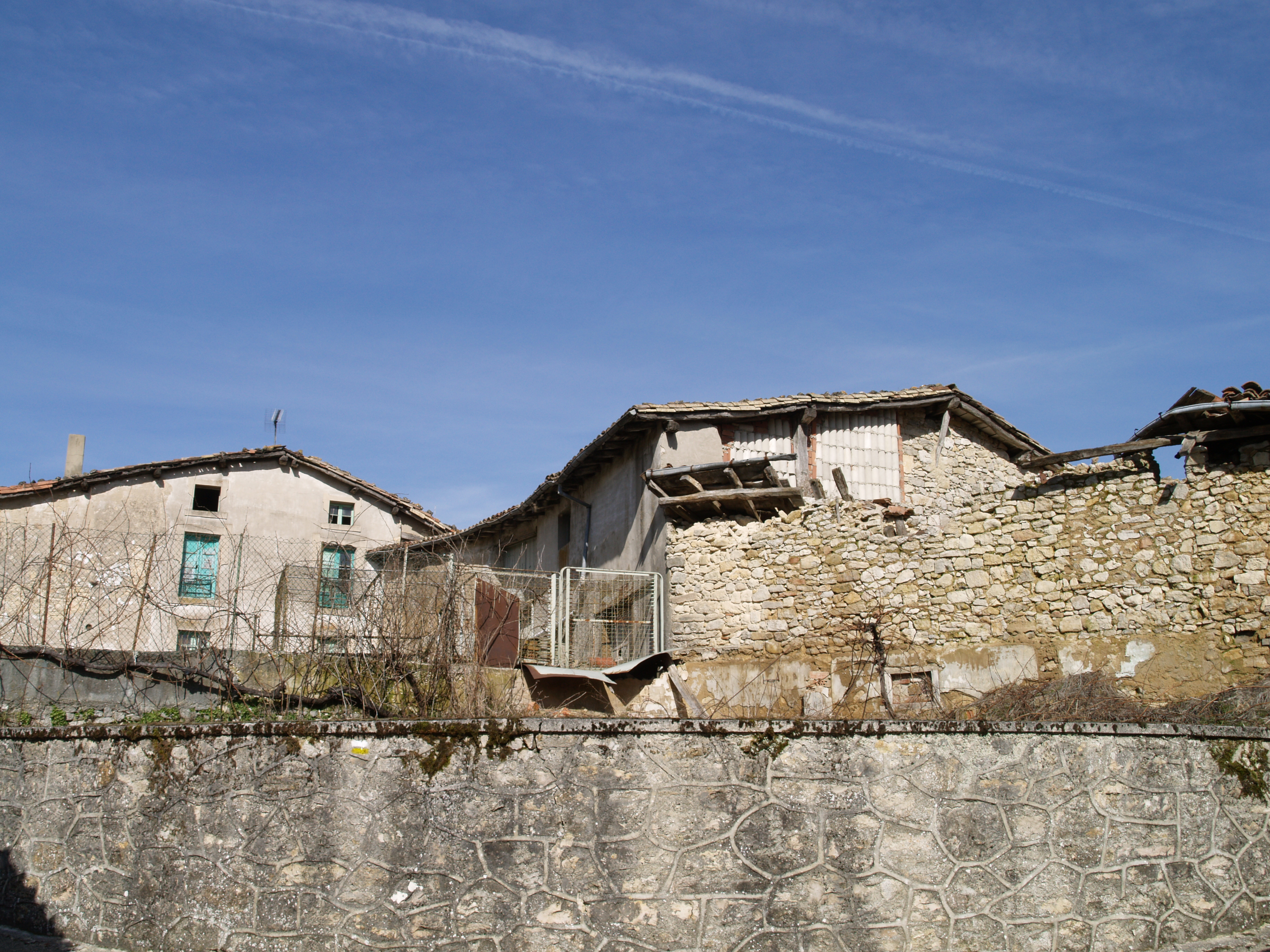

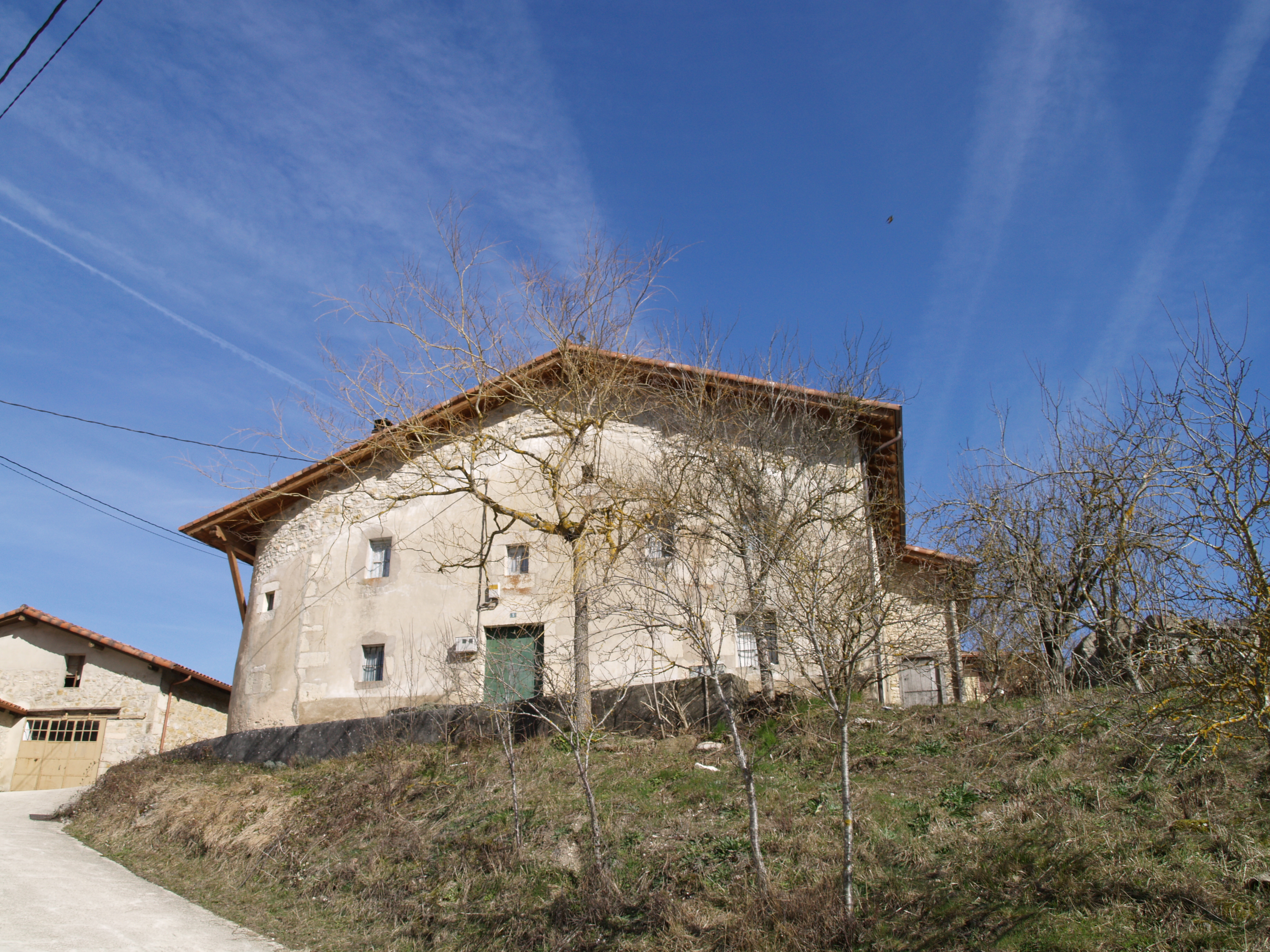

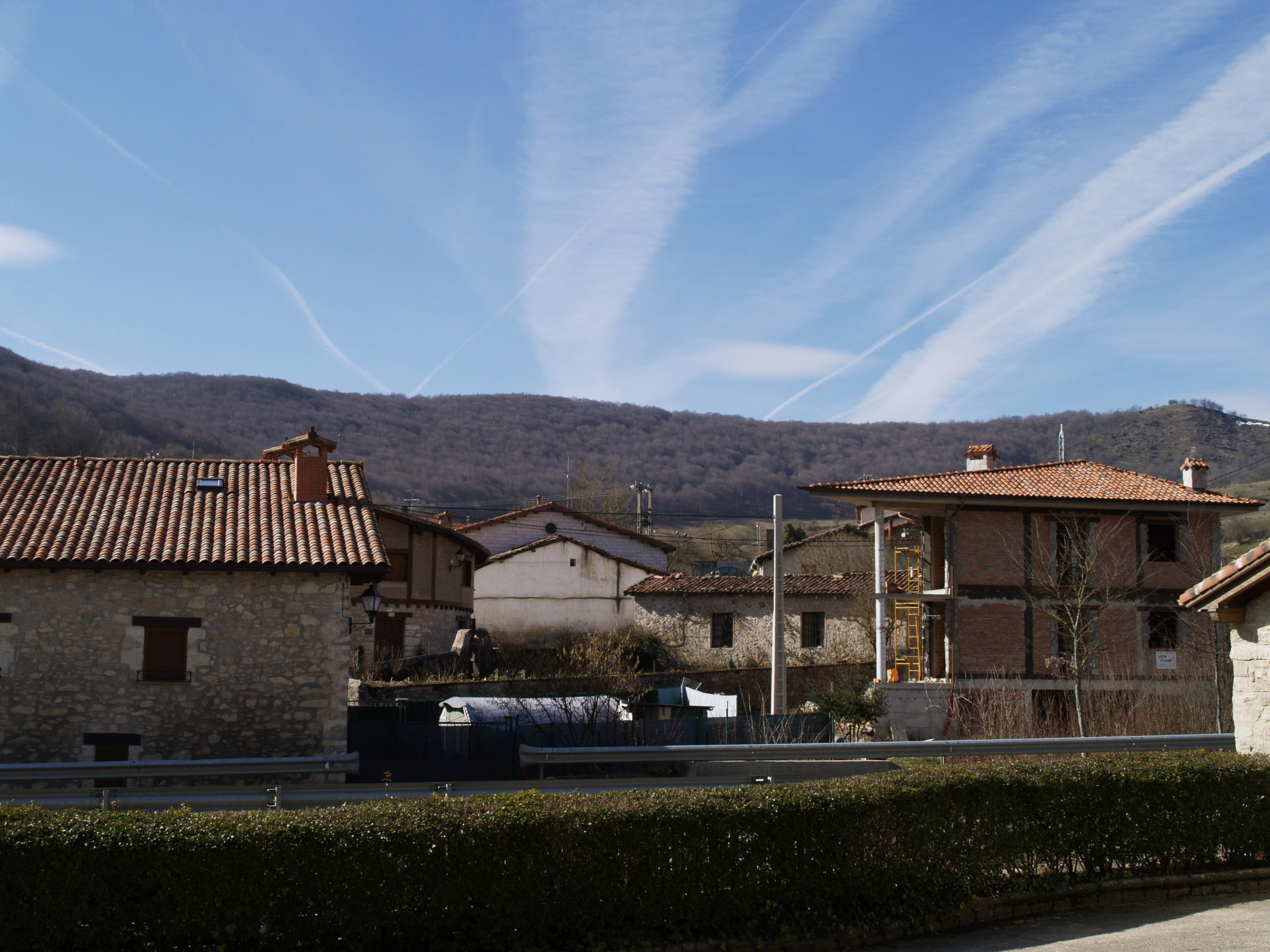
Mixture of constructions

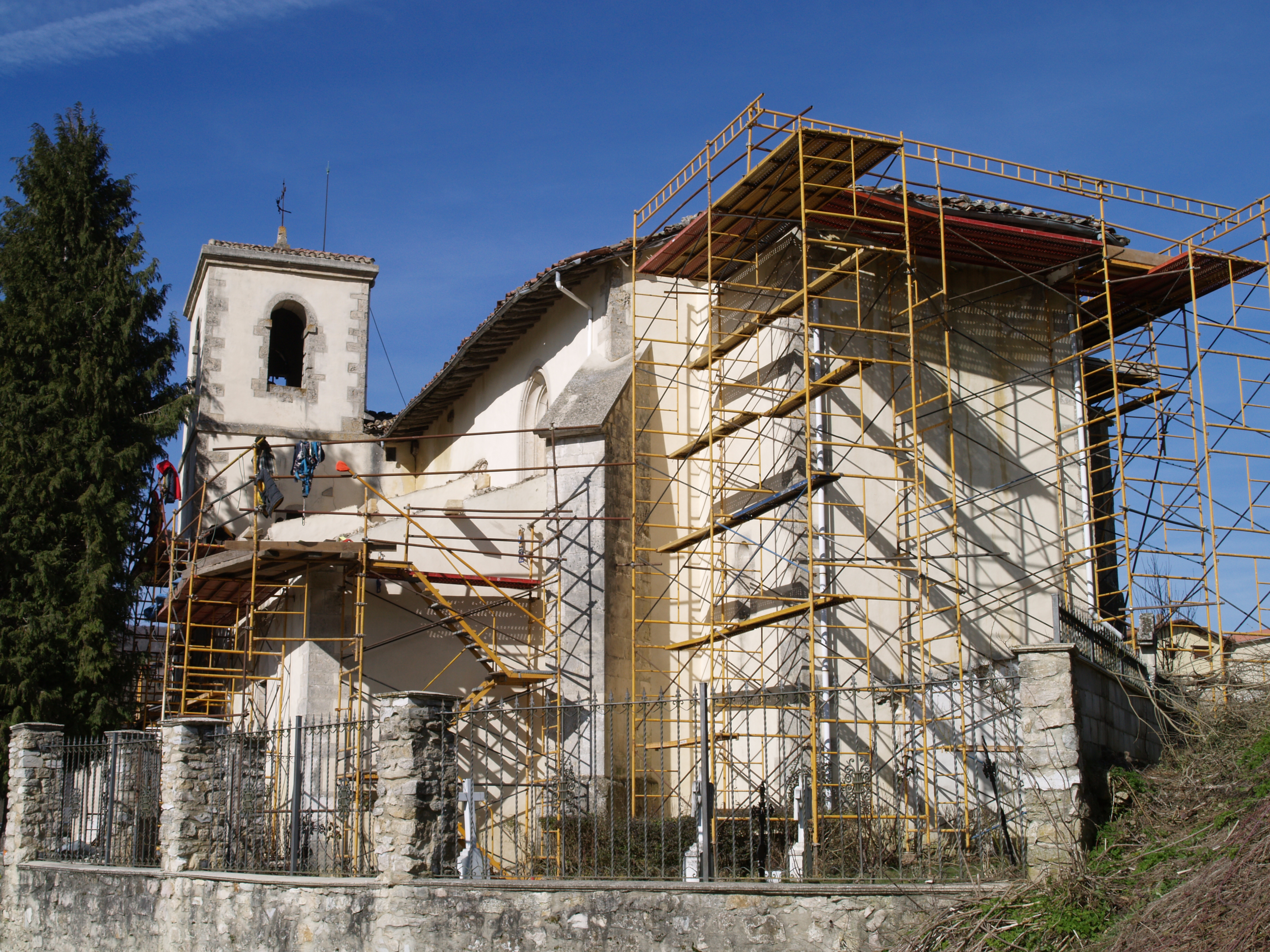

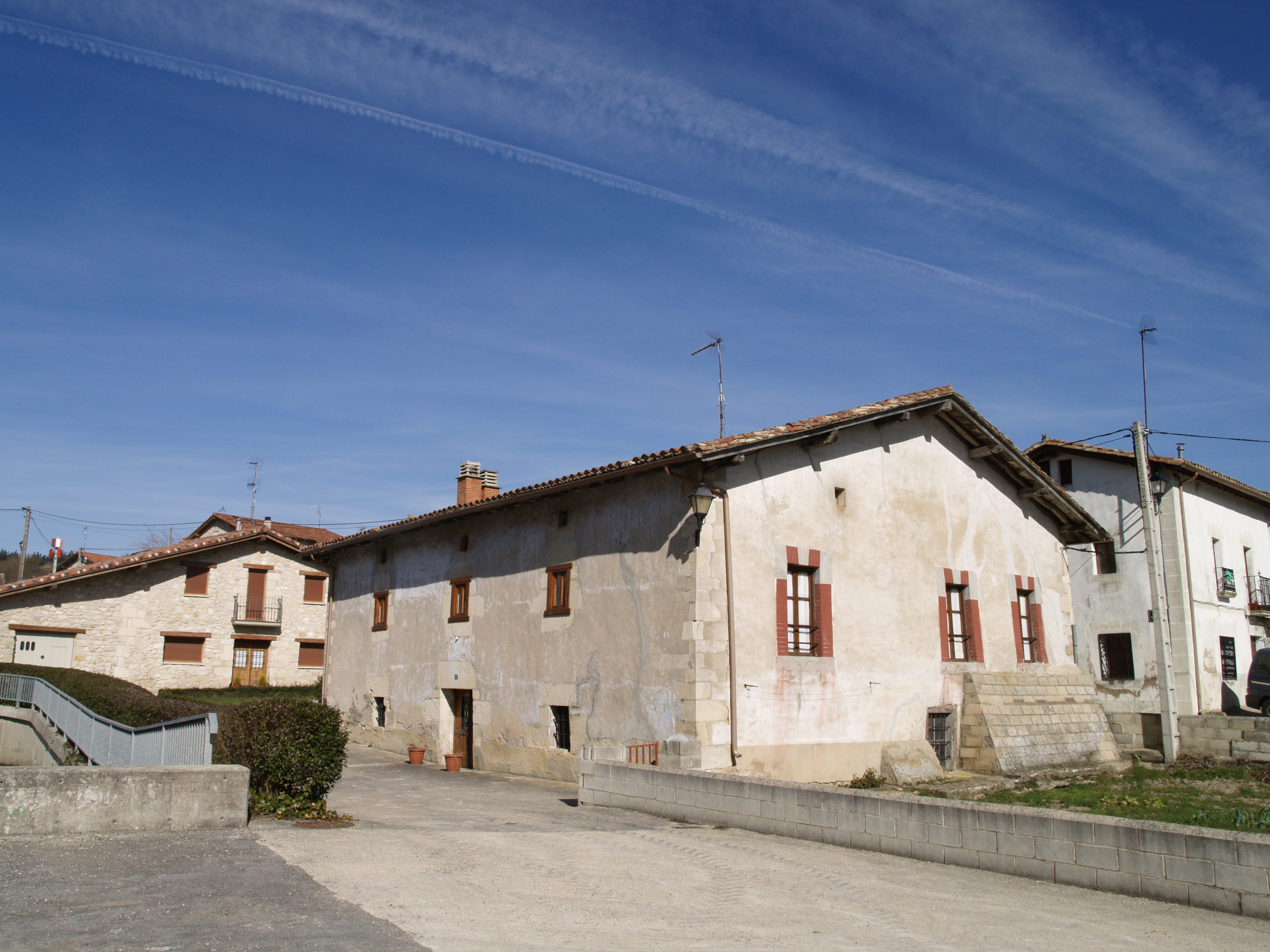

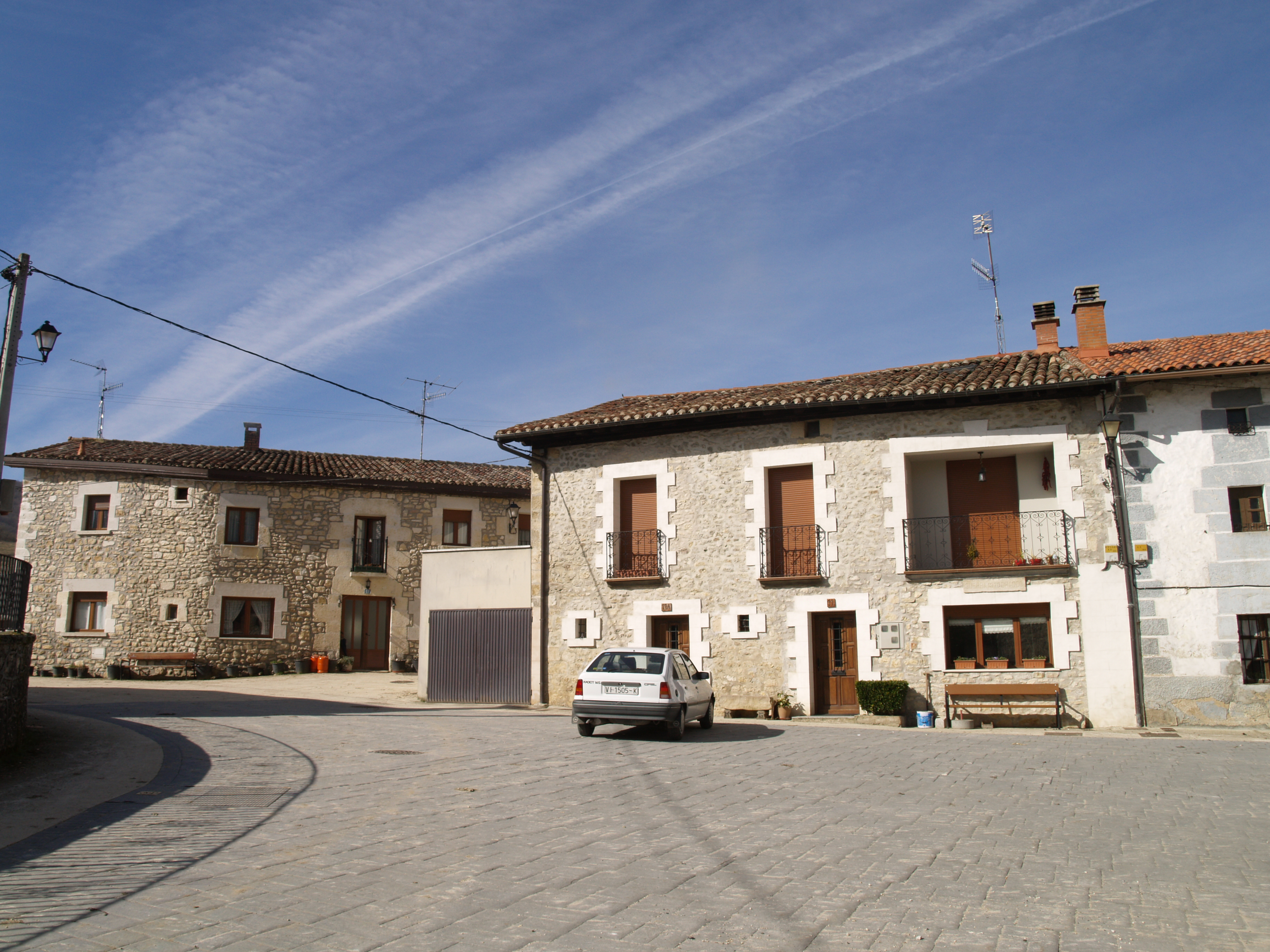

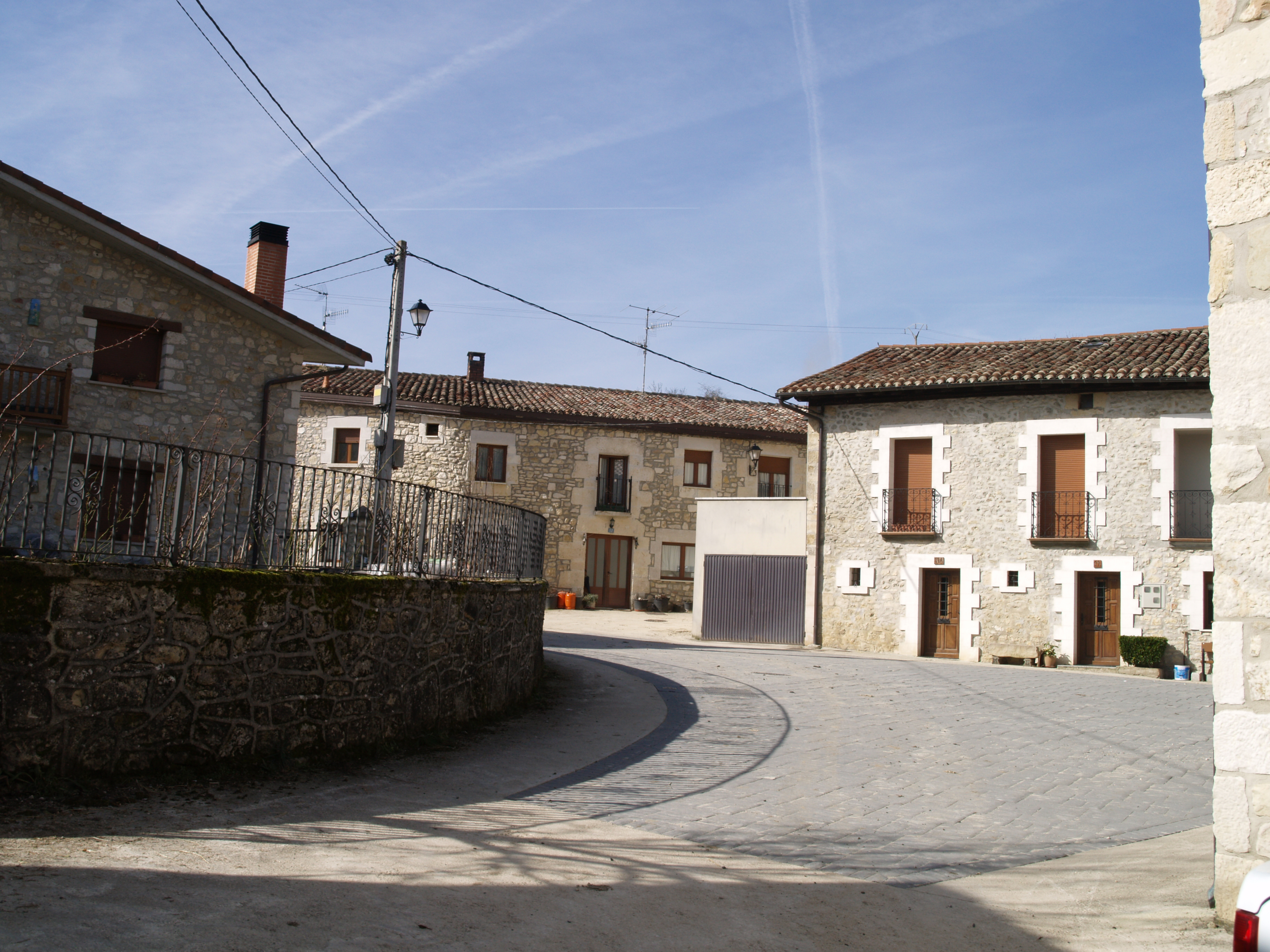

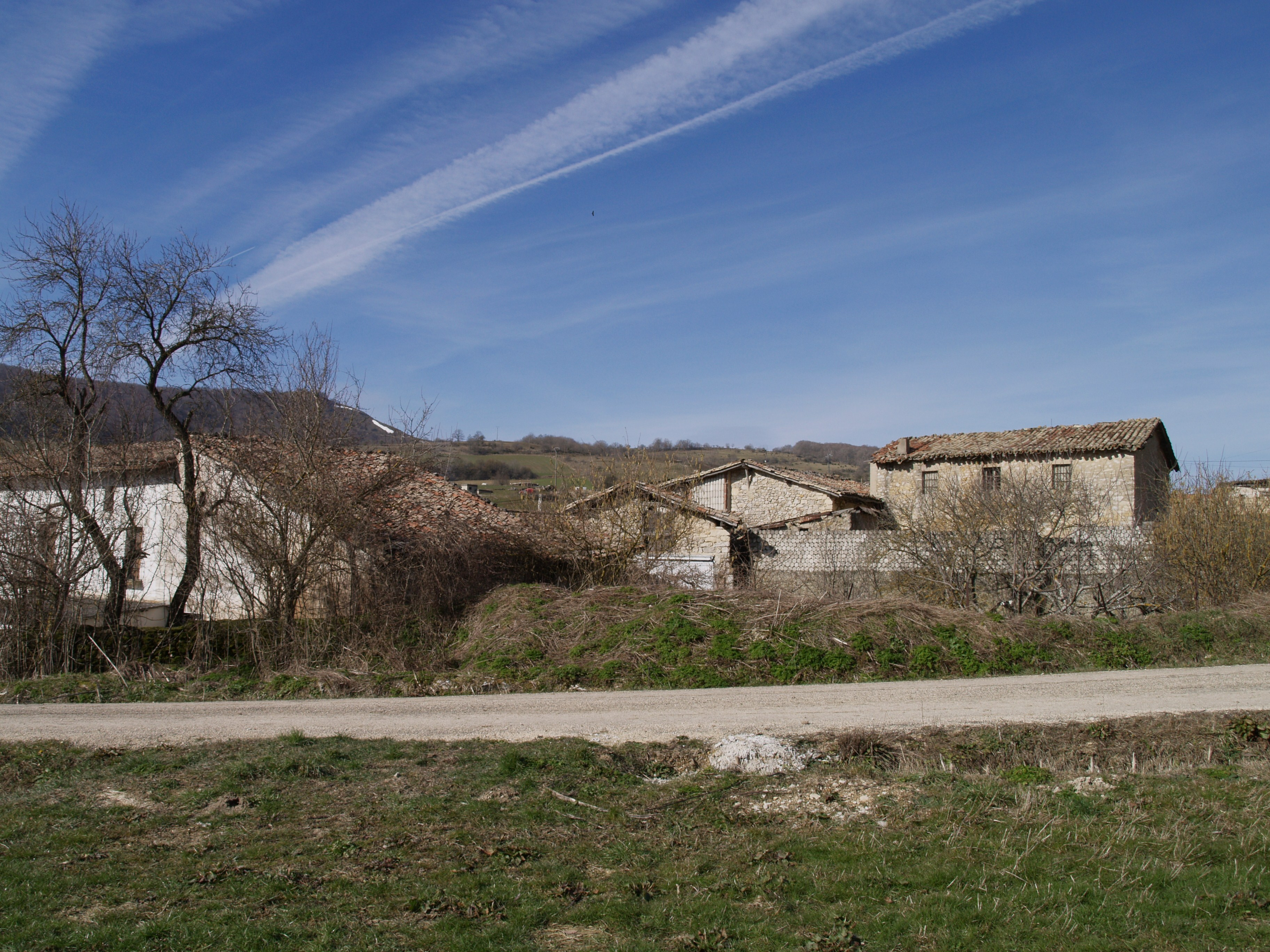

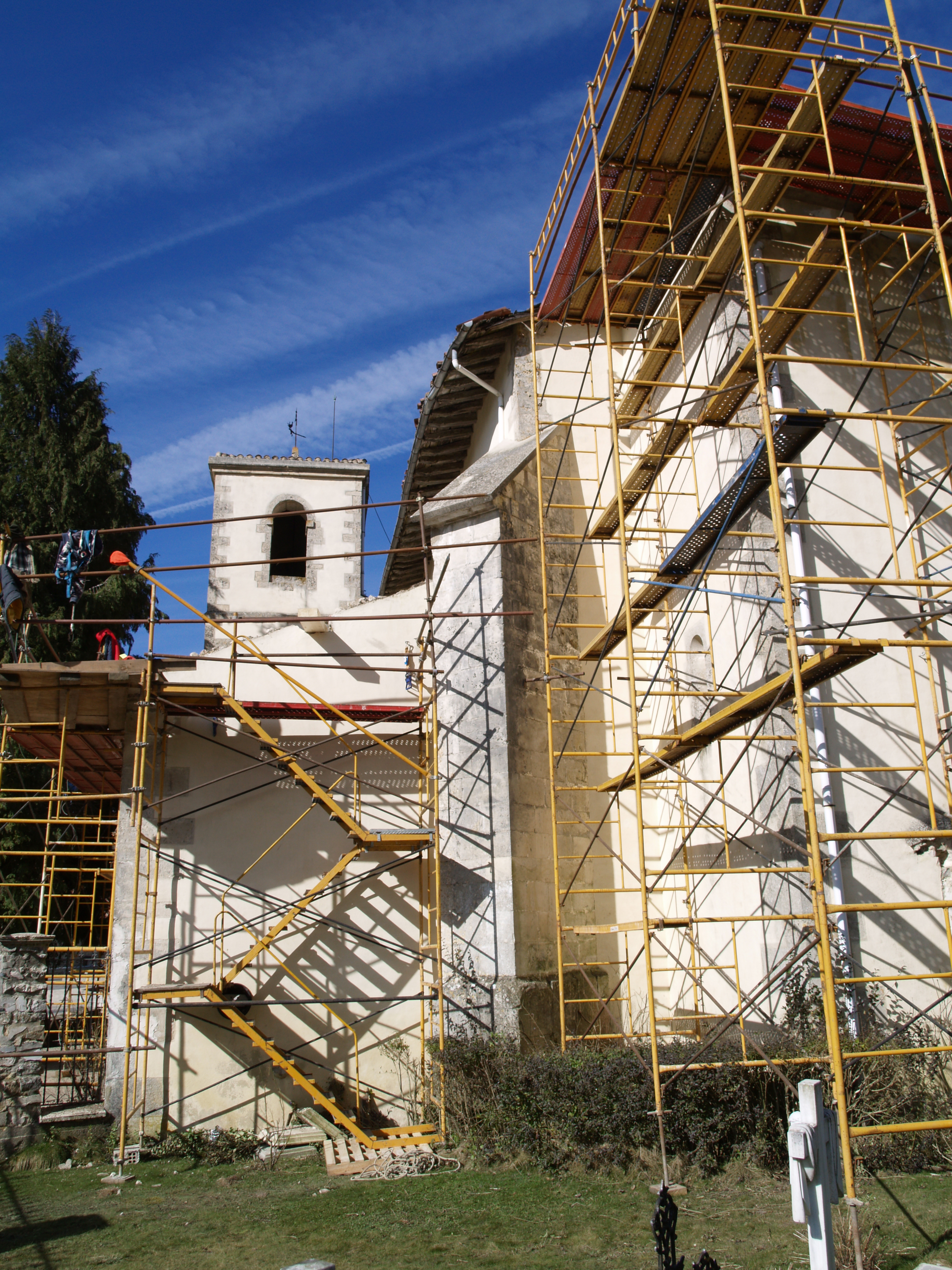
Religion and reconstruction

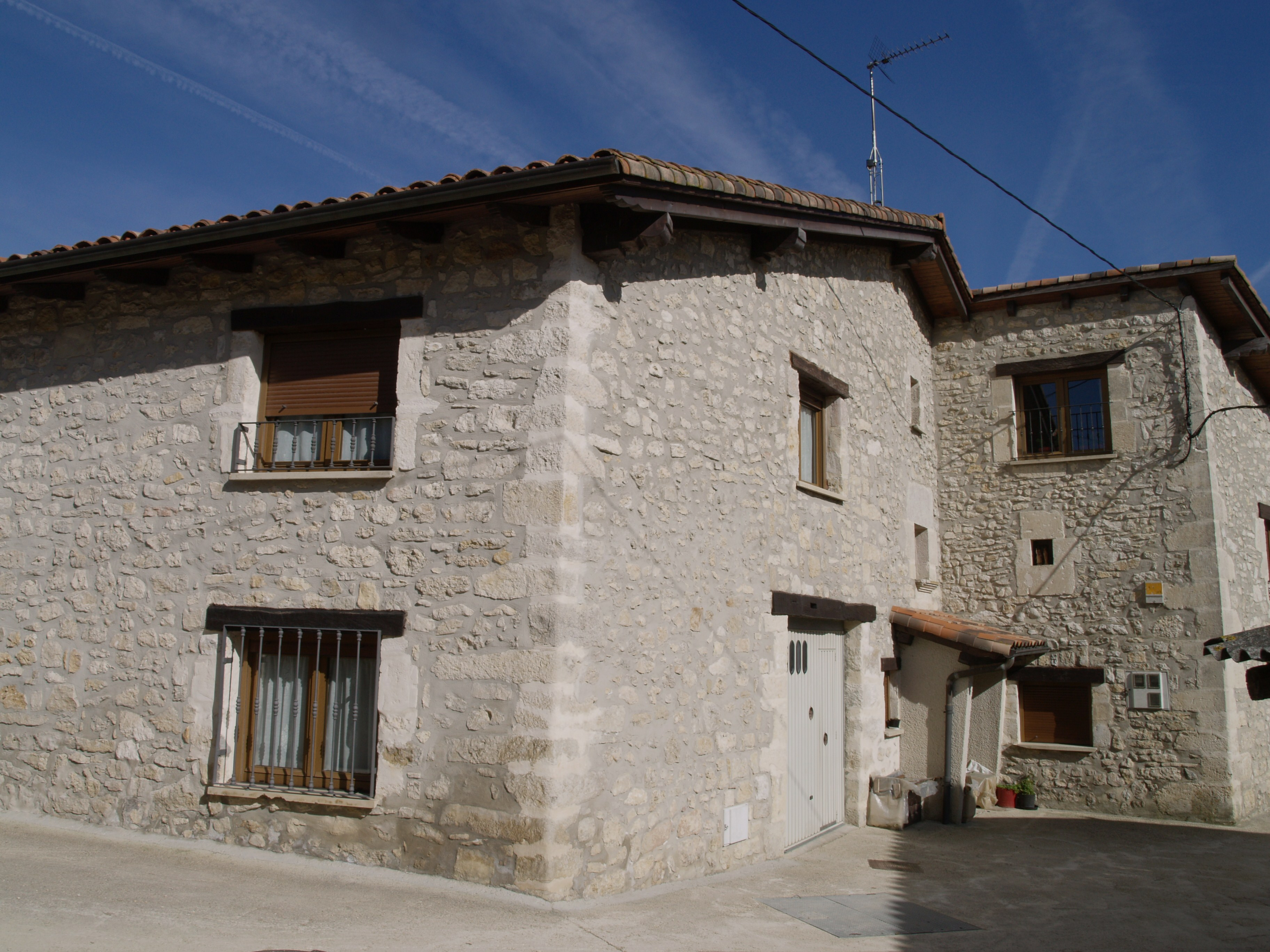

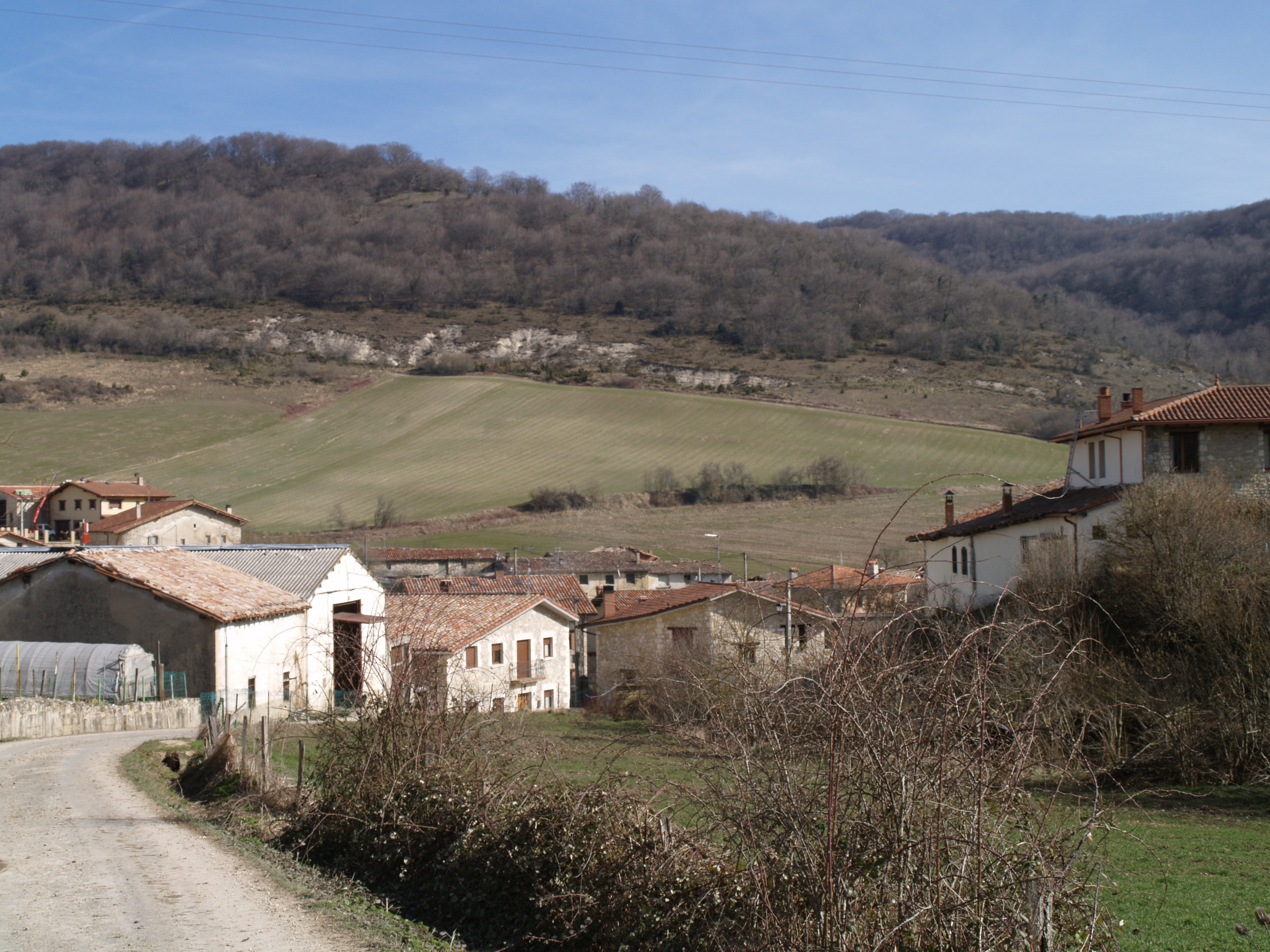

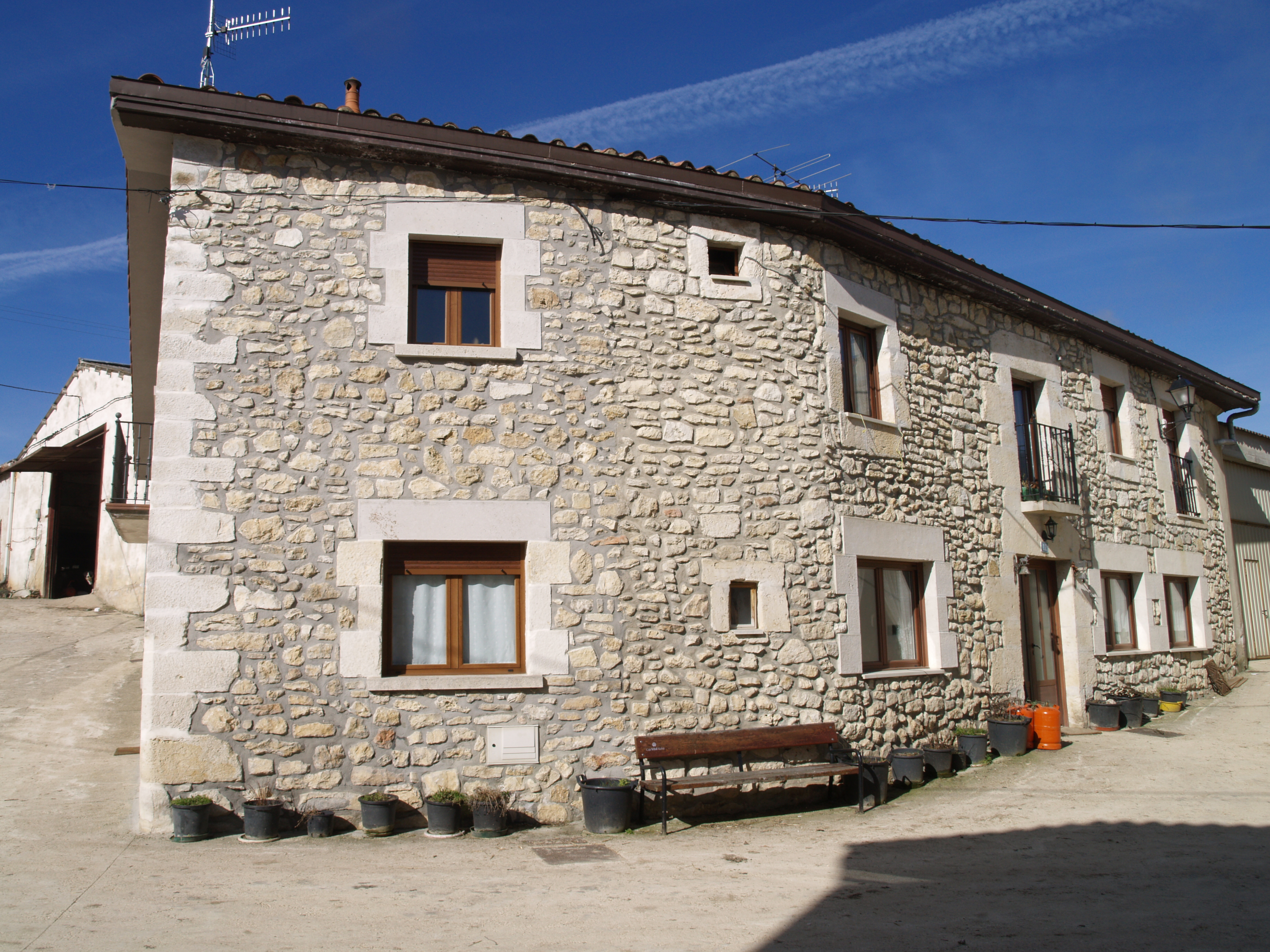

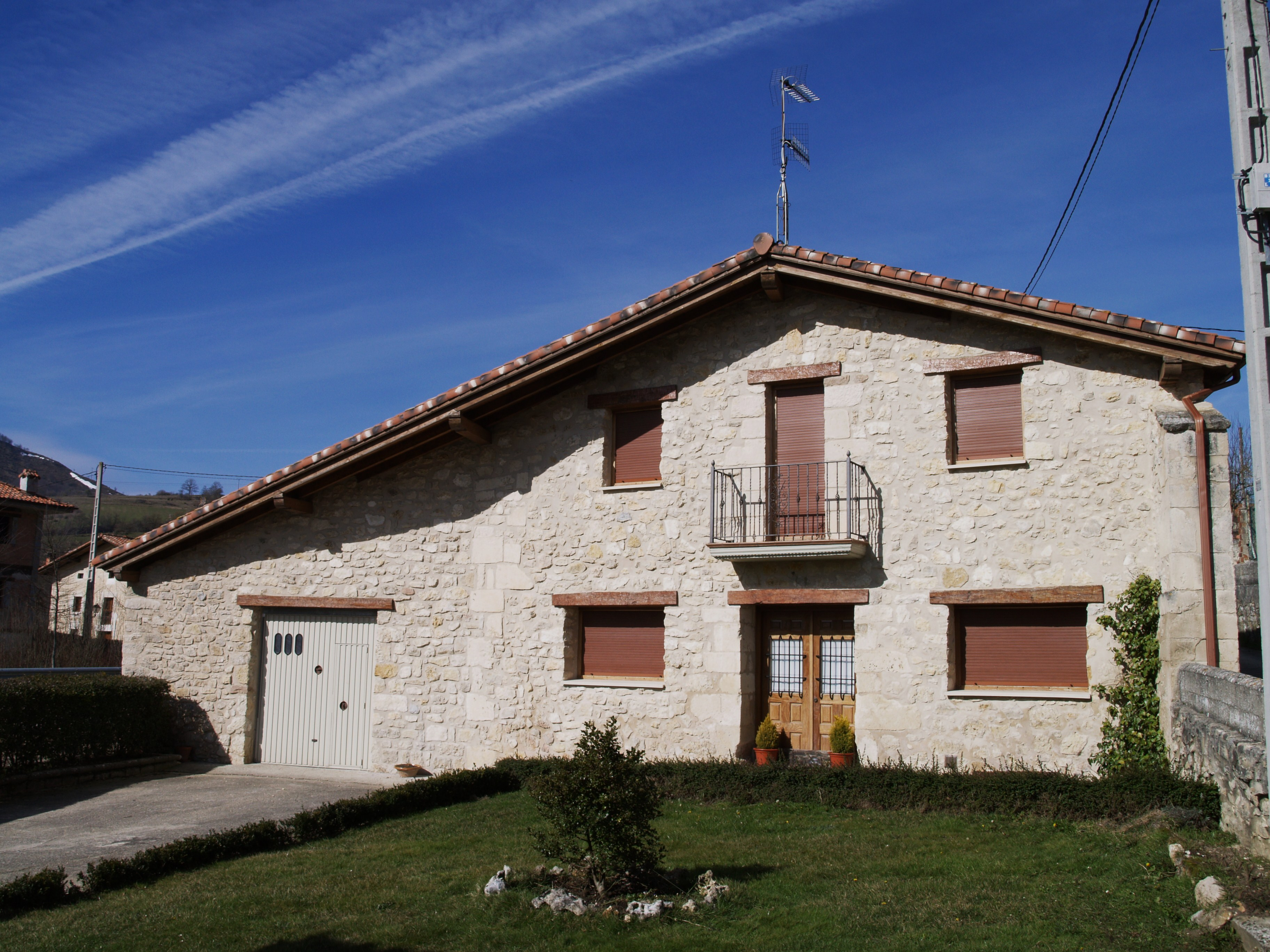

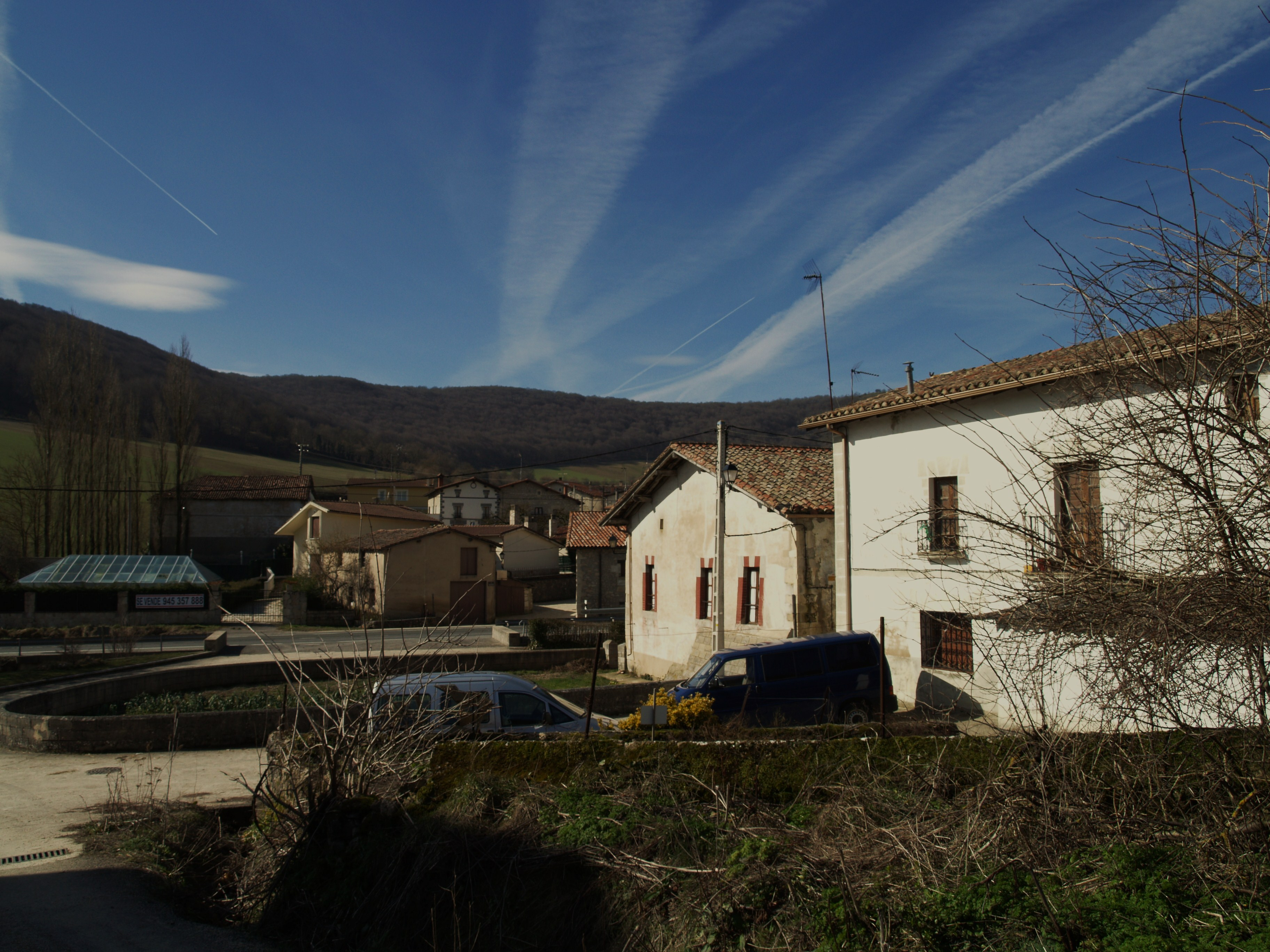

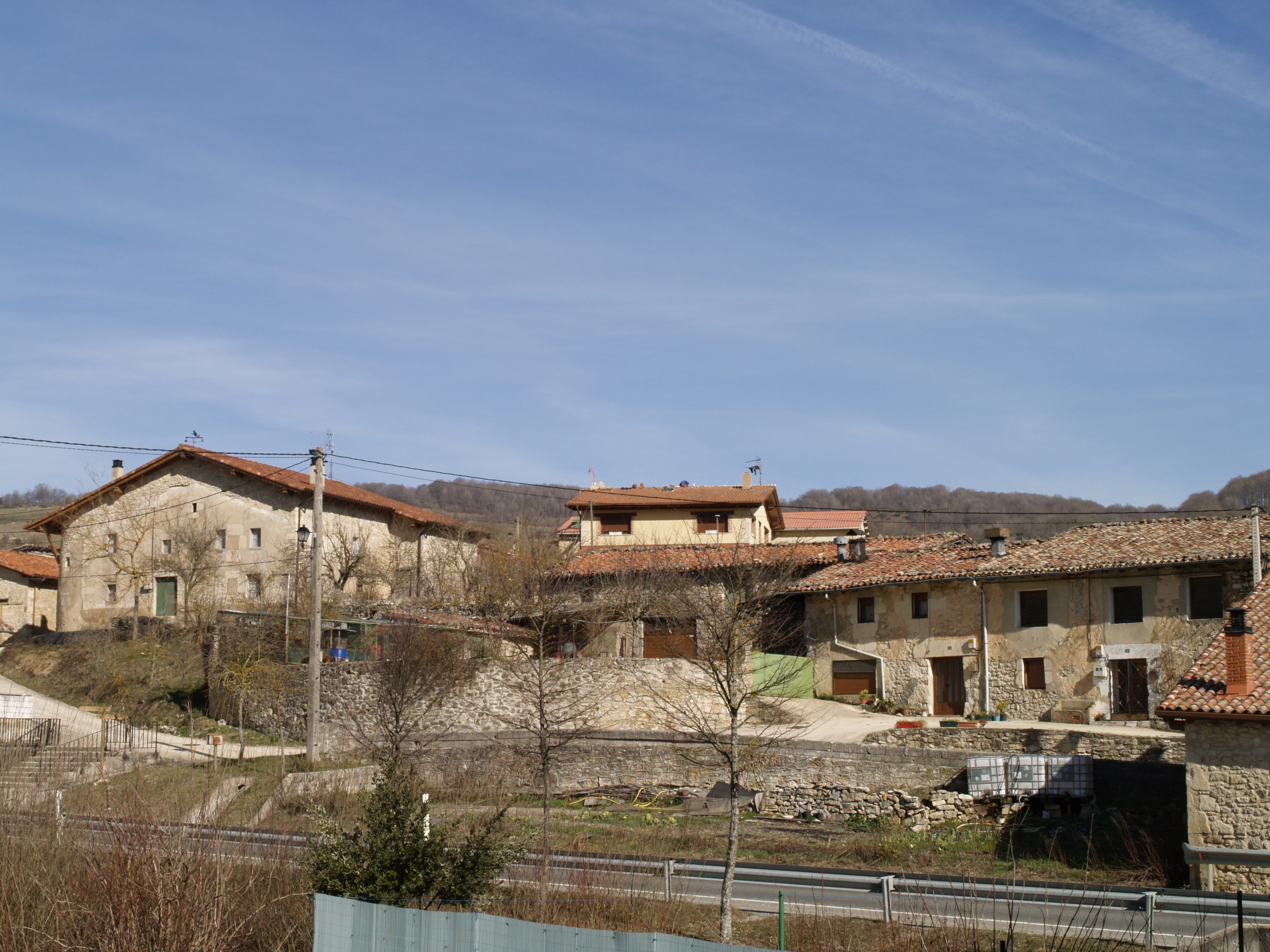
View of the eastern area of the village

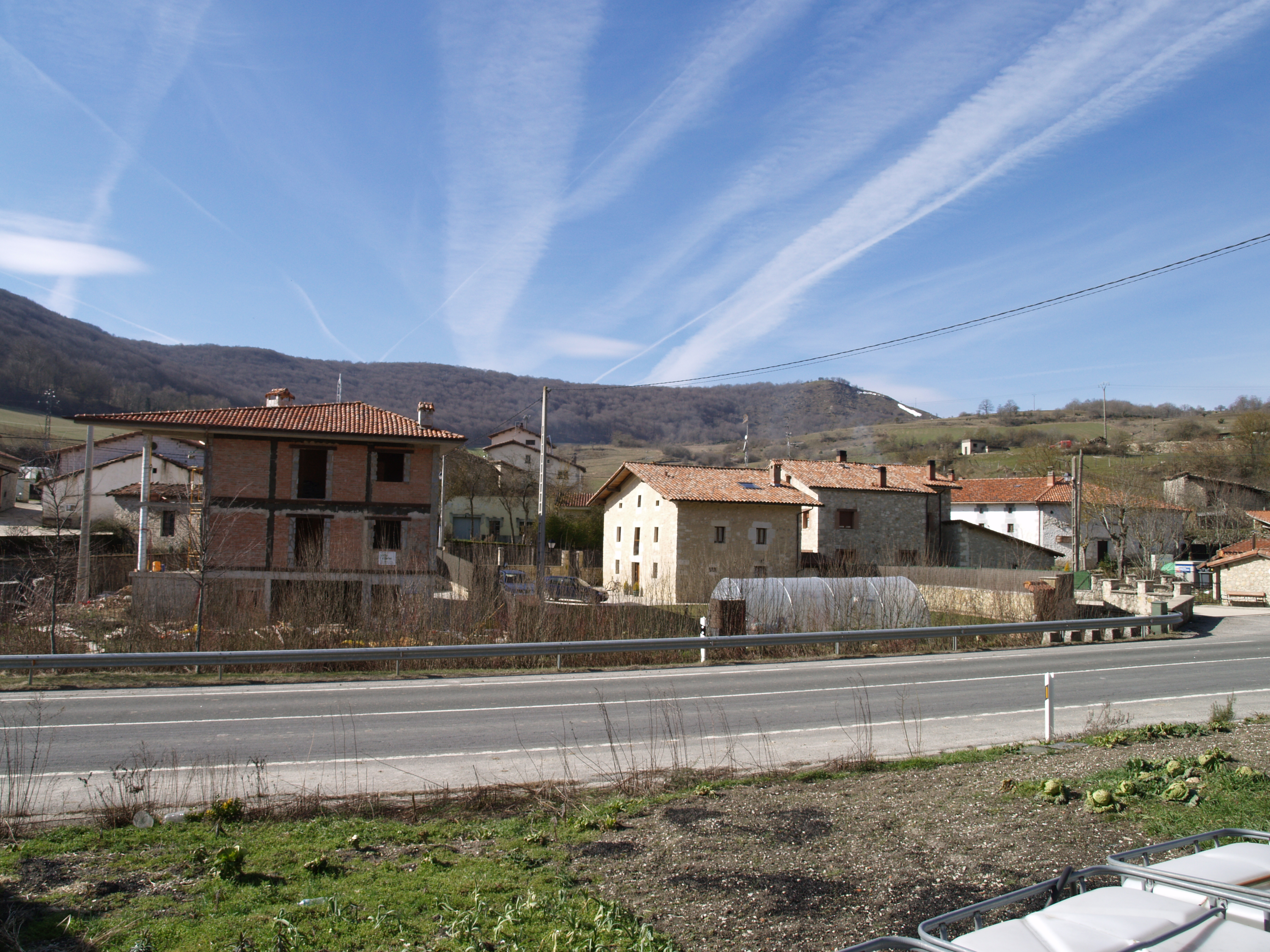
Western view of the village

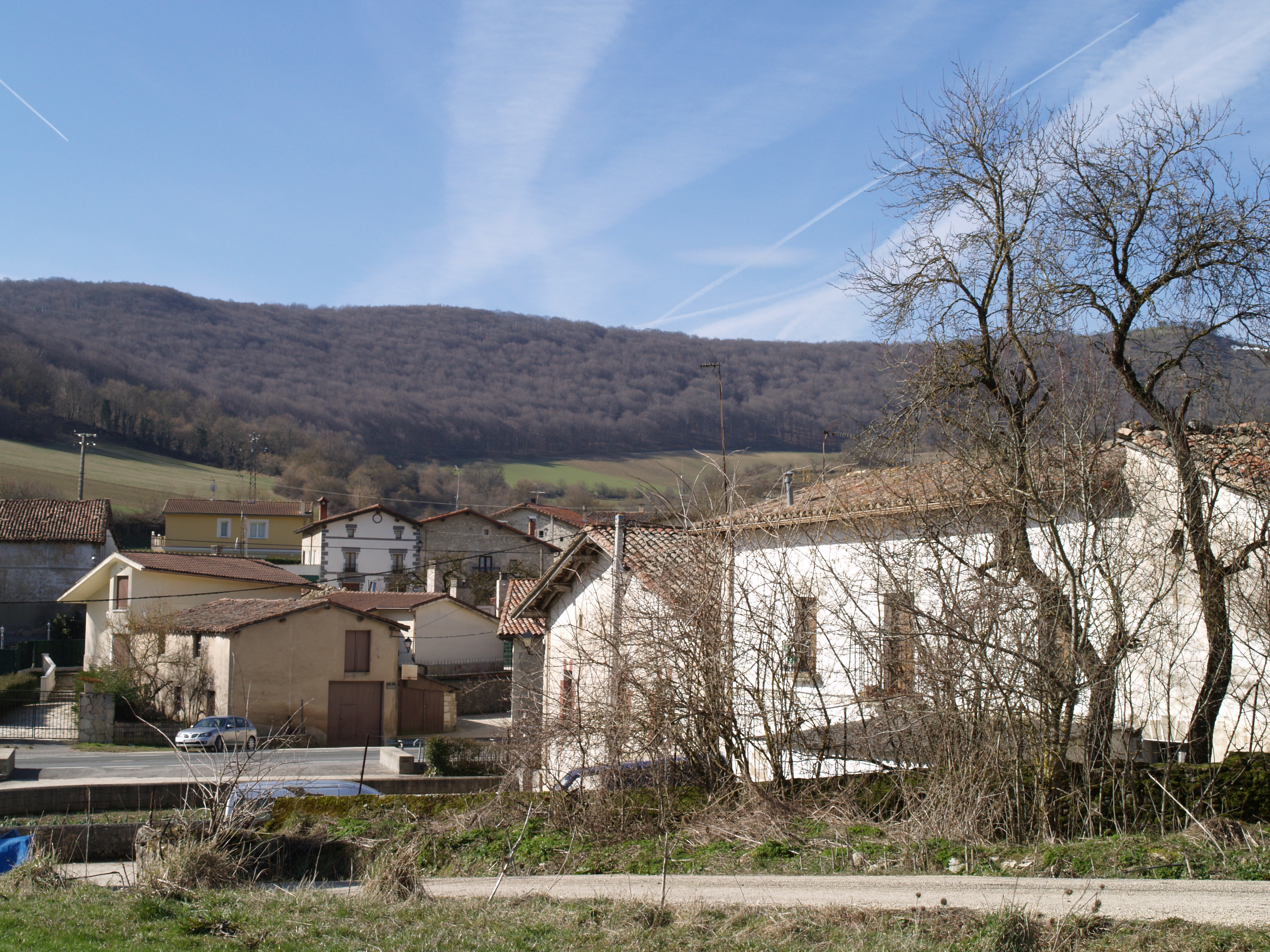
Both sides of the highway

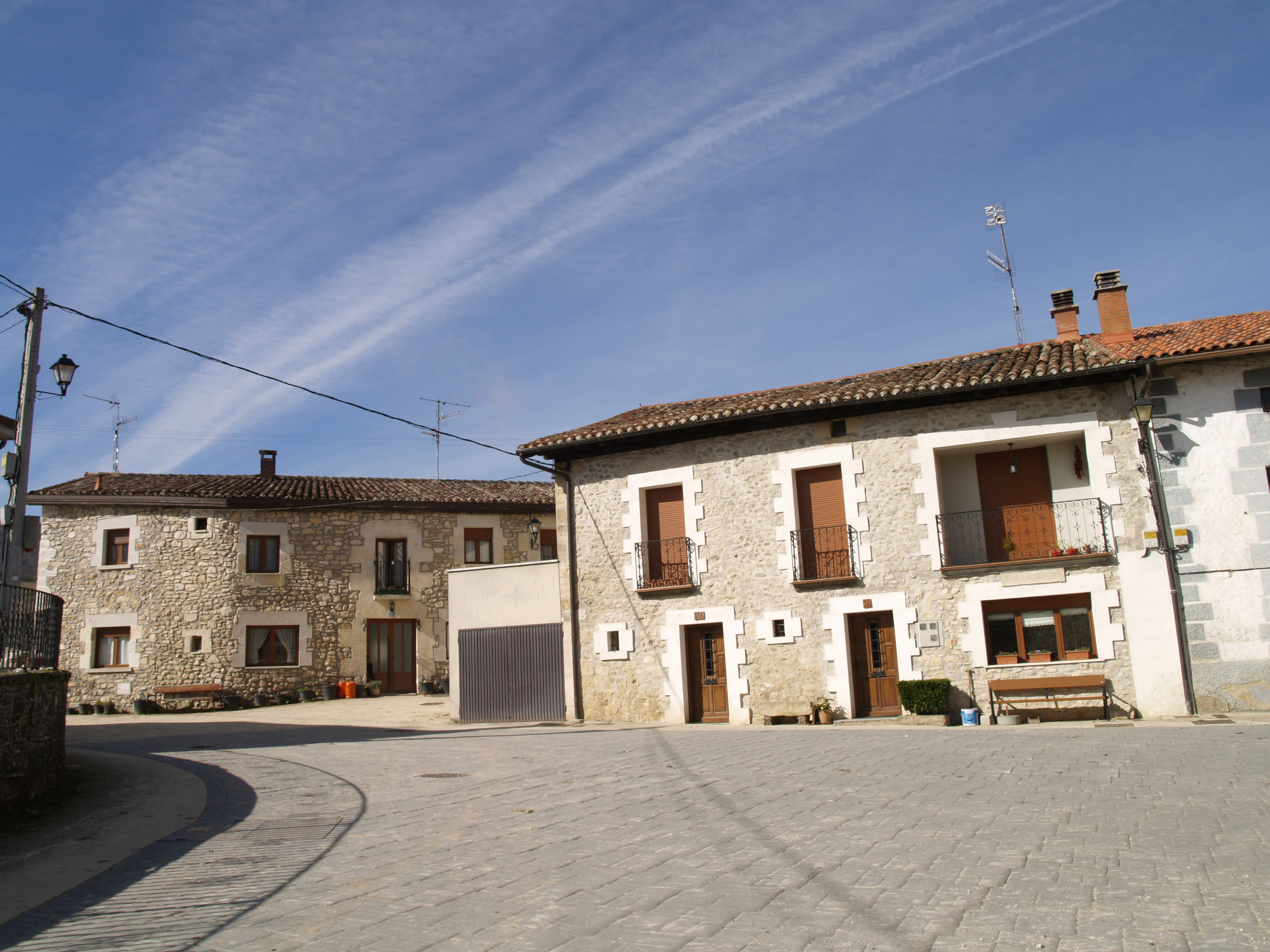
Partial view of the town center

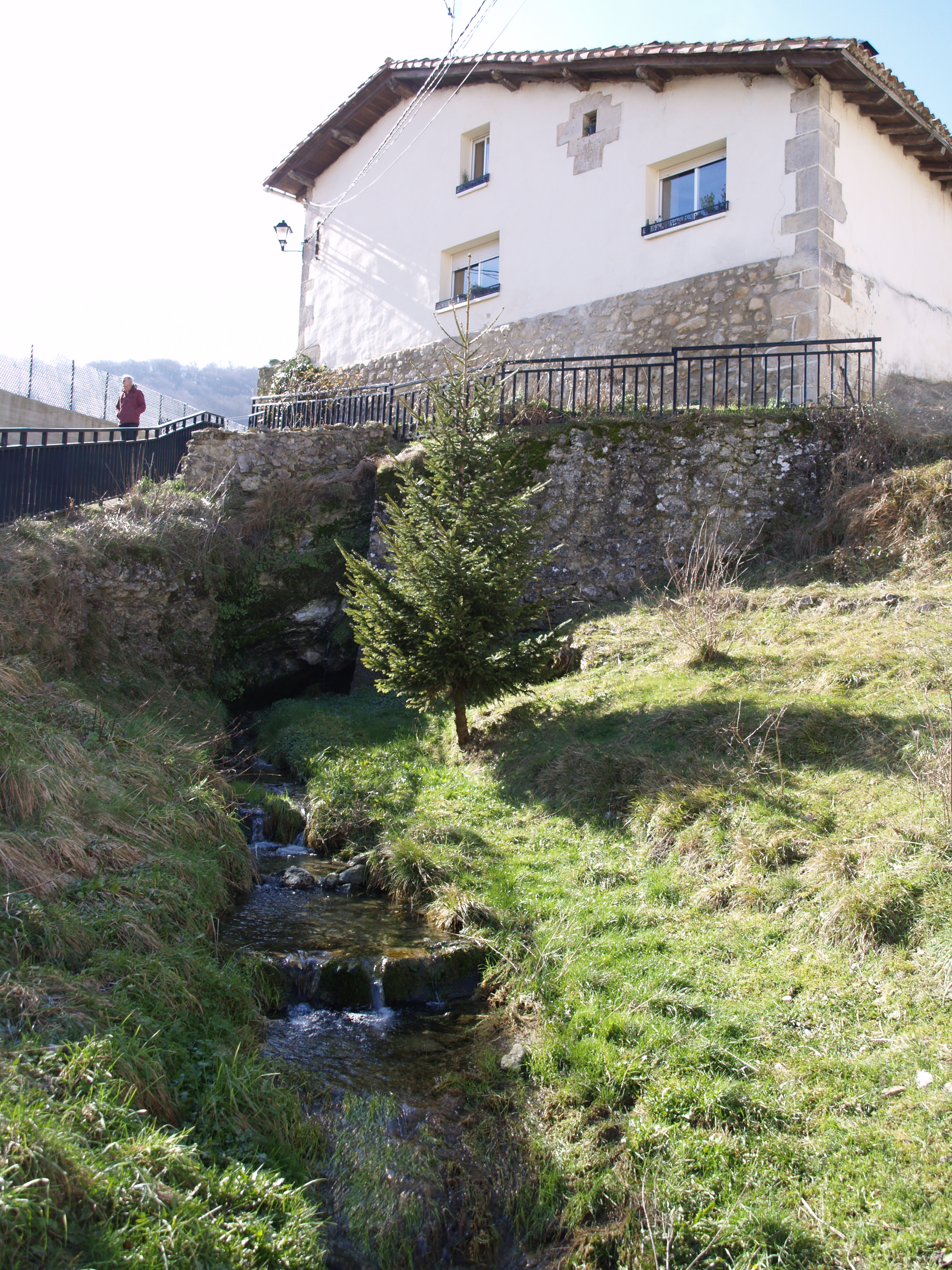
Manantial Ebro

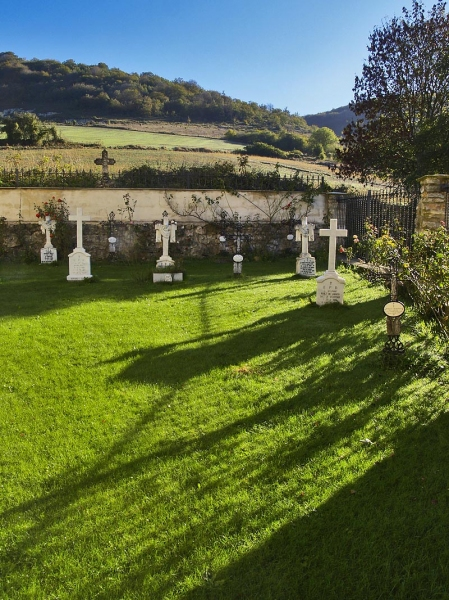
Cemetery in the village

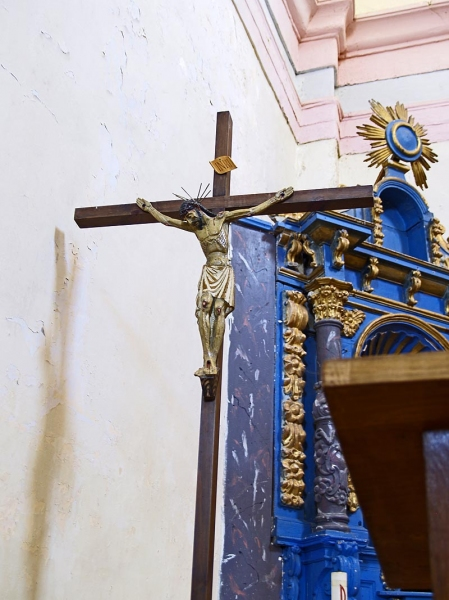
Christ crucified next to the altar of the Virgin of Rosary

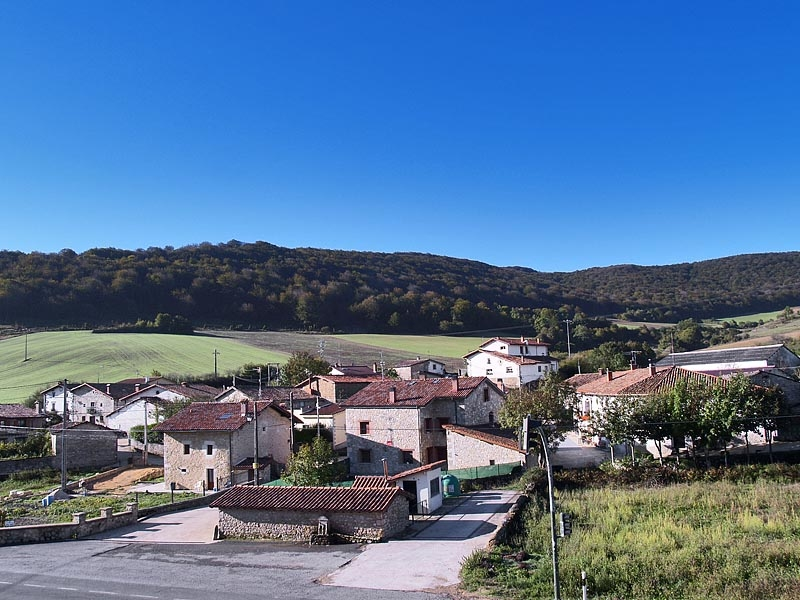

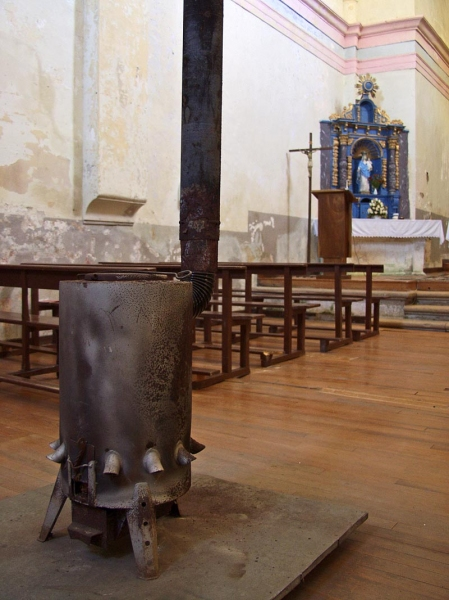

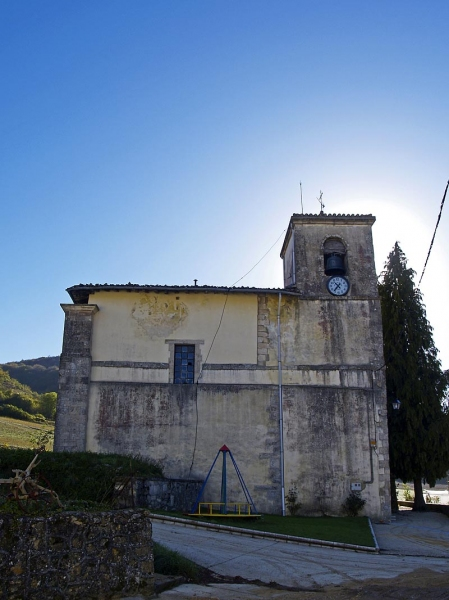
Northern exterior of the church

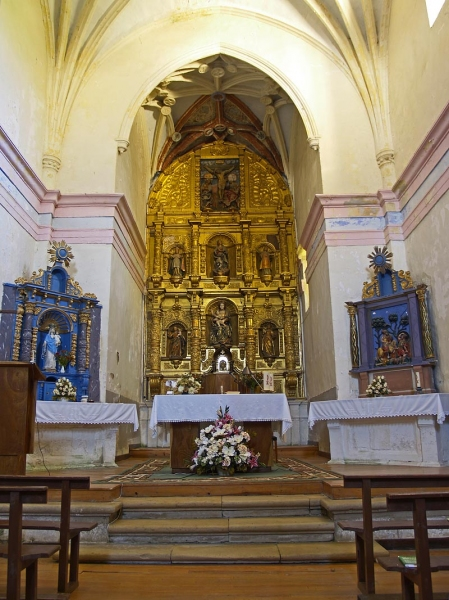
Interior of the church with the central altarpiece

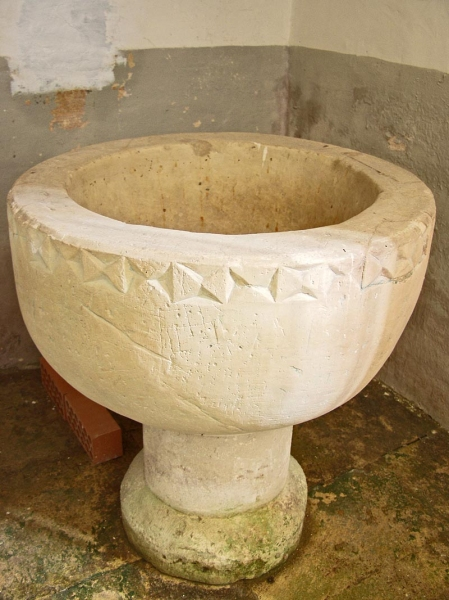
Baptismal font in a corner at the back of the church

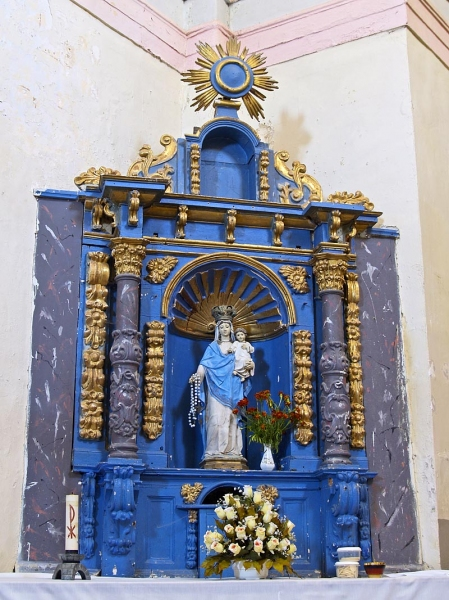
Altarpiece and altar of the Virgin of the Rosary

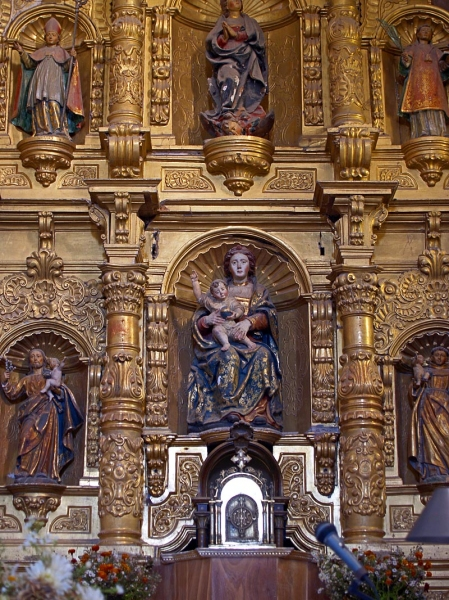
Altarpiece and image of the Nativity of Our Lady

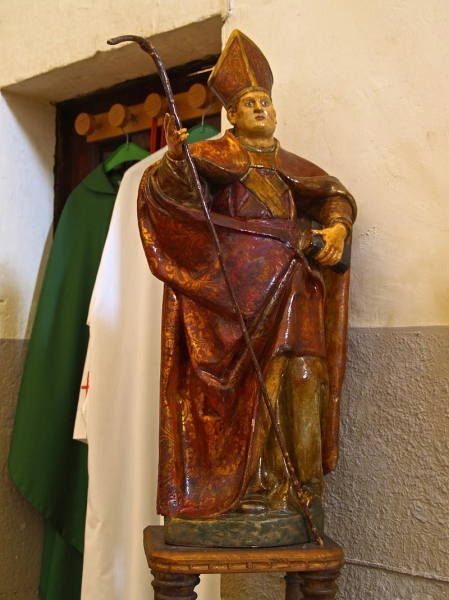
Santo Toribio, former patron of Azazeta
