= List of people executed by Francoist Spain =

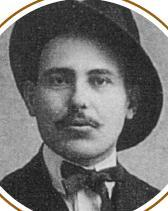
Lorenzo Aguirre, painter.

Many notable people were executed during Francoist Spain. In the history of Spain, the White Terror (Spanish: Terror Blanco; also known as the Francoist Repression, la Represión franquista) describes the political repression, including executions and rapes, which were carried out by the Nationalist faction during the Spanish Civil War (1936–1939), as well as during the following years of the regime of General Francisco Franco. In the 1936–1975 period, Francoist Spain had many officially designated enemies: Loyalists to the Second Spanish Republic (1931–1939), Liberals, socialists of different stripes, Protestants, intellectuals, homosexual people, Freemasons, Romanis, Jews, Black people, immigrants, Basque, Catalan, Andalusian and Galician nationalists.

This is a list of notable people executed during the period of "Francoist Spain":

== A ==
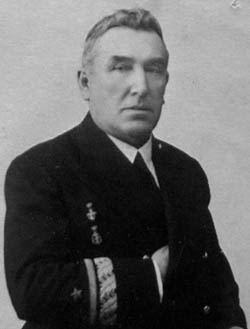
Admiral Antonio Azarola y Gresillón

- Manuel Acero
- Ramón Acín
- Lorenzo Aguirre
- José Alarcón
- Otilio Alba Polo
- Mariano Albert Reigada
- Nicasio Álvarez de Sotomayor
- Melecio Álvarez Garrido
- David Álvarez Flores
- Ricardo Amor Nuño Pérez
- Benigno Andrade
- José Aranguren, General of the Guardia Civil
- Bernabé Argüelles de Paz
- Francesc Arín
- Luis Arráez Martínez
- Guillermo Ascanio
- Antonio Azarola y Gresillón, rear admiral of the Spanish Republican Navy

== B ==
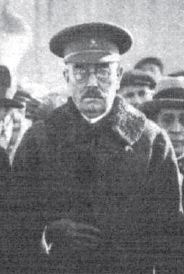
General Domingo Batet

- Eduardo Barriobero y Herrán
- Domingo Batet, General of the Spanish Republican Army
- Feliciano Benito Anaya
- Celestí Boada
- Neus Bouza Gil
- Alexandre Bóveda

== C ==
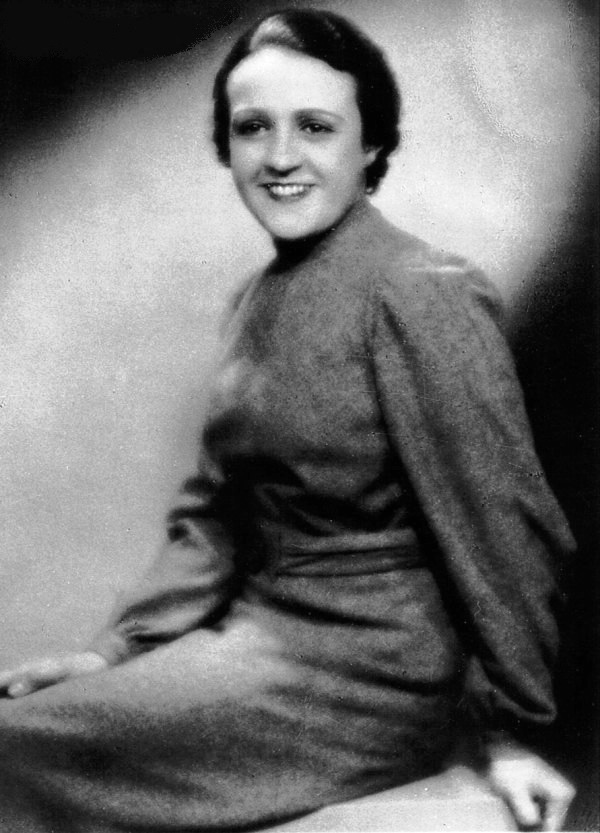
Juana Capdevielle, educator

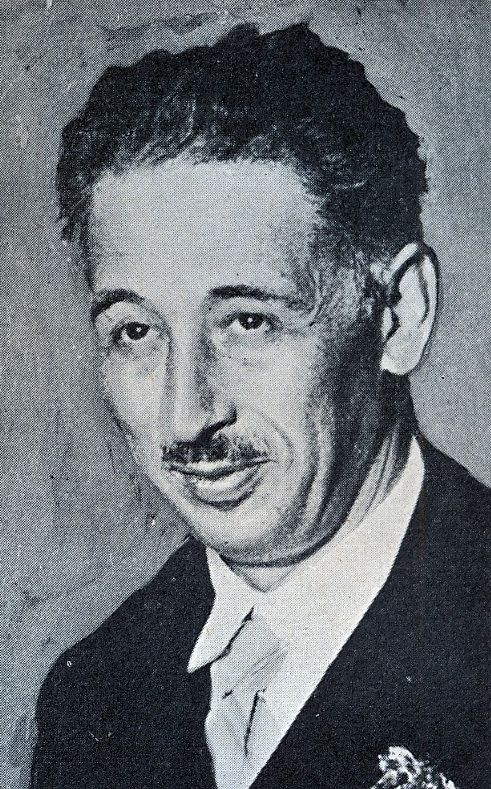
Lluís Companys, President of Generalitat de Catalunya

- Juana Capdevielle
- Manuel Carrasco Formiguera
- Ángel Carrasco Nolasco
- Higinio Carrocera Mortera
- José Cazorla Maure
- Lluís Companys, president of Generalitat de Catalunya

== D ==
- Carmelo Delgado Delgado
- Camilo Díaz Baliño
- José María Díaz y Díaz Villaamil
- Isidoro Diéguez Dueñas
- María Domínguez Remón
- Pedro Durruti

== E ==
- Antonio Escobar Huertas, General of the Republican Army
- Etelvino Vega

== F ==
- Josep Lluís i Facerias
- Baldomero Fernández Ladreda

== G ==
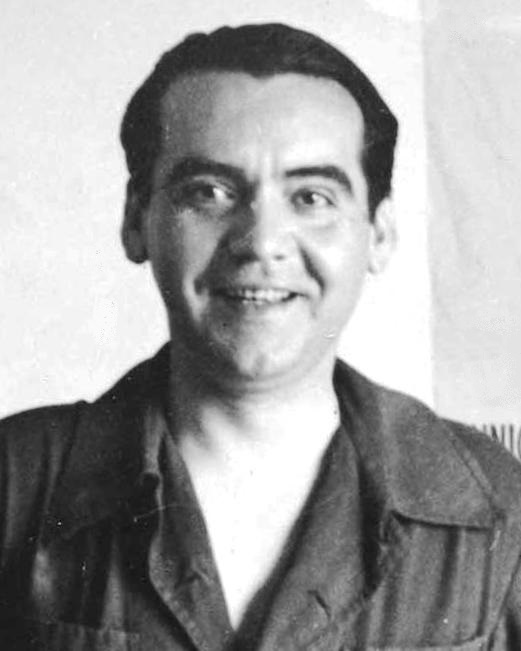
Federico García Lorca, poet and theatre director

- Antonio Gan Vargas
- Cristino García Granda
- Federico García Lorca
- Rosendo García Montesinos
- Maria Garcia Sanchis
- Teodoro González de Zárate, mayor of Vitoria
- Julián Grimau
- Rafael Gutiérrez Caro

== H ==
- Miguel Hernández, poet

== I ==
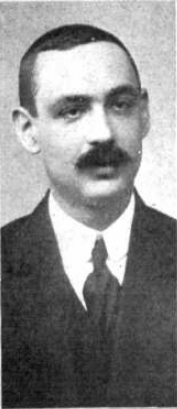
Blas Infante, jurist and Andalusian nationalist

- Blas Infante

== J ==
- María la Jabalina
- José María Jarabo, spree killer

== L ==
- Maravillas Lamberto
- Jesús Larrañaga
- Emilio Leciguyena
- José María León Jiménez
- Virgilio Leret Ruiz
- Tomás López da Torre
- Domingo López Torres
- María Lozano Hernández
- Carmen Luna Alcázar

== M ==
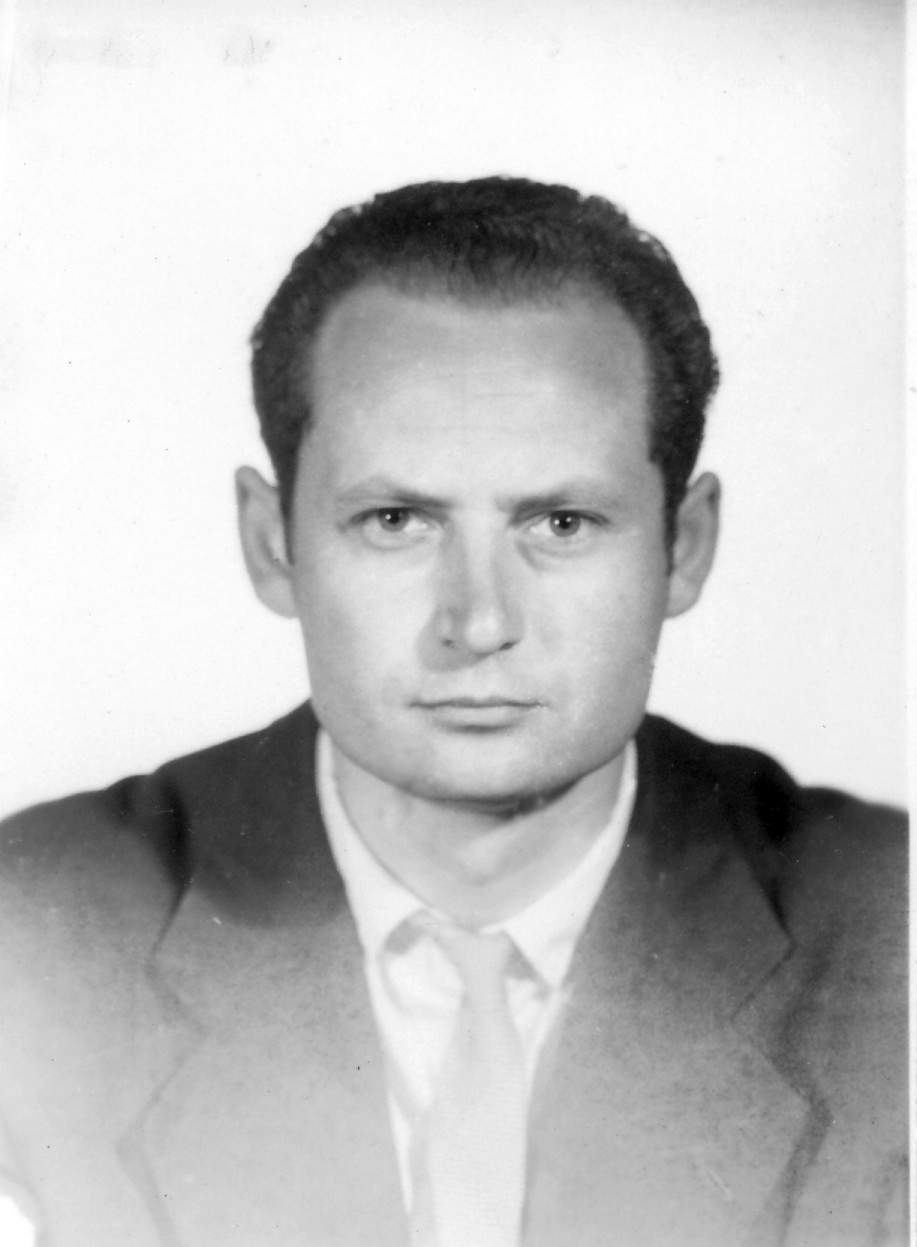
Manuel Moreno Barranco, novelist

- Francisco Maroto del Ojo
- Toribio Martínez Cabrera, General of the Republican Army
- Eustakio Mendizábal Benito
- Manuel Merino, at the Cortijo del Enjembraero
- Manuel Moreno Barranco
- Manuel Muñoz Martínez

== N ==
- José Neira Jarabo

== P ==
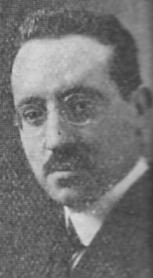
Juan Peset, doctor and university professor

- Esteve Pallarols
- Joan Peiró
- José Pellicer Gandía
- Juan Peset
- Isaac Puente
- Salvador Puig Antich

== R ==
- Cayetano Redondo

== S ==
- Matilde Sabaté Grisó
- Francesc Sabaté Llopart
- Felipe Sandoval
- José Sánchez Gómez, El Timbalero
- Juan José Santa Cruz
- José Carlos Schwartz
- Maria Silva Cruz

== T ==
- Las Trece Rosas
- Rafael Torres Escartín

== V ==
- Etelvino Vega
- Ramon Vila Capdevila

== Y ==
- Pablo Yagüe

== Z ==
- Julián Zugazagoitia

== See also ==
- Enforced disappearances in Francoist Spain
