= Baldomero =

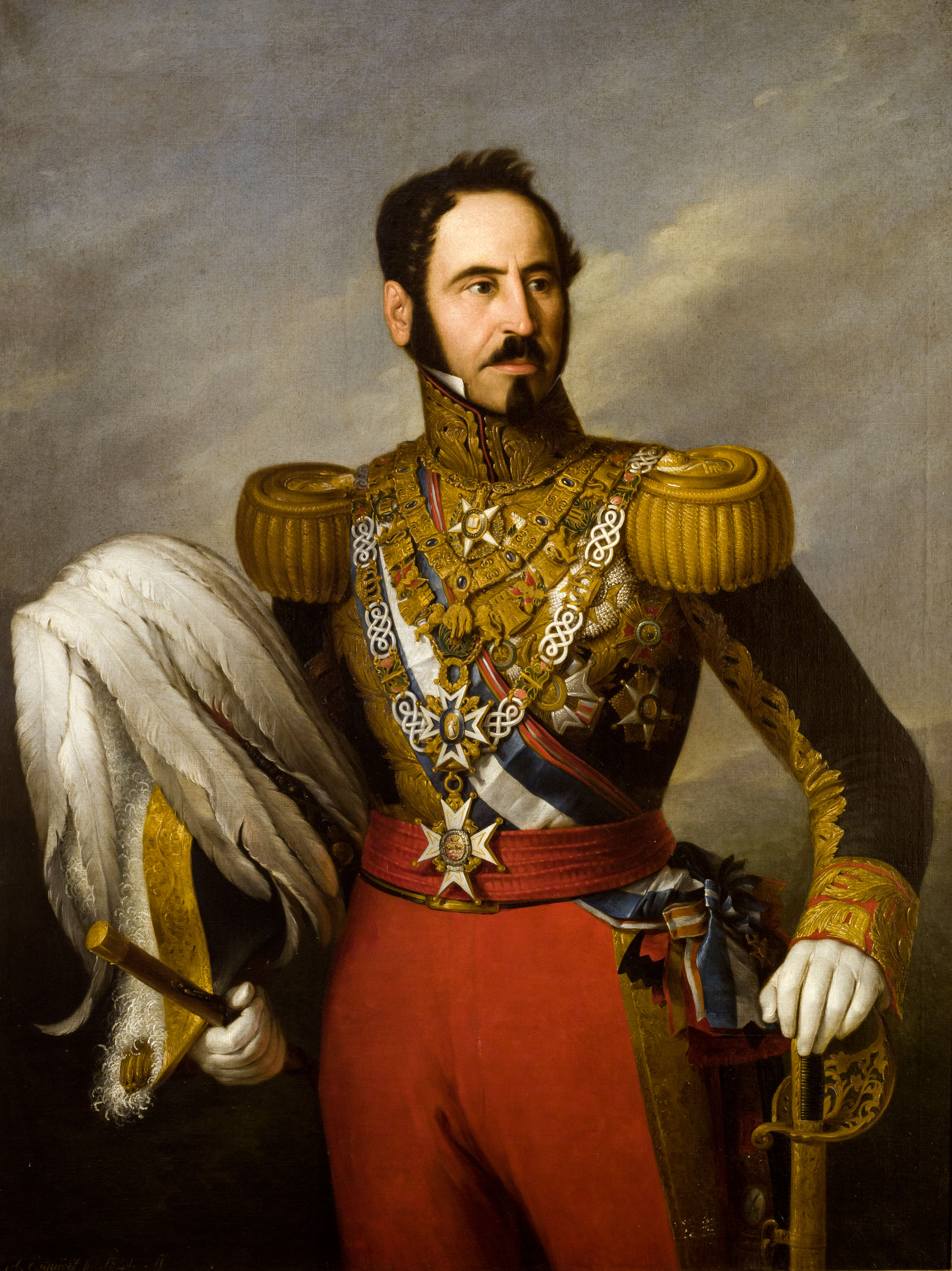
Baldomero Espartero

Baldomero is a given name. Notable people with the name include:

- Baldomero Aguinaldo (1869–1915), a leader of the Philippine Revolution.
  - Baldomero Aguinaldo Shrine
- Baldomero "Mel" Almada Quirós, Mexican baseball player
- Baldomero Amarilla, Paraguayan footballer
- Baldomero Argente, Spanish politician, sociologist, lawyer, economist, writer and journalist
- Baldomero Espartero, Prince of Vergara (1793–1879), a Spanish general and political figure (pictured above).
- Baldomero Falcone, Filipino business consultant and politician
- Baldomero Falcones (born 1946), a chairman and CEO of Fomento de Construcciones y Contratas.
- Baldomero Fernández Ladreda, Spanish politician
- Baldomero Hermoso Herrera, known as Mere, Spanish footballer and manager
- Baldomero Lillo (1867–1923), a Chilean Naturalist author, whose works had social protest as their main theme.
- Baldomero Lopez (1925–1950), a first lieutenant in the United States Marine Corps during the Korean War.
  - USNS 1st Lt. Baldomero Lopez
- Baldomero Olivera (born 1941), a Filipino American chemist known for discovery of many cone snail toxins.
- Baldomero Perlaza, Colombian footballer
- Baldomero Pestana, Spanish photographer, painter, and figurative artist
- Baldomero Rubiera, Cuban gymnast
- Baldomero Sanín Cano (1861–1957), a Colombian essayist, journalist, linguist, humanist and a university professor.
- Baldomero Toledo, Mexican-born American soccer referee
- Dominador Baldomero Bazán, Panamanian politician
- Hugo Baldomero Medina Garza, Mexican drug lord
- Julián Baldomero Acuña Galé, Cuban-born botanist
- Manuel Baldomero Ugarte, Argentine writer and politician

== See also ==
- Saint Baldomerus (French Galmier de Lyon), patron saint of locksmiths, saint's day February 27
- Baldomer
