= José León =

José León or José de León may refer to:

== Arts and entertainment ==
- José León Sánchez (1929–2022), Costa Rican novelist
- Joey de Leon (José María Ramos de León Jr., born 1946), Filipino comedian and actor

== Government and politics ==
- José de León y Echales (died 1699), Spanish governor of Trinidad
- José León Sandoval (fl. 1845–1847), Nicaraguan president
- José María León Jiménez (1893–1936), Spanish politician
- José Antonio León Mendivil (born 1946), Mexican politician
- José Luis León Perea (born 1947), Mexican politician
- José Gaudencio León Castañeda (born 1960), Mexican politician

== Sports ==
- Pepe León (José León Gómez, 1935–2026), Spanish football club chairman
- José Vicente León (1943–1977), Spanish swimmer
- José DeLeón (1960–2024), Dominican baseball pitcher
- José León (baseball) (born 1976), Puerto Rican baseball third baseman
- José De León (born 1992), Puerto Rican baseball pitcher
- José Reynaldo Bencosme de Leon (born 1992), Italian hurdler
- José León (footballer) (born 1995), Spanish football centre-back
- Luis Muñoz (footballer, born 1997) (José Luis Muñoz León, born 1997), Spanish footballer
- José de León (footballer) (born 2004), Spanish-Dominican football winger

== Other ==
- José de León Toral (1900–1929), Mexican Roman Catholic extremist and assassin
- José León Asensio (1934–2024), Dominican businessman

== See also ==
- José León de Carranza Bridge, a steel bridge in Cádiz, Spain
