= Otilio =

Otilio is a given name. Notable people with the name include:

- Otilio Ulate Blanco (1891–1973), President of Costa Rica from 1949 to 1953
- Otilio Galíndez (1935–2009), Venezuelan musician and composer
- Otilio Olguín (1931–1994), Mexican former swimmer and water polo player, competed in the 1952 Summer Olympics
- Otilio Alba Polo (1915–1941), Spanish Catalan politician
- Otilio Montaño Sánchez (1887–1917), Zapatista general during the Mexican Revolution
- Otilio Warrington, known as Bizcocho (born 1944), comedian

== See also ==
- Escuela Preparatoria Tlalpan II "Otilio Montaño", senior high school in San Miguel Topilejo, Tlalpan, Mexico City
- Pepe Gotera y Otilio, Spanish comic characters: two bumbling and disastrous workmen
- Ottiglio
