= Tomás López (disambiguation) =

Tomás López may refer to:

- Tomás López da Torre (1900–1936), Spanish Republican
- Tomás López de Victoria (born 1911), Puerto Rican nationalist
- Tomás López Landero (born 1950), Mexican politician
- Tomás López (Tomás Leónides López) (born 1997), Argentine footballer
