= Manuel Moreno =

Manuel Moreno may refer to:

- Manuel Moreno Barranco (1932–1963), Spanish novelist and short story writer
- Manuel Moreno Fraginals (1920–2001), Cuban historian, visiting professor at the Center for Advanced Studies on Puerto Rico and the Caribbean
- Manuel Moreno Junquera (1956–2011), known as Moraíto Chico II, Spanish Flamenco guitarist
- Manuel Moreno (politician) (1782–1857), Argentine politician
- Manuel Moreno Sánchez (1908–1993), Mexican politician and diplomat
- Manuel Moreno Torres (1912–1980), Mexican engineer (Chicoasén Dam)
- Manuel Moreno (sprinter) (born 1967), Spanish sprinter
- Manuel Belisario Moreno (1856–1917), Ecuadorian writer and priest
- Manuel D. Moreno (1930–2006), American Roman Catholic bishop
