= Juana Capdevielle =

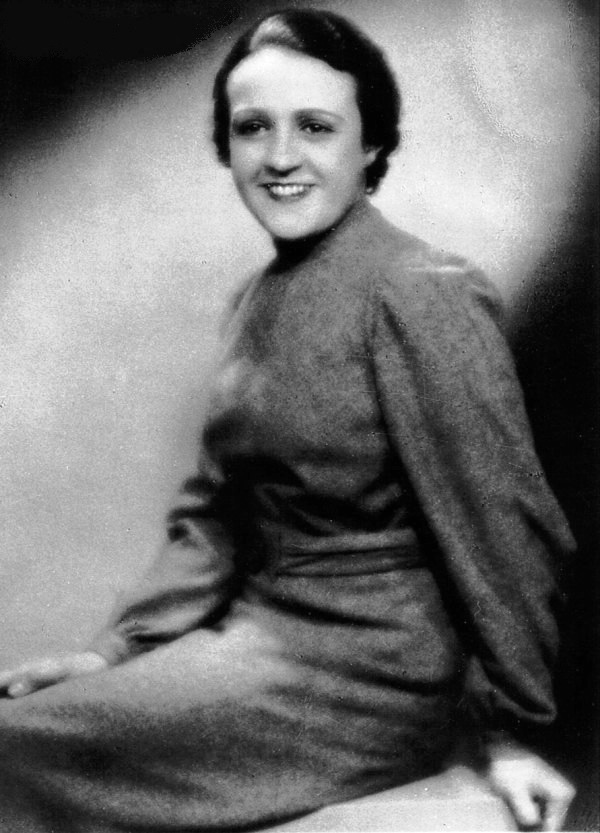
- Born: Juana María Clara Capdevielle San Martín; August 12, 1905; Madrid, Kingdom of Spain
- Died: August 18, 1936 (aged 31); Rábade, Spanish Republic
- Cause of death: Execution by shooting
- Burial place: Rábade cemetery
- Citizenship: French Republic (until 1930); Spanish Republic
- Education: University of Madrid
- Occupations: Librarian, archivist, pedagogue
- Employers: Biblioteca Nacional de España; University of Madrid; Ateneo de Madrid
- Organization(s): Faculty of Archivists, Librarians and Archaeologists
- Spouse: Francisco Pérez Carballo

Juana Capdevielle San Martín (Madrid, 12 August 1905–Rábade, 18 August 1936) was a Spanish educator and librarian.

== Biography ==
Juana Capdevielle studied high school in Pamplona. She obtained her undergraduate degree in Philosophy and Literature at the Central University of Madrid, where she studied under professor José Ortega y Gasset, and was classmates with María Zambrano. She received funding from the Junta para Ampliación de Estudios e Investigaciones Científicas (JAE) to continue her studies in Germany, Belgium, France, and Switzerland. She worked at the university library in the faculty where she studied, as well as at the library of the Ateneo de Madrid. Along with Roberto Novoa Santos, Pío Baroja, and Ramón J. Sender, she presented at the first Spanish Congress on sexual pedagogy in 1934.

She married Francisco Pérez Carballo, lawyer and politician, in 1934 and they moved to Galicia. After the triumph of the Popular Front, her husband was appointed governor of La Coruña. Her husband was arrested and shot on July 24 by the rebel military, during the Spanish coup of July 1936, at the beginning of the Spanish Civil War. Unaware of her husband's assassination, Juana Capdevielle called the Government looking for information about her husband. She was informed that she would be picked up to be taken to him. Instead, she was arrested and jailed. While in prison, she learnt about her husband's death, shot on July 24 at Punta Herminia, near the Tower of Hercules. At the time, she was pregnant, but had an abortion when she learned that her husband had been murdered.

Capdevielle was released in early August and took shelter in Vilaboa (Culleredo) at the house of Victorino Veiga, representative of the Republican Left. While she was there, she received an order of deportation, which she was unable to fulfill as she was arrested once again by the Guardia Civil on August 17th and some Phalangists raped her and then killed her. She was shot at kilometer 526 of the N-VI highway. The following day, her body was found near Rábade, in Lugo.

== Librarian career ==
On 9 July, 1930, she joined the Faculty of Archivists, Librarians, and Archeologists, at first as an adjunct to the National Library of Spain and, as of July 1931, to the Library of the Faculty of Philosophy and Literature at the University of Madrid. She became the first woman in charge of a library at a Spanish university, in 1933. While in that role, she coordinated the transfer of important collections from previously scattered university units into the new facilities at the University City of Madrid.

In 1933, she also got the technical chief at the Ateneo de Madrid, one of the most prestigious private libraries of the country. In the spring of 1936, at the request of Capdevielle, the theatre company La Barraca made their last performance of Lope de Vega's The Knight of Olmedo.

Among her other professional contributions, in 1934 she organized a book circulation service for patients at the Hospital Clínico San Carlos, and the Red Cross. Capdevielle played an active role in the foundation of the Association of Librarians and Bibliographers of Spain, where she served as a treasurer, and she assisted with the adoption and implementation of the Universal Decimal Classification in Spanish librarianship, which at the time was innovative and only limited in use in Catalan libraries. She had grant funds from the Junta para Ampliación de Estudios e Investigaciones Científicas (JAE) to carry out that work, which was interrupted due to her assassination.

In 1933, Capdevielle participated in the first Spanish Conference on Eugenics, between 21 April and 10 May, where she presented the paper The problem of love in the university setting.

== See also ==
- List of people executed by Francoist Spain
- White Terror (Spain)
