= Paul del Rio =

Venezuelan painter

- Born: Paul del Río Canales; 1943; Havana, Cuba
- Died: April 5, 2015 (aged 72); Caracas, Venezuela
- Other names: Máximo Canales (guerrilla pseudonym), URBA (cartoonist pseudonym)
- Known for: Painting, sculpture, political art
- Notable work: Mano Mineral (OPEC headquarters, Vienna), Monumento a La Paz (Caracas)
- Style: Modernism, Cubism, Surrealism
- Movement: Social realism, political art

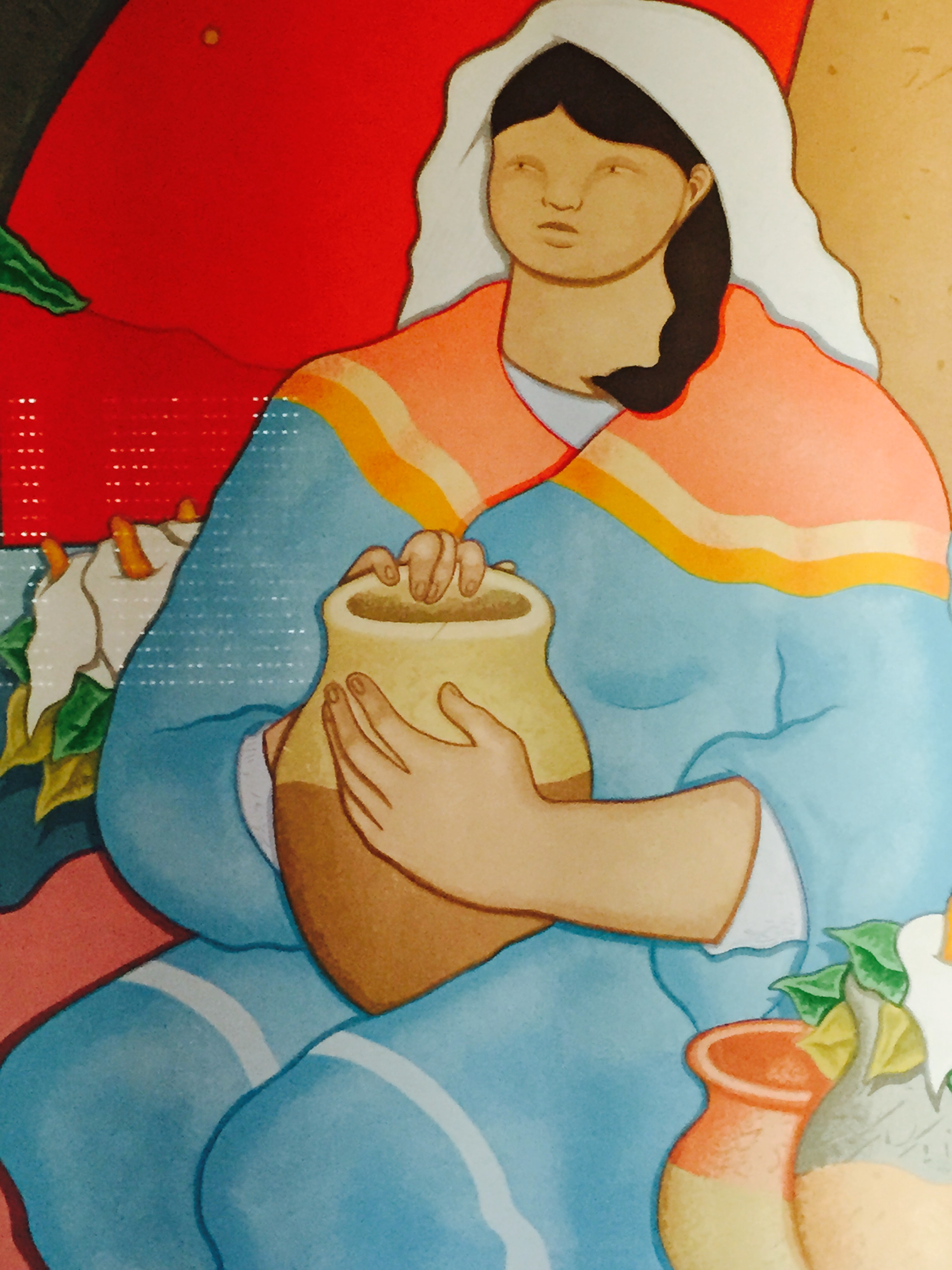
Paul del Río - Woman With Flowers

Paul del Río Canales (1943 – April 5, 2015) was a Venezuelan sculptor, painter and revolutionary. Paul del Rio combined modernism, cubism and surrealism to create enigmatic paintings that are usually a social commentary on the harshness of modern urban life for ordinary people, and their longing for a different life. Originally from Spain, his parents were exiled to France after the fall of the republic and then immigrated to Havana, Cuba where he was born. His family moved once more to Caracas, the capital of Venezuela his second year.

== Guerrilla ==
It was not as an artist but as a MIR (Spanish: Movimiento de Izquierda Revolucionaria) guerrilla that del Rio first came to public notice under the pseudonym Máximo Canales. In 1963 at the age of 19, as leader of a Venezuelan guerrilla group the Armed Forces of National Liberation (in Spanish: Fuerzas Armadas de Liberación Nacional, FALN), along with Wisman Medina and Jose Romulo Nino they seized the Venezuelan cargo ship Anzoátegui (2/13/1963). The ship evaded both the U.S. Navy and Royal Navy for eleven days before docking safely at Belém coast of Brazil.

Six months later, del Rio kidnapped Argentine football player star Alfredo Di Stefano at gunpoint from the Potomac Hotel in Caracas while his team, Real Madrid, were on a pre-season tour of South America (8/24/1963). The kidnapping was codenamed "Julian Grimau", after the Spanish communist Julián Grimau García was executed by firing squad in Spain that April during Francisco Franco's dictatorship. Di Stefano was released unharmed two days later close to the Spanish embassy, without a ransom being paid. The FALN had intended to use the kidnapping to bring international attention on the repressive government of Romulo Betancourt. Di Stefano played in a match against São Paulo F.C. the day after and received a standing ovation in the Olympic Stadium.

A Spanish movie entitled "Real, La Película" ("Real, The Movie") which recounted these events was released on August 25, 2005. In a bizarre publicity stunt at the premiere, del Rio and Di Stefano were brought together for the first time in the 42 years since the abduction.

== Artist ==
In 1966, del Rio began to make political cartoons under the pseudonym "URBA", and gradually began to find alternate means of expressing his political views through art. In 1975, he recovered his Venezuelan nationality which had been stripped from his entire family by President Rómulo Betancourt (administration 1959–1964). The gallery Viva Mexico of Caracas was the first gallery to successfully exhibit his work.

From 1974 to 1993, del Rio exhibited his work in several exhibitions in Spain, Mexico, Finland, Japan, Romania, Colombia, Germany, Canada and Austria. During this period, in 1979 he joined the Sandinista movement in Nicaragua.

In 2000, del Rio designed his bronze sculpture "Mano Mineral" ("Mineral Hand") for the Orden Juan Pablo Pérez Alfonso (Order of Juan Pablo Perez Alfonso), the Venezuelan award of state given to those who contribute to works related to mining, petroleum and energy. The Venezuelan Juan Pablo Pérez Alfonso as minister of mines and hydrocarbons for president Romulo Betancourt was the founder of OPEC, an idea he conceived while exiled in the United States during his review of the Texas Railroad Commission. "Mano Mineral" can be seen outside the OPEC building in Vienna, donated by the Government of Venezuela to the City of Vienna in 2003. The sculpture symbolizes the oil coming from Venezuela. At 2.20 metres high, it is a casting of the emblem of the Second Summit of Heads of State and Government of OPEC Member Countries, which Venezuela hosted in Caracas on September 27–28, 2000. A copy was also unveiled in May 2003 as a monument in Caracas, named "Monumento a La Paz" ("Monument for Peace") near the PDVSA main offices.
