= 133rd Mixed Brigade =

- 133.ª Brigada Mixta
- Active: May 1937–January 1939
- Country: Spain
- Allegiance: (Second Spanish Republic) Republican faction
- Branch: Spanish Republican Army
- Type: Infantry
- Size: Brigade
- Engagements: Spanish Civil War: Battle of Huesca; Zaragoza Offensive; Aragon Offensive; Catalonia Offensive

Commanders
- Notable commanders: Ramón Rodríguez Bosmediano

The 133rd Mixed Brigade was a unit of the Spanish Republican Army that participated in the Spanish Civil War, deployed on the fronts of Aragon, Segre and Catalonia.

== History ==
The unit was created in May 1937, in Barcelona, from former anarchist militias. The command of the 133rd Mixed Brigade went to the militia major Francisco Pardo Sánchez, with Bernabé Argüelles de Paz as commissar and with the militia captain Rafael Martín Piñero as chief of staff. The brigade, which was assigned to the 31st Division of the X Army Corps, was sent on 9 June to the Huesca front, where it took part in the siege operations over the capital of Huesca.

At the end of August 1937, it took part in the Zaragoza Offensive, covering the left flank of the Republican attack - serving as liaison with the 5th cavalry regiment and the 32nd Mixed Brigade commanded by Nilamón Toral. At the end of the fighting, it was assigned to the Noguera Pallaresa area. On 18 April 1938, after the poor performance of the 31st Division at the beginning of the Aragon Offensive, the 133rd Mixed Brigade was dissolved.

Shortly afterwards, a mixed brigade was created that was numbered 133rd, under the command of the anarchist militia major José Logroño Larios. Assigned to the 24th Division of the X Army Corps, the 133rd Mixed Brigade was destined for the Noguera Pallaresa sector, near Llavorsí, where it took part in intense combat against the nationalist forces located in Valadredo and Sellerés. Between 6 and 17 November, two of his battalions participated in the attack on the Serós bridgehead.

In December, the 133rd Mixed Brigade went on to cover the Ebro front, specifically the sector that ran from Garcia to the Mediterranean Sea. (Note: At this time the brigade was attached to the 24th Division, which in turn was attached to the XXIV Army Corps.) On 30 December, after the start of the Catalonia Offensive and faced with the risk of being encircled, the brigade withdrew towards rearguard positions. It was then added to the 43rd Division, with the aim of plugging the nationalist gap that had opened in the Flix sector. However, from 2 January the brigade joined the general retreat, being practically undone upon arrival in Barcelona. Only a few members of the 133rd Mixed Brigade reached the French border.

== Command ==
Commanders

- Militia major Francisco Pardo Sánchez;
- Infantry commander Ramón Rodríguez Bosmediano;
- Militia major José Logroño Larios;

Commissars

- Bernabé Argüelles de Paz, of the CNT;
- Agustín Vidal Roger, of the PSUC;

Chiefs of Staff

- Militia captain Rafael Martín Piñero;
- Militia major Demetrio Arribas;

== Bibliography ==
- Alpert, Michael (1989). El ejército republicano en la guerra civil (in Spanish). Siglo XXI Editores.
- Álvarez, Santiago (1989). Los comisarios políticos en el Ejército Popular de la República (in Spanish). Ediciós do Castro.
- Engel, Carlos (1999). Historia de las Brigadas Mixtas del Ejército Popular de la República (in Spanish). Madrid: Almena. ISBN 84-922644-7-0.
- Martínez Bande, José Manuel (1973). La Gran ofensiva sobre Zaragoza (in Spanish). Madrid: Editorial San Martín.
- Martínez Bande, José Manuel (1979). La Campaña de Cataluña (in Spanish). Madrid: San Martín.
- Zaragoza, Cristóbal (1983). Ejército Popular y Militares de la República, 1936-1939 (in Spanish). Barcelona: Ed. Planeta.
