= Baldomer =

Baldomer is a given name. Notable people with the given name include:

- Baldomer Galofre (1845–1902), Spanish painter
- Baldomer Gili i Roig (1873–1926), Spanish painter, draftsman, and photographer
- Baldomer Lostau i Prats (1846–1896), Spanish politician

== See also ==
- Baldomero
