= Luis Arráez Martínez =

Spanish politician (1897–1940)

Luis Arráez Martínez (1897–1940) was a Spanish Socialist Workers' Party politician. He was born in Almansa. He supported the Second Spanish Republic during the Spanish Civil War. After the victory of the Nationalists, he was executed by the government of Francisco Franco in Alicante.

Preceded by Francisco Rodríguez	civil governor of Málaga; 10 December 1936 – 8 February 1937	Succeeded by Francisco García Alted
