= Domingo López Torres =

Spanish artist and writer (1910–1937)

Domingo López Torres (1910—1937) was a Canarian painter, writer, and poet. Born to a very poor family in Santa Cruz de Tenerife, he became an autodidact and convinced Marxist, playing a large role in the development of revolutionary intellectualism in the Canary Islands.

He published incendiary articles in various labor publications, such as La Tarde and Gaceta del Arte. Many of his writings linked Surrealism to Marxism. In 1930, he founded the cultural, ideological, and political journal Cartones. In 1935, he opened a bookstore-tobacconist's shop, which became a meeting place for the far left of the Canarian political and literary elite.

At the outbreak of the Spanish Civil War, he was one of the first to be apprehended. He was imprisoned at a Nationalist concentration camp in 1937. This overcrowded prison had been a former Fyffes warehouse where bananas had been stored. He was executed by being wrapped in a canvas sack and thrown into the ocean.

== Works ==
López Torres wrote two books:

- Diario de un sol de verano (1929); published in 1987.
- Lo imprevisto (1936); book of poetry; published in 1981
