= David Álvarez Flores =

Spanish illustrator and caricaturist (1900-1940)

David Álvarez Flores (1900 – 20 July 1940) was a Spanish engraver. Flores supported the Second Spanish Republic during the Spanish Civil War. After the Nationalist victory, Flores was executed by the government of Francisco Franco in Madrid.

== Biography ==
David Álvarez Flores was born in Madrid and grew up in Tolosa where he began his career as a cartoonist.
