= Rosendo García Montesinos =

Spanish politician

Rosendo García Montesinos (died 16 November 1939) was a Spanish alcalde and supporter of the Second Spanish Republic during the Spanish Civil War. He was executed by the government of Francisco Franco after the Nationalist victory.
