= Manuel Acero =

Spanish politician

Manuel Acero Montoro (1875 – 4 November 1939) was a politician of the Second Spanish Republic. He was from Baeza. After the Nationalist victory in the Spanish Civil War, he was executed by the Francoist State.
