= Matilde Sabaté Grisó =

Spanish educator and anarchist

- Born: 1904; Reus, Baix Camp, Spain
- Died: 28 June 1940 (aged 35–36); Girona, Catalonia, Spain
- Cause of death: Execution by firing squad
- Occupation: Teacher
- Years active: 1936–1939

Matilde Sabaté Grisó (1904 – 28 June 1940) was a Catalan anarcho-syndicalist, militiawoman and teacher. She was the second woman to be summarily court-martialled and shot in Girona and one of 17 women executed in Catalonia by Francoist Spain.

== Biography ==
Born in Reus in 1904, she was the daughter of Marc Sabaté and Madrona Grisó. In the 1920s, her brother Pere, a railway worker like her father, was transferred to Sils, in the region of Selva, and she decided to accompany him. A dressmaker by profession, once she settled down she began a relationship with José Soto Cortés, a railway brigade worker affiliated to the Unión General de Trabajadores (UGT) who, at the outbreak of the Spanish Civil War, became president of the Revolutionary Committee of Sils. Matilde joined the Confederación Nacional del Trabajo (CNT) and became a militia member. Later, the New Unified School Council (CNEU) appointed her as a kindergarten teacher.

The victory of the Nationalists brought harsh repression against the Republicans. Disregarding the advice of her companion, Matilde refused to go into exile. On 27 February 1939 she was arrested and taken to prison in Girona. Subjected to a summary court martial, on 21 February 1940, she was accused of joining the revolution, of being secretary of the revolutionary committee in Sils, of being armed and dressed as a militiawoman, of having participated in the looting and destruction of places of worship, and of being a witness to murders. On 28 June 1940, she and nine others were sentenced to death, shot on the wall of the Girona cemetery and buried in a mass grave. She was 36 years old.

== See also ==
- Anarchism in Spain
