= Teodoro González de Zárate =

Spanish politician (1881–1937)

Mayor of Vitoria
- In office 22 February 1936 – July 1936
- Preceded by: Manuel Díaz de Junguitu
- Succeeded by: Tomás Alfaro
- In office 5 June 1931 – 3 September 1934
- Succeeded by: Luis Ginés Ostolaza

Personal details
- Born: 9 November 1881 Vitoria, Álava, Spain
- Died: 31 March 1937 (aged 55) Azazeta pass, Álava, Spain
- Party: Republican Left
- Other political affiliations: Autonomous Republican Party (before 1934)

Teodoro González de Zárate Sáenz (9 November 1881 – 31 March 1937) was a Spanish politician who served as mayor of Vitoria during the Second Spanish Republic. He was killed by Francoist forces during the Spanish Civil War.

== Biography ==
Born in Vitoria, Teodoro González de Zárate had been a businessman before entering politics. He was elected to the city council in April 1931. In the election, right-wing candidates won a majority in the city council (16 seats, compared to the 15 seats held by republicans and socialists). However, the partial annulment of the results and subsequent election rerun gave a majority to the left. On June 5, González de Zárate was named mayor. The republican members of the city council had been elected on the Autonomous Republican Party ticket. This was a local organization, and most of them joined other republican parties starting in August 1931. González de Zárate, who served as president of the party, later joined Republican Left.

As mayor, González de Zárate criticized the 1931 proposal for a Basque statute of autonomy on the basis that it would harm the economic model of Álava, he also described it as an imposition from rural politicians against urban areas. However, he campaigned in favor of the 1933 proposed statue of autonomy. In August 1934, the city council elected a commission to defend the Basque Economic Agreement against a government initiative to reduce taxes on wine, which would have led to a significant reduction in tax revenue for the municipal government. On September 3, the government dismissed the councilmen who had taken part in the election of the commission. Luis Ginés Ostolaza, a Radical Republican, was elected mayor the next day. Ginés Ostolaza resigned in December, being replaced as mayor by Manuel Díaz de Junguitu.

After the 1936 general election, the government reinstated the city council elected in 1931 and González de Zárate was reelected as mayor. He was succeed on an interim basis by Tomás Alfaro, who held the mayorship briefly during July 1936 before being deposed in the aftermath of the coup that led to the Spanish Civil War. Teodoro González de Zárate was arrested on September 17 by Requetés. On March 31, 1937, coinciding with the start of the Biscay Campaign, González de Zárate and other 15 prisoners were taken out of prison in order to be executed on orders of Emilio Mola. They were killed on the night of March 31–April 1 in the Azazeta pass.
