= María Pérez Lacruz =

Spanish anarchist militant (1917-1942)

María Pérez Lacruz La Jabalina
- Born: 3 May 1917; Teruel, Aragon, Spain
- Died: 8 August 1942 (aged 25); Paterna, València, Spain
- Cause of death: Execution by firing squad
- Children: 1
- Military career
- Allegiance: Spanish Republic
- Service: Confederal militias
- Service years: 1936
- Profession: Military nurse
- Unit: Iron Column
- Wars: Spanish Civil War

María Pérez Lacruz (1917–1942), also known by her nickname La Jabalina, was a Spanish militiawoman. Originally from the province of Teruel, she moved to the Valencian city of Sagunt at an early age. There she became involved in the Libertarian Youth and, following the outbreak of the Spanish Civil War, she joined the Iron Column as a military nurse. After being wounded in action, she was transferred to the Provincial Hospital of Valencia, and went to work in an armaments factory after she had recovered. With the Nationalist victory in the civil war, she was arrested, charged with rebellion and imprisoned. She gave birth during her imprisonment and her child was abducted by the Francoist dictatorship. A court martial sentenced her to death and she was executed by firing squad; she became the last woman to be executed by the dictatorship. Since the passage of the Historical Memory Law in 2007, her life has been covered in various artistic mediums.

== Biography ==
María Pérez Lacruz was born in the Aragonese city of Teruel, on 3 May 1917, to Manuel Pérez and Isabel Lacruz. She was nicknamed La Jabalina, due to her family's origins in the small village of Jabaloyas. In 1923, her family moved to the Valencian city of Sagunt to look for work. Pérez Lacruz and her siblings were forced to work from a young age to support their family. Pérez Lacruz herself worked as a housecleaner. Following the proclamation of the Second Spanish Republic, in 1934, Pérez Lacruz joined the Libertarian Youth. When the Spanish Civil War broke out in July 1936, she went to Sarrión and joined the Iron Column, an anarchist militia. She worked as a military nurse on the Teruel front, where she opened a field hospital for the militia column. During an offensive against Teruel, on 23 August 1936, she was wounded by a bullet to her leg and transferred to the Provincial Hospital of Valencia. After she was discharged on 24 December 1936, she returned to Sagunt and worked at an armaments factory.

After Sagunt fell to the Nationalists in the final offensive of the Spanish Civil War, on 23 April 1939, Pérez Lacruz was arrested by the Civil Guard. The police interrogated her and shaved her hair off, before releasing her. On 31 May, a military tribunal presented the charges against her, accusing her of rebellion and of living a libertine lifestyle, and of having attacked a prison in Castelló. She was also accused of having killed a number of guards, priests and a legislator, as well as two engineers, and a Bolivian consul (despite no Bolivian consulate existing in Valencia at the time). The Provincial Hospital verified that she had been recovering from her war wounds at the time of the alleged crimes, but this evidence was disregarded by the tribunal. Pérez Lacruz refused to sign the declaration against her and argued that the charges were based on lies; she was immediately imprisoned.

Her health deteriorated in prison, threatening her pregnancy, and on 4 November 1939, she was transferred to the Provincial Hospital. After she gave birth on 9 January 1940, her child was immediately taken away from her and she never saw them again. Valencian historian Ricard Vinyes estimated that the Francoist dictatorship abducted up to 30,000 children from imprisoned women. The parent's custody of them forcibly removed, the children were then placed them in orphanages and then re-educated them according to the values of the regime. On 18 January 1940, Pérez Lacruz was transferred to the women's prison in the Convent of Santa Clara, Valencia. Two years later, she was transferred to the provincial women's prison. During her years in prison, she was regularly beaten and tortured, but she never gave up any information to her captors other than that she had been the lover of someone named "Paco el Francés".

On 28 July 1942, a court martial sentenced Pérez Lacruz to capital punishment for rebelling against the National Movement. On 8 August 1942, Pérez Lacruz and six other prisoners were executed by firing squad in the cemetery of Paterna. She was the last woman to be executed by the dictatorship. As of 2020, the fate of her abducted child has not yet been discovered; if alive, they would be in their 80s and would likely be entirely unaware of their true origins. Pérez Lacruz's life has been the focus of a biography by Manuel Girona published in 2007, a novel by Rosana Corral-Márquez published in 2013, and interpreted as a stage play in 2019. As part of a historical memory initiative by the Sagunt city council, in 2022, Cristina Durán and Miquel Àngel Giner published a graphic novel about her life.

== See also ==
- María Lozano Hernández

== Bibliography ==
- Espílez Murciano, Felipe (6 December 2020). "María Pérez Lacruz, la Jabalina". Encima de la Niebla (in Spanish). ISSN 2695-5245.
- Giménez, Miguel (26 June 2021). "María 'La Jabalina', la vida de una miliciana anarquista fusilada por el franquismo se convertirá en un cómic". elDiario.es (in Spanish). ISSN 2530-0199.
- Lajo, Benjamin; Montaner, Rafa (2006). "La Jabalina (The Wild Sow): a Woman Shot for Standing by the Revolution [María Pérez La Cruz of the Iron Column]". KSL: Bulletin of the Kate Sharpley Library (46–47). ISSN 1475-0309.
- Población, Félix (20 August 2020). "The Stolen Child of Francoism's Last Female Shooting Victim, María Pérez Lacruz". El Salto. Translated by Sharkey, Paul. ISSN 2530-5913 – via Kate Sharpley Library.
