= Manuel Moreno Barranco =

Spanish writer

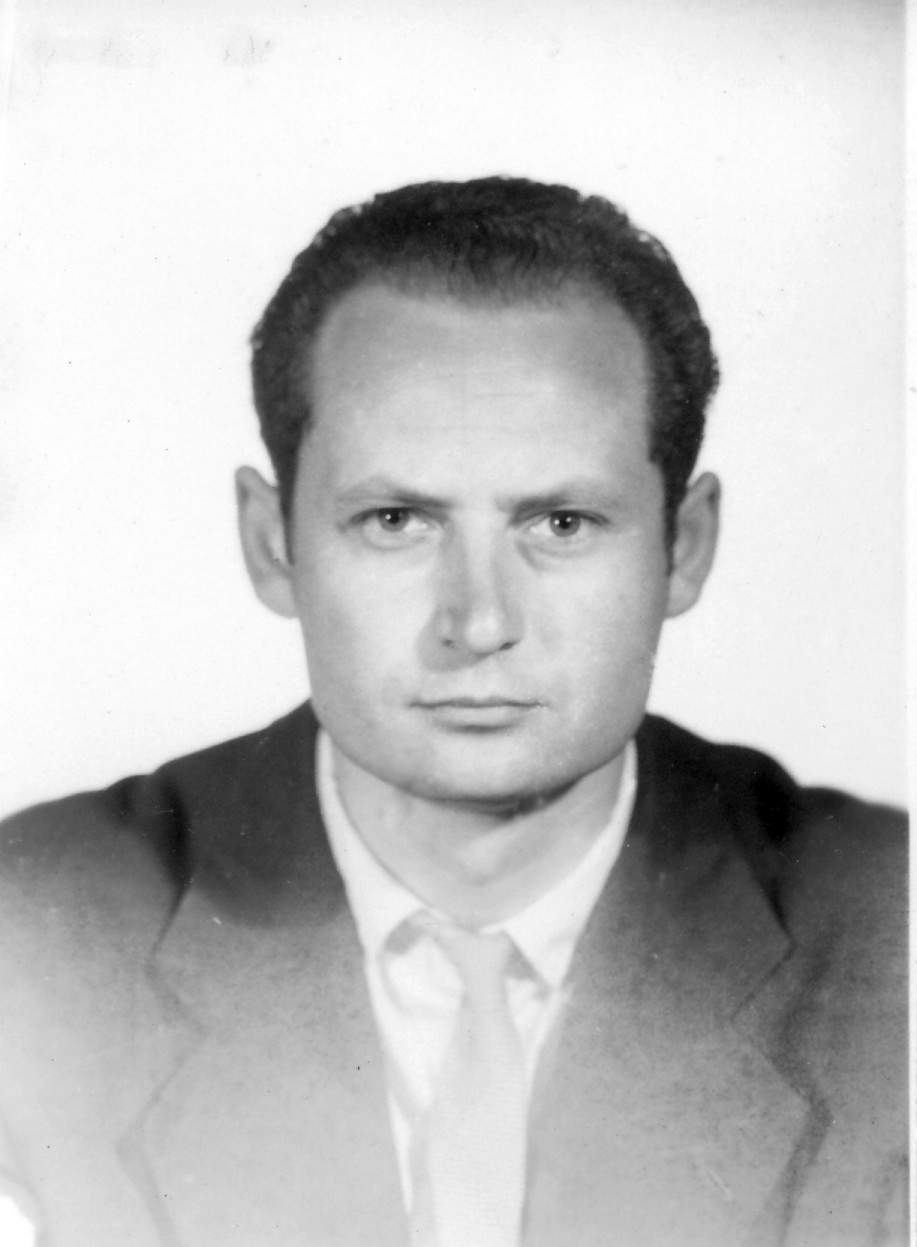
- Manuel Moreno Barranco
- Born: 24 April 1932; Jerez de la Frontera, Spain
- Died: 22 February 1963 (aged 30); Jerez de la Frontera, Spain
- Occupation: Writer
- Writing career
- Language: Spanish

Manuel Moreno Barranco (24 April 1932 – 22 February 1963) was a Spanish novelist and short-story writer, who suffered a violent death at the prison of Jerez de la Frontera in 1963.

== Life ==
Manuel Moreno Barranco was born on 24 April 1932 in Jerez de la Frontera, Spain, to Manuel Moreno and María Luisa Barranco. In August 1936 his father, persecuted by Falangists, left his home and fled to the Republican zone: after some days, there were rumours that he had been executed along with other Republicans at the sierra of Ronda, presumably on their way to Malaga.

Barranco studied Commerce and started working at the Bank of Jerez at the age of 16. Fond of the adventure literature of his time, he collected novels by Emilio Salgari or J. Mallorquí. In 1950 he was diagnosed with tuberculosis, which forced him to resign for over one year. His first literary efforts date from this time. Shortly thereafter, Barranco would finish a few short stories and a novella, which he presented to Editorial Aguilar in 1955. They would be published two years later under the title Revelaciones de un náufrago (Revelations of a Castaway).

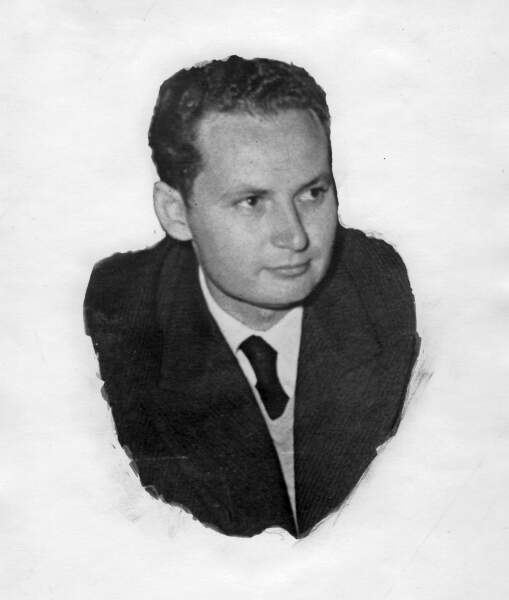
Portrait of Manuel Moreno Barranco, taken around 1960

In October 1956, encouraged by the imminent publication of his book, Barranco requested a leave from the Bank of Jerez and moved to Madrid, looking for a new job. His aim was to build a literary career, something he considered difficult to accomplish given his hometown. He eventually managed to find a position at the Banco Popular Español. In Madrid, he started a novel (Arcadia feliz) and resumed writing short stories. Revelaciones de un náufrago was eventually published in 1957, receiving praise from several critics.

In February 1959, Barranco requested a leave and moved to London, where he worked as an associate editor for the Embassy of Venezuela. Six months later, he travelled around Switzerland and Italy and arrived in Paris with a single pound in his pocket. After an initial period of poverty and menial labour, he found a job at the Agricultural Bank of France and made friends among the Spanish exile community. When he finished his novel Arcadia feliz (Happy Arcade), Juan Goytisolo recommended its publication in Mexico. Although Barranco started a second novel, Bancarios (Bank Clerks), which remained unfinished, his main concern in the last years of his life seems to have been the publication of Arcadia feliz. The work was announced by an anti-Francoist publisher that went bankrupt before it was released. In his Paris years he had a romance with one Suzanne Lacoste, whom he planned to marry. In October 1962 he went on a two-week holiday to Barcelona, where he was informed about a six-month course in Carlos Barral's publishing house. Excited by this proposal, he settled in Molins de Rei and resigned from the Agricultural Bank of France by letter. He allegedly spent two months attempting to join that course; disillusioned and penniless, he returned to Jerez on 24 November 1962.

Barranco spent Christmas in his family house, getting back in touch with his friends in Jerez. As one of them recalls:

after his return to Jerez we met often and talked much. You could feel that he was a communist in our conversations, he didn't say so but he didn't deny it either. You shouldn't trigger malicious gossip back then. In those days Grimau was arrested and almost killed when he was pushed from a window of the General Security Department, just to wind up executed by shooting. Francoist information services were aware of his affiliation and he was under surveillance since he crossed the border.

On 27 January 1963, the police inspected the family house, searching for a pirate radio; they found nothing. Feeling increasingly surveilled, Barranco hid his writing machine and his last writings in a friend's house. This friend reports:

he started writing political pamphlets and cautiously handed them out. One of those leaflets fell into the police's hands. He realized he was persecuted and he thought they could only prove his authorship with his writing machine, which he brought, together with some writings, to my house in order to hide them. At the end of January, they entered his house and couldn't find anything, but they wanted to prove that the writings were his. I was going to get married in a few days--it seems all of his friends were under surveillance. Javier Bellido, a mutual friend, took the writings and hid them in the vaults of the church of San Dionisio, since his brother Luis was its priest; the machine remained here.

Those writings were lost when the church vaults were demolished some years later.

On 13 February 1963, the police inspected the family house again and arrested Barranco. There is no known judiciary mandate, nor was he charged with a formal accusation. Lawyers asked to take the case refused by claiming that it was a "matter of jurisdictional competence". While Barranco was in jail, some police officers used to visit his mother to threaten her. Ten days after his arrest, the family was informed that Barranco had "jumped from the prison balustrade", resulting in serious injury. He was admitted to the hospital of Santa Ana, where he died of a cerebral haemorrhage. Local newspaper Ayer reported the next day that Barranco had fallen from the balustrade, making no mention of his incarceration. The official version was the same as the one offered three months later regarding Julián Grimau: suicide. The Tourism and Information Minister, Manuel Fraga Iribarne, defended the government version in a letter to José Manuel Caballero Bonald, who had signed a manifesto to force the authorities to investigate the incident.

When the warder opened, as usual, the cell occupied by Mr Moreno Barranco, at eight in the morning of February 22, the recluse jumped head first from the balustrade of the corridor located in front of his cell and fell to the yard, and the base of his skull broke.

The other prisoners reportedly did not witness the "suicide". The only witness was the police in charge of the interrogation, who claimed that he was there to inform Barranco of his transfer to Madrid. The case shows many similarities with the defenestration of Julian Grimau, as well as with four police defenestrations suffered by inmates between 1963 and 1969, none of which was admitted by the authorities. The police prevented his mother from seeing her dying son and were present at his funeral, discouraging his own friends from attending. Many dubious rumours spread about the reasons for his arrest, for example, that he was involved in some anti-Francoist conspiracy and that he found his missing father in Paris.

== Legacy ==
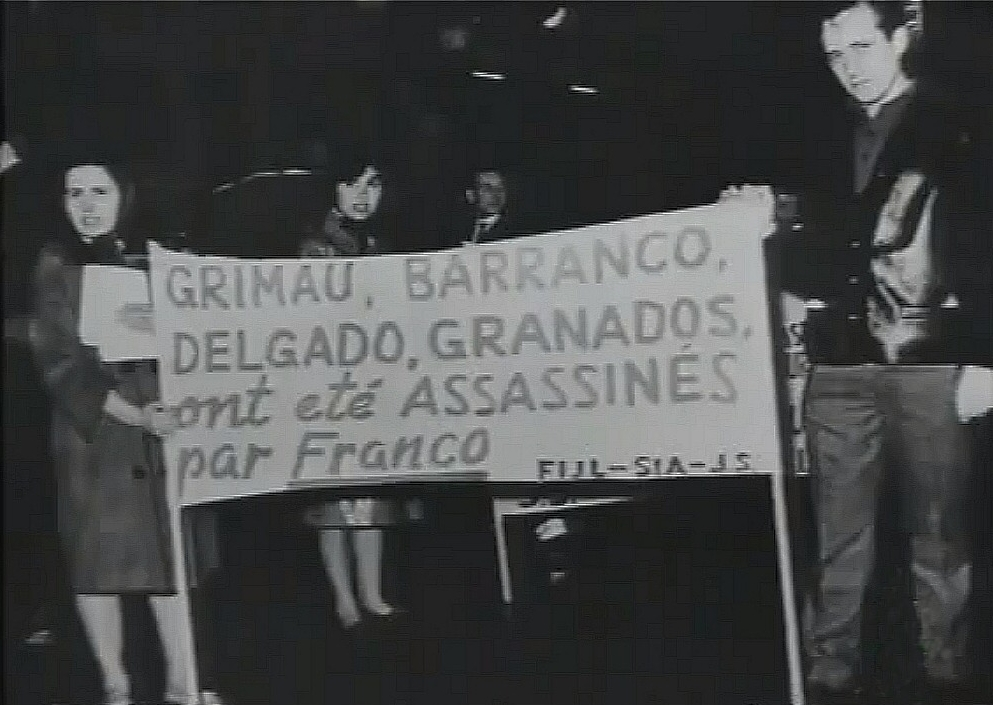
Protest in Paris in 1963 against the murder of Julián Grimau, Manuel Moreno Barranco, Francisco Granados and Joaquín Delgado.

Barranco's death was reported in different parts of the world, often stressing the strange circumstances that surrounded it. Clandestine media within Spain and in the exile also mentioned it.

In France a committee called "Union of Writers on Behalf of the Truth" was formed to cast light on the facts. Some major newspapers in France, England, Mexico and the United States published the news or demanded an explanation.

The poet Pablo Neruda read about it in the Chilean press, and the case was cited in books and university papers of the English-speaking world, as well as in France and the Spanish exile. However, perhaps because Barranco was not openly a member of any political party, the case was soon forgotten. Francoist Spain never carried out an investigation into his death, which remains a mystery to this day.

== See also ==
- List of unsolved murders (1900–1979)

== Bibliography ==
=== Short stories ===
- "Encrucijada" (1955) ("Revelaciones de un náufrago", Editorial Aguilar, Madrid, 1957)
- "Amanecer" (1955) ("Revelaciones de un náufrago", Editorial Aguilar, Madrid, 1957)
- "Sin cuartel" (1955) ("Revelaciones de un náufrago", Editorial Aguilar, Madrid, 1957)
- "Un marido viejo" (1955) (""Revelaciones de un náufrago", Editorial Aguilar, Madrid, 1957)
- "El engaño" (1955) ("Revelaciones de un náufrago", Editorial Aguilar, Madrid, 1957)
- "La muerta" (1956) (unpublished)
- "¡Late, late, corazón de desierto!" (1956) (unpublished)
- "La fuerza del muerto" (1958) (unpublished)
- "El cuarto de baño" (1958) (unpublished)
- "El miedo" (1958) (unpublished)
- "Carta a un amigo" (1958) (unpublished)
- "Paraíso negro" (1958) (unpublished)
- "La navegación de Julián" (1958) (unpublished)
- "Una dama de provincias"(1958) (unpublished)
- "En la marisma" (1958) (unpublished)
- "Un empleado de banca" (1958) (unpublished)
- "El constructor de jaulas" (1958) (unpublished)
- "El viejo y Jehová" (1959) (unpublished)
- "El señor Coronel" (1959) (unpublished)

=== Novellas ===
- Retratos y Paisajes de Carmelo Vargas (1955), Revelaciones de un náufrago, Editorial Aguilar, Madrid, 1957
- La llamada (1956) (unpublished)

=== Novels ===
- Arcadia Feliz (1960), new digital edition, Editorial Torre de Viento, 2013.
- Bancarios (1961) (unfinished novel)

=== Diary ===
- Diario de viaje a las minas de Riotinto (1961) (unpublished)
