= Celestí Boada =

Celestí Boada i Salvador (1902 – 18 October 1939) was a Spanish-Catalan politician. Born in Santa Coloma de Gramenet, he was a member of the Republican Left of Catalonia and supported the Second Spanish Republic in the Spanish Civil War. Because he was a Catalan nationalist, he was executed by firing squad by the government of Francisco Franco in Campo de la Bota after the Nationalist victory.

== Bibliography ==
- Carreras García, Montserrat. La República i la Guerra Civil a Santa Coloma de Gramenet. 208 págs. Aj. de Sta. Coloma, 1986. (En catalán).
- Ruiz Santín, Fco. Javier. «El cas Celestí Boada» en Grupo de Historia José Berruezo. Una ciutat dormitori sota el franquisme: Santa Coloma de Gramenet, 1939-1975. Barcelona, Ediciones Carena, 2010 ISBN 978-84-96357-64-8, págs. 157-166. (En catalán).
