= Nicasio Álvarez de Sotomayor =

Spanish trade unionist

Nicasio Álvarez de Sotomayor (1900–1936) was a Spanish falangist politician and member of the Confederación Nacional del Trabajo (CNT). He was alcalde of the Province of Cáceres in Extremadura under the Second Spanish Republic. After the outbreak of the Spanish Civil War, he was executed by the Nationalists in the White Terror (Spain).

== Bibliography ==
- Payne, Stanley G. (1999). Fascism in Spain, 1923–1977. Madison: University of Wisconsin Press. ISBN 0-299-16560-4.
- Rodríguez Arroyo, Jesús Carlos (2010). "Nicasio Álvarez de Sotomayor Gordillo y Aguilar, "Ángel Aguilar". Del Anarcosindicalismo a Nacional-Sindicalismo" (PDF). Revista de estudios extremeños. 66 (3): 1257–1308. ISSN 0210-2854.
