= José María Díaz y Díaz Villaamil =

Spanish Galician lawyer and politician

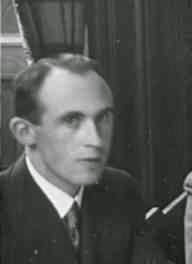
José María Díaz y Díaz Villaamil

José María Díaz y Díaz Villaamil (1898–1936) was a Spanish Galician lawyer and politician. He was a member of the Republican Left (Spain) and supporter of the Second Spanish Republic. He served as civil governor of Huesca, Malaga and Zaragoza. After the start of the Spanish Civil War, he was executed by the supporters of Francisco Franco during the White Terror (Spain).

== Bibliography ==
- Álvarez Tardío, Manuel; Villa García, Roberto (2011). Nuevos estudios sobre la Cultura Política en la II República Española 1931–1936. Madrid: Dykinson.
