= Baldomero Falcones =

Baldomero Falcones (born 1946) is a Spanish businessman. He was the chairman and CEO of Fomento de Construcciones y Contratas (FCC), a European service and construction group. FCC is included in the IBEX 35 index, which comprises the 35 most important companies on the Spanish Stock Market.

== Early life and education ==
Falcones was born 1946 in Mallorca, Spain. He earned a Superior Degree in Engineering from Universidad Politécnica de Madrid in 1970 and an MBA from IESE Business School in 1972. He continues connected with IESE as member of the Alumni Advisory Board.

== Business career ==
Falcones has been Chairman of MasterCard International (New York). He has led the merger between MasterCard and Europay and the transformation of MasterCard to become public at the NYSE in March 2006. He has been managing director of Banco Santander Central Hispano and member of the Management Executive Committee from 1987 to 2002 with different responsibilities first as head of the International Division, later as Vice Chairman and CEO of Santander Consumer Finance (former Hispamer) and finally as global COO the group.

In his extensive career, Falcones has been Chairman of Banco Urquijo Limited (UK), Hispano Americano Sociedade do Investimento (Portugal), Banco Hispano Americano Benelux, Banco Urquijo Chile, Fiat Finance S.A., Santander Seguros S.A. and CEO of Banco Hispano Industrial Investment Bank. After his banking career, he has founded with other partners Magnum Industrial Partners, the largest private equity firm in Spain and Portugal. In addition he has been member of the board of Unión Fenosa, CESCE, Generalli Spain, Seguros La Estrella, Europay International, BANIF as well as head of RWE Spain.

== Other ==
Falcones is married and has five children, Baldomero, Jaime, Sofia, Alvaro and Paloma. Currently he is Chairman of Plan Spain, a development and humanitarian organisation focusing on children’s rights. He is also member of the Economic Board of the Fundación Albeniz – Reina Sofia School of Music and former Vice Chairman of the Spanish Association Against Cancer (AECC).
