= Baldomero Sanín Cano =

Caricature of Sanín Cani

Baldomero Sanín Cano (27 June 1861 in Rionegro, Antioquia – 12 May 1957 in Bogotá) was a Colombian essayist, journalist, linguist, humanist and university professor.

He graduated as a teacher in the Normal de Rionegro, in the department of Antioquia, and became undersecretary of the Reyes administration and ambassador of Colombia in England. He was a collaborator of the Hispania magazine and an editor of the newspaper La Nación of Buenos Aires. He served as a minister in Argentina 1934. He was a member of the Academia Colombiana de la Lengua. He was also Rector of the University of El Cauca in Popayan and also collaborator of El Tiempo in Bogota.

== Works ==
- La administración Reyes 1904–1909 (1909)
- Colombia hace sesenta años (1888)
- An elementary Spanish grammar (1918)
- La civilización manual y otros ensayos (1925)
- Indagaciones e imágenes (1926)
- Manual de historia de la literatura española (1926)
- Crítica y arte (1932)
- Divagaciones filológicas y apólogos literarios (1934)
- Ensayos (1942)
- De mi vida y otras vidas (1949)
- El humanismo y el progreso del hombre (1955)
- Pesadumbre de la belleza y otros cuentos y apólogos (1957)
- Letras colombianas (1984).
