= Julián Grimau =

Spanish politician (1911–1963)

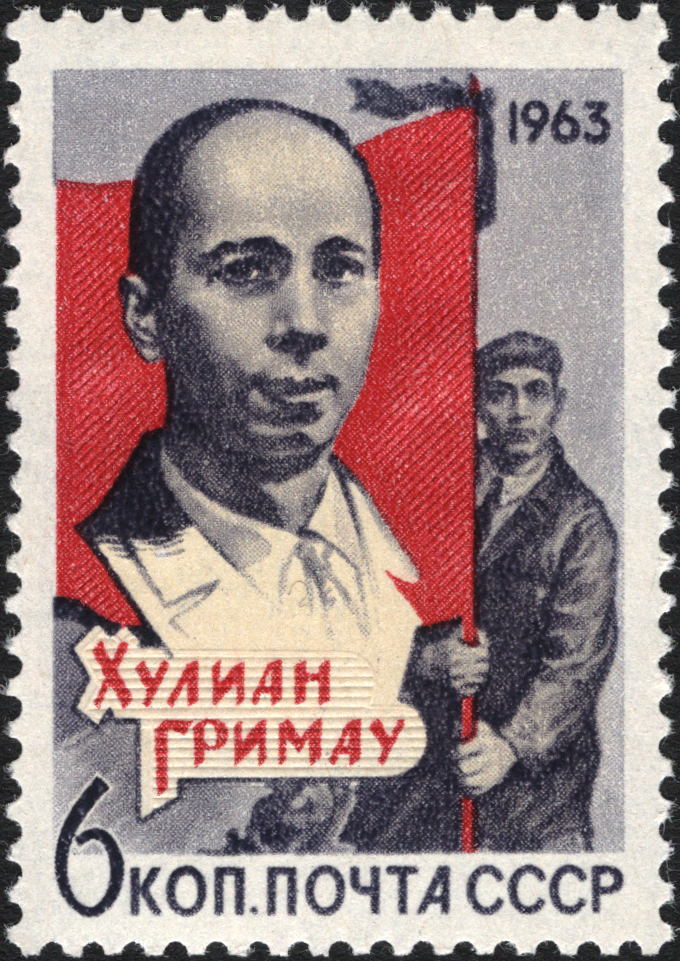
Grimau on the 1963 Soviet postage stamp

Julián Grimau García (18 February 1911 – 20 April 1963) was a Spanish politician, member of the Communist Party of Spain, executed during Francisco Franco's Francoist State.

== Political activities ==
Grimau was born in Madrid on 18 February 1911. Initially active in the Federal Republican Party and the Republican Left, he joined the Communist Party of Spain (PCE) upon the outbreak of the Spanish Civil War. Grimau spent the war years in Barcelona, where his father had been a police inspector. He was in charge of a notorious Republican prison in Barcelona from 1937 to 1938, where numerous Nationalist prisoners and anti-Stalinist communists were tortured and killed. When the Second Spanish Republic was defeated by Francisco Franco's nationales in 1939, he sought political asylum in Latin America, and later settled in France.

Grimau became one of the PCE leaders, joining the Central Committee after its Congress in Prague (1954). In 1959, he took charge of the "internal" wing of the party which operated clandestinely in Francoist Spain, living secretly in the country on various occasions.

Subsequently, Grimau became one of the Francoists most sought-after enemies, causing many historians to wonder about the reason for his ill-fated 1962 arrival in the capital. No convincing explanation has yet been identified, but former PCE leaders such as Jorge Semprún have suggested that General Secretary Santiago Carrillo wanted to have Grimau removed from party leadership and deliberately facilitated his arrest in November.

== Arrest ==
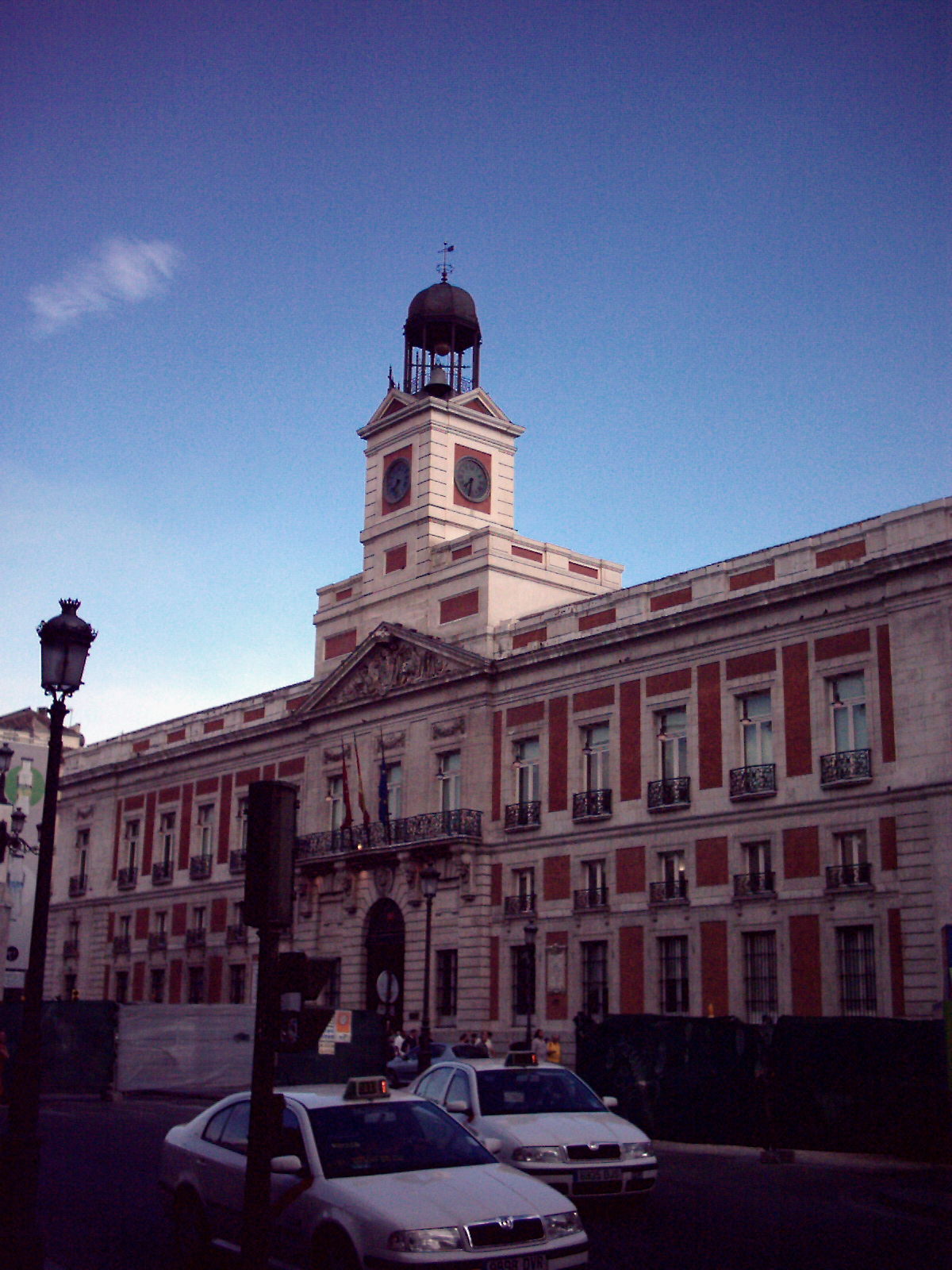
The Real Casa de Correos was the DGS central.

Julián Grimau was ambushed while traveling by bus, the only other two passengers being members of the Spanish secret police. He was taken to the Puerta del Sol headquarters of the General Security Directorate (DGS, nowadays the seat of the Comunidad de Madrid administration). Grimau fell from a second-storey window, suffering serious injuries to his skull and both of his wrists. He later claimed to his lawyers that he had been subjected to torture while in the building, and had actually been flung head first from the window by the police. Minister of the Interior Manuel Fraga Iribarne claimed that Grimau was treated properly and threw himself out the window for an "unexplainable" reason, presumably attempted suicide.

== Trial ==
Grimau was not placed under arrest for his activities in the clandestine movement (which would have been punished with imprisonment), but rather for his role in the Civil War, accusing him of the more serious crimes of torturing and killing prisoners, along with "armed rebellion." Grimau was accused by witnesses that he acted as torturer and executioner in a checa (Spanish slang for a secret leftist prison-torture centre modelled on the Soviet secret police Cheka) while in Barcelona. This charge was backed by anarchists - who accused Grimau of being a prominent member of the Republic's political police, the Servicio de Información Militar (SIM), and of having tortured and murdered anti-Stalinist soldiers in the International Brigade. The usually applied statutes had a 25-year statute of limitations, so an 1894 statute with a thirty-year statute of limitations was applied instead.

Jorge Semprún (Federico Sanchez), member of the executive committee of the PCE, wrote in his well-known Autobiografia de Federico Sanchez the following:

Following Grimau's arrest, and above all after his murder, when I took part in the preparation of the book [Julián Grimau — El hombre — El crimen — La protesta, Éditions Sociales, 1963] that the Party dedicated to Grimau's memory, I gradually learned some details of Grimau's past that I was unaware of while I shared with him our underground political work in Madrid [in 1962]. I did not know, for instance, that Julian Grimau a few weeks after the beginning of the [Spanish] Civil War [in July 1936], while he was still a member of the Federal Republican Party - he joined the Communist Party in October- became a policeman, working initially in Madrid Criminal Brigade. One day, while Fernando Claudín and I were working on the draft of the aforementioned book, he, quite disconcerted and with obvious unease and displeasure, showed me a testimony, just received from Latin America, about Grimau. There, somebody claimed with relevant details that in Barcelona Grimau fought against the fifth columnists. Furthermore, and this was what caused Claudin's unease, he fought against the POUM. I did not keep a copy of this document, and I am naturally unable to recall every point of what the Latin American witness reported. I can only swear that Grimau's involvement in the repression against the POUM was clearly established by that testimony, which was later trimmed of its most problematic aspects before being published, in a much shorter version, in the book.

Since Grimau was tried by a military tribunal, and there were few military jurists available, his prosecutor was a man of limited experience - in fact, Manuel Fernández Martín had never studied law, which he concealed by claiming (as did many other Francoist lawyers then) that he had studied during the Civil War and his diplomas burned in the bombings (which was proven false only three decades later, upon which Fernández Martín was sentenced to prison). Grimau's defender, Alejandro Rebollo Álvarez-Amandi, was the only person with legal experience in the courtroom.

The trial opened in Madrid on Thursday 18 April 1963, in a courtroom packed with journalists. Rebollo argued that the trial should be thrown out of court nullified according to the laws of the time. The charges were never backed by evidence: witnesses for the prosecution declared that they knew of his actions "by hearsay", the rumors never being confirmed. After less than five hours of trial, Grimau was sentenced to death, without deliberation.

The law applied (Ley de Responsabilidades Políticas, "Political Responsibilities Law") had been created especially for prosecuting Republic supporters (in 1938), and had not been consistently applied ever since the years immediately following the war. Moreover, the government had just approved the creation of a Public Order Tribunal (on 1 April), which was to replace the old legal institutions created during the war. Franco himself ordered for the law to be postponed until after Grimau's shooting.

== International pressure ==
Spain's claim to the outside world that the war's legacy had been left behind contrasted with the events of Grimau's trial. An international protest organized by the global Left ensued: the press campaigned in his favor, and numerous rallies took place in European and Latin American capitals. Stevedores in several ports refused to unload cargo from Spanish ships, and over 800,000 telegrams were sent to Madrid, asking for the dismissal of the kangaroo court. Nonetheless, Franco stood by his theory of "a freemason-leftist conspiracy against the political establishment". The trial coincided with the presentation of The Executioner in the Venice Film Festival, a Spanish black comedy about the death penalty.

After the court's decision, the only legal solution was the commuting of Julián Grimau's sentence into a prison term by Franco himself. Various chiefs of state appealed to the Spanish Caudillo, including Pope John XXIII and Soviet Union leader Nikita Khrushchev (a notable event in itself, since it was the first time a Soviet politician addressed the Spanish State). The pressure was echoed in Spain itself, with several personalities asking for clemency. The government met on 19 April, in a session that lasted ten hours: although Fernando María Castiella, the minister of foreign affairs, declared himself in favor of the pardon (bearing in mind the consequences on Spain's image), his opposition was timid. Franco imposed voting on the matter, and the final verdict was unanimity for Grimau's execution.

== Death ==
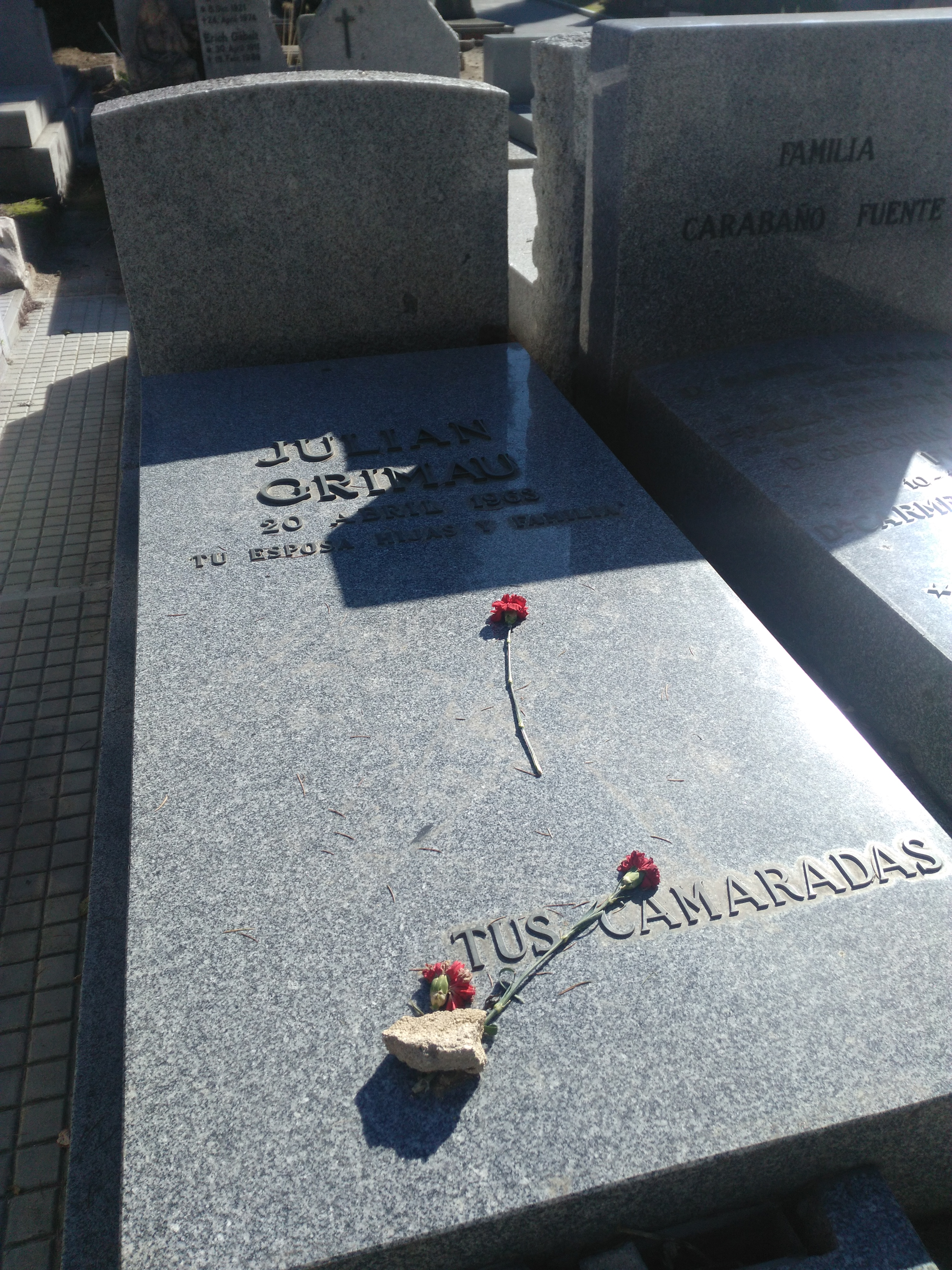
Grave of Julián Grimau in Madrid

The firing squad he faced was to be composed of Guardia Civil members, but they refused to carry out the order, saying they did not bear responsibility for such things. The Madrid captain-general (apparently on direct orders from Franco) resorted to a second option, and called on volunteer enlisted soldiers, who carried out the execution. Julián Grimau was buried in Madrid's civil cemetery.

== Legacy and exoneration dispute ==
With Spain's transition to democracy (from 1975), it became possible to look into the treatment given to Grimau and other political prisoners. Nevertheless, agreements such as those concluded in the Palacio de la Moncloa effectively imposed a moratorium - of which, paradoxically, one was favored by the PCE. There was at the time a general consensus to forget the crimes of Francoist Spain and bury the legacies of the Republic and the Civil War. In the 1980s, according to PCE members and people close to Grimau, the Madrid City Council, during a session led by Socialist Enrique Tierno Galván, discussed renaming the Avenida del Mediterráneo Julián Grimau, only for the proposition to be rejected by the Communists. Several avenues and public buildings in Spain are named after Grimau nowadays.

The new climate of the 1990s brought forward public debate about the fate of Franco's adversaries. Numerous attempts originated with the Izquierda Unida, a coalition joined by PCE after it ousted Carrillo. However, these attempts only took place after the center-left Spanish Socialist Workers' Party, somewhat closer in the ideological spectrum to Izquierda Unida, had lost the general elections against the PP, both in 1996 and 2000. On 15 April 2002, Izquierda Unida presented a proposal to the Cortes Generales for Grimau's "public and democratic exoneration", which was backed by all parties represented, with the exception of the conservative People's Party (PP); since the latter had absolute majority, the proposal was not made effective. The PP opposed exoneration on the grounds that it went against the moratorium. It also resented the shadow the proposal cast over the figure of Manuel Fraga, who had in the meanwhile become a founding member of the PP.

In May 2005, Izquierda Unida launched a similar process within the Community of Madrid Assembly, which was approved with support from the PP (majority party in the Community).

Grimau's death is the subject of a song by Violeta Parra (Qué Dirá El Santo Padre) as well as of one by Thanos Mikroutsikos (lyrics by Wolf Biermann), the French singer Léo Ferré (song Franco la muerte) and the Esperanto singer Gianfranco Molle (song Kamarado Ĵuljan' Grimaŭ).

Grimau's daughter Dolores married the writer and professor Gonzalo Santonja, a former communist who was later named in the Junta of Castile and León by Vox.

== See also ==
- List of people executed by Francoist Spain
- Tribunal de Orden Público
- Paul del Rio

== Bibliography ==
- Payne, Stanley G. (2014). Franco: A Personal and Political Biography. University of Wisconsin Press. ISBN 978-029-93021-0-8.
