= Juan Peset =

Spanish physician (1886–1941)

Juan Bautista Peset Aleixandre
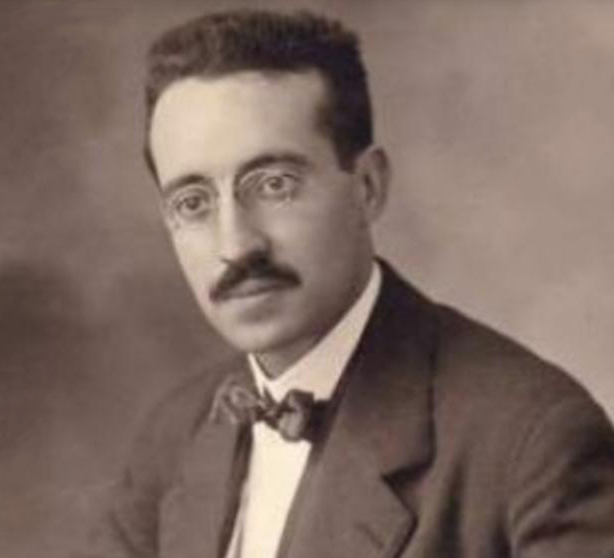
- Portrait of Juan Bautista Peset Aleixandre (1920)
- Born: 1886; Godella, Spain
- Died: 24 May 1941 (aged 54–55); Paterna, Spain
- Education: University of Valencia
- Known for: Forensic medicine
- Scientific career
- Fields: Medicine
- Workplaces: University of Valencia

Juan Bautista Peset Aleixandre, also known as Joan Baptista Peset i Aleixandre (2 July 1886 – 24 May 1941) was a Spanish doctor, university professor and chancellor, and politician. He was executed by Franco’s regime after the end of the Spanish Civil War.

== Biography ==
Juan Peset was born in 1886 in Godella. His father, Vicente Peset Cervera, was an eminent doctor, the most important representative of the silver age of medicine in Valencia. At the age of 22, Juan Peset held three doctoral degrees (Medicine, Sciences and Law). Following in the footsteps of his family, he pursued a career as a doctor and became one of the most important figures in Spanish experimental medicine. He led a group of scientists at the University of Valencia, and became the director of the medical journal La Crónica Médica. Between 1910 and 1916, he practiced medicine in Sevilla, and returned to the University of Valencia where he held a chair in the department of Toxicology and Forensic Medicine. In 1931, he was elected as a dean of the Faculty of Medicine, and continued to become the chancellor of the University of Valencia between 1932 and 1934. During this time, he was taking steps to democratize the university (e.g. by introducing representatives of students and assistants in the running of the university), and he initiated vaccination campaigns to eradicate epidemics that were devastating Valencia.

Juan Peset was also an active member of a left-wing republican political party called Izquierda Republicana (Republican Left) and later became its president in Valencia. He was leading the candidate list for the 1936 elections, and was elected as a member of parliament for Frente Popular (Popular Front), being the most voted politician in the province. During the Spanish Civil War, he was pursuing his humanitarian work, helping the prosecuted in Valencia, and he was in charge of several hospitals. He was present at the last meeting of the Cortes Generales, and fled to France with thousands of fellow republicans shortly after. However, he returned to Spain to negotiate with Segismundo Casado and Julián Besteiro and talked them out of their planned overthrow of the prime minister Juan Negrín. At the end of the war, he tried to flee into exile through Alicante, where he was caught by Franco's nationalists. He spent the following two years in a concentration camp and a prison, until his execution in the Fosses de Paterna on 24 May 1941.

== See also ==
- Final offensive of the Spanish Civil War
