= Neus Bouza Gil =

Catalan anarchist

- Born: 1916; Barcelona, Catalonia, Spain
- Died: 26 May 1939 (aged 22–23); Barcelona, Catalonia, Spain
- Cause of death: Execution by firing squad

Neus Bouza Gil (1916–1939) was a Catalan anarchist militiawoman, executed at the age of 22. She was one of the twelve women in the Les Corts prison who were shot in the Camp de la Bota by Franco's regime.

== Biography ==
Born in Barcelona in 1916, she lived in the neighbourhood of El Poblenou. In 1936, at the beginning of the Spanish Civil War, she joined the confederal militias in the rearguard and was assigned to the old artillery school, established in the Castle of the Four Towers in Camp de la Bota, where she was in charge of the laundry and kitchen. Shortly afterwards, Francisco Largo Caballero's government ordered an end to the militiawomen and demobilised the women at the front. Bouza Gil went back to work in the canvas factory in Ali-Bey Street. On 10 October 1936, she joined the Confederación Nacional del Trabajo (CNT). The defeat of the Republican side gave way to Francoist dictatorship and a harsh repression of the defeated began. On 23 February 1939, a neighbour denounced Bouza and she was arrested by a platoon of Falangists. She was handed over to the police and imprisoned on 8 March. On 26 April she was subjected to a drumhead court-martial, accused of having participated in or witnessed the execution of right-wingers, which she denied. Sentenced to death, she was shot in the Camp de la Bota on 26 May 1939, along with 22 men.

== Recognition ==
During the events of the 2013 Festa Major, the town council of Sant Adrià de Besòs inaugurated the Nues Bouza assembly hall in the Municipal Library, following a proposal by the Municipal Women's Council. It was part of the Streets with a Woman's Name project, the aim of which was to give visibility to the role of women in all areas of civic life and to pay tribute to the memory of all those who were shot in the Camp de la Bota.

== See also ==
- Anarchism in Spain
