= Bernabé Argüelles de Paz =

Asturian anarchist (1912–1943)

- Born: 1912; Lena, Asturias, Spain
- Died: 24 March 1943 (aged 30–31); Barcelona, Catalonia, Spain
- Military career
- Allegiance: CNT
- Service: Confederal militias (1936–1937); Spanish Republican Army (1937–1939)
- Service years: 1936–1939
- Unit: 133rd Mixed Brigade
- Conflicts: Spanish Civil War

Bernabé Argüelles de Paz (1912–1943) was an Asturian anarchist.

== Biography ==
Born in the Asturian town of Pola de Lena in 1912, he was a member of the National Confederation of Labor (CNT). After the outbreak of the Spanish Civil War he joined the anarcho-syndicalist militias. (Note: Some sources incorrectly place him as commander of the 127th Mixed Brigade.) Later he became part of the political commissariat of the Spanish Republican Army, serving as commissar of the 133rd Mixed Brigade. At the end of the war he was detained by the nationalists, being imprisoned in the provincial prison of Huesca.

Thanks to the intervention of the Ponzán group, in mid-1940 he was able to escape from prison together with other imprisoned anarchists. He managed to reach Catalonia, where he developed an intense activity underground. Argüelles was part of the Aragón-Cataluña interregional committee of the CNT. On 8 March 1943 he was arrested by Francoist security forces. Tried by a court-martial, he was sentenced to death and executed by garrote on 24 March 1943 in Barcelona.

== Bibliography ==
- Corbalán Gil, Joan (2008). Justícia, no venjança: els executats pel franquisme a Barcelona (1939-1952) (in Spanish). Cossetània Edicions.
- Engel, Carlos (1999). Historia de las Brigadas Mixtas del Ejército Popular de la República (in Spanish). Madrid, Almena. 84-922644-7-0.
- Paz, Abel (2001). CNT 1939-1951. El Anarquismo contra el Estado franquista (in Spanish). Fundación de Estudios Libertarios «Anselmo Lorenzo».
- Téllez, Antonio (1992). Sabaté. Guerrilla urbana en España (1945-1960) (in Spanish). Barcelona: Editorial Virus.
