= María Lozano Hernández =

Spanish anarchist

- Born: 11 October 1909; Valladolid, Spain
- Died: 19 January 1940 (aged 30); Madrid, Spain
- Cause of death: Execution by firing squad
- Resting place: Cementerio de la Almudena
- Organization: Solidaridad Internacional Antifascista (SIA)
- Children: Florentino

María Lozano Hernández, also known as La Gitana, (11 October 1909 – 19 January 1940) was a Spanish libertarian activist of Calé ethnicity. She was one of the first women to be executed by the dictatorship of Francisco Franco.

== Biography ==
Born in Valladolid, Spain, a town with a large Calé population, Lozano was the daughter of Encarnación Hernández and Ramón Lozano. She was active in the humanitarian organisation Solidaridad Internacional Antifascista (SIA), created by the anarchosyndicalist Confederación Nacional del Trabajo (CNT) in Valencia in April 1937.

The details of her move from Valladolid to Madrid are not known. However, Dr Rafael Buhigas Jiménez, specialist in Romani Studies, theorised that the immediate occupation of Valladolid by Franco’s forces following the military uprising of 18 July 1936 led Lozano and others opposed to the coup to flee to the capital.

It is known that at the start of the conflict she was living with her son and partner in the building known as ‘el faro’ (‘the lighthouse’), near the checkpoint of the CNT Defence Committee in Vallecas, at kilometre 6 of the Valencia road.

Lozano was arrested in the Madrid neighbourhood of Carabanchel nine months after the Spanish Civil War ended and encarcerated in the Ventas women's prison on 1 December 1939 with her five-month-old son Florentino whose father was imprisoned on the same day in the Santa Rita reformatory, which had then been converted into a prison for Republican prisoners. The baby died of bronchopneumonia six weeks after being imprisoned, on 16 January 1940. Lozano was allowed watch over her dead son before being executed by firing squad on 19 January, two days after Florentino Salcedo Abascal, the father of her son, was executed on the wall of the East Madrid Cemetery.

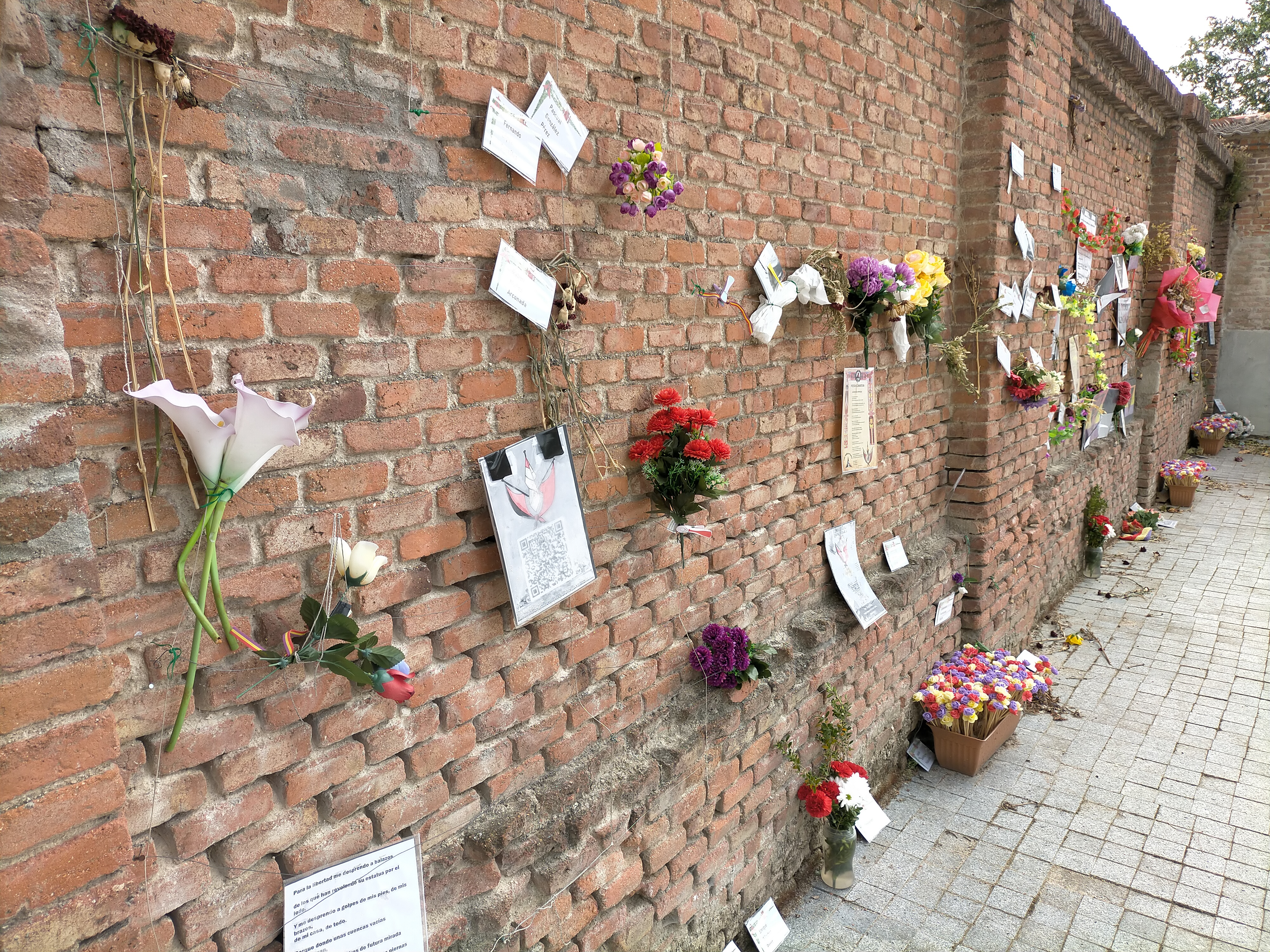
Execution wall of the Almudena cemetery.

She was one of the three thousand people executed and buried in the eastern necropolis of La Almudena cemetery in the first five years of repression after the Spanish Civil War.

Those who had been shot, including Lozano, were placed in coffins in groups of fifteen and buried in mass graves. A decade later, the bodies were exhumed and placed in a collective ossuary now lying beneath the buildings subsequently erected on that site.

== See also ==
- María Pérez Lacruz
