= Maria Garcia Sanchis =

Valencian weaver and militiawoman

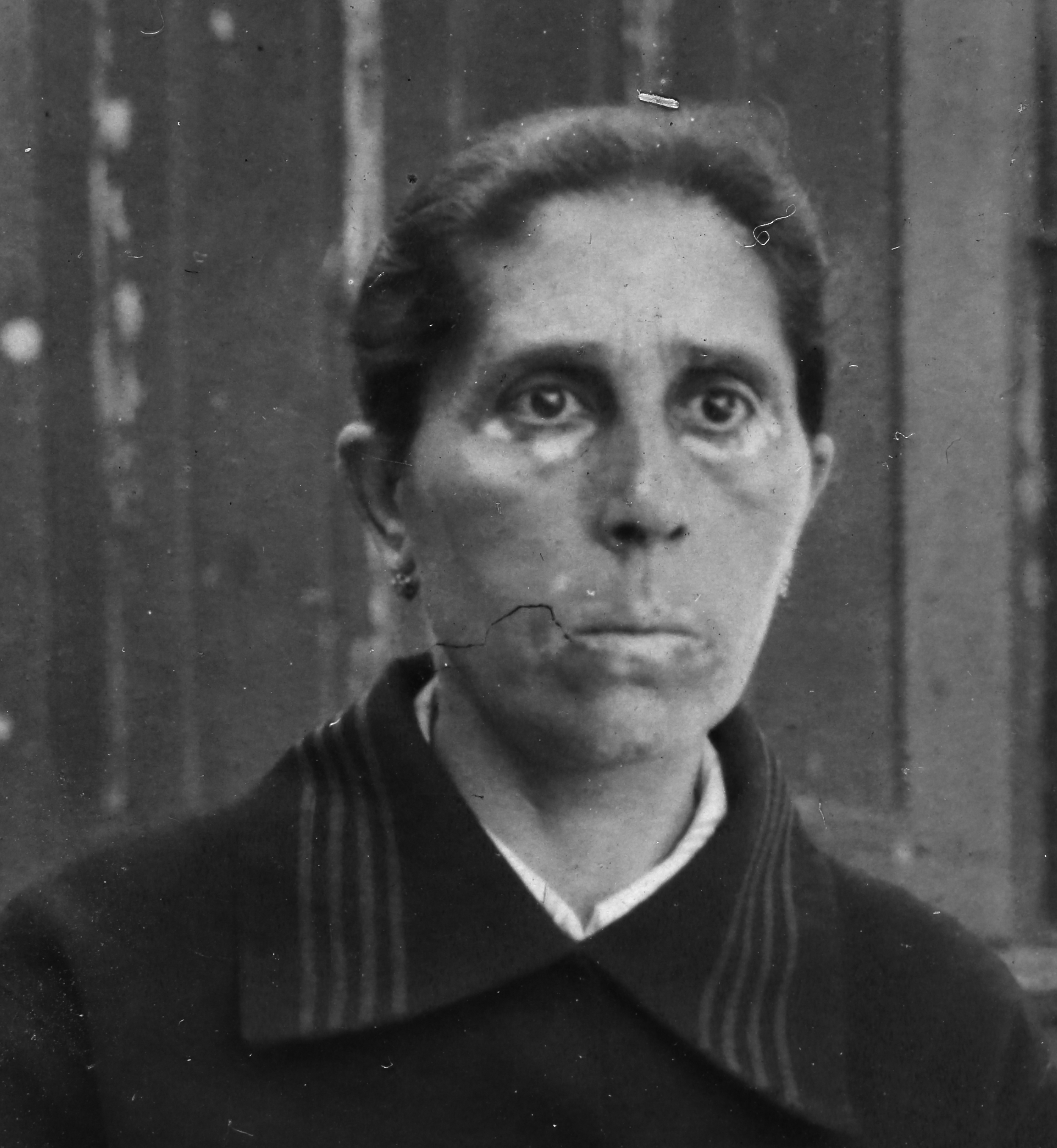
- Maria Garcia Sanchis (1920s)
- Born: 1881; L'Olleria, Valencia, Spain
- Died: 5 September 1936 (aged 54–55); Manacor, Mallorca, Spain
- Military career
- Allegiance: Spanish Republic
- Service years: 1936
- Unit: Anti-Fascist Women's Militia
- Conflicts: Spanish Civil War: Battle of Barcelona; Battle of Mallorca

Maria Garcia Sanchis (1881–1936) was a Valencian weaver and militiawoman who was one of Las Cinco de Mallorca. She was also a spiritist and anarchist.

== Biography ==
A weaver by trade, Garcia Sanchis was self-taught and an avid reader, with firm spiritual convictions. She was committed to anarchism and a great orator. Garcia Sanchis took part in the 1934 Catalan local elections, in a women's rally held at the Teatro Principal in Sabadell. She enlisted in the Anti-Fascist Women's Militia led by her fellow member of the Unified Socialist Party of Catalonia (PSUC), Gavina Viana, in the early days of the Spanish Civil War. Garcia Sanchis was photographed by Robert Capa and Gerda Taro at Camp de la Bota, where the militia women were training, and also appeared in Life magazine.

On 16 August 1936, María and her fellow militia members of the women's battalion embarked for Mallorca from the port of Barcelona in the Republican army expedition commanded by Captain Alberto Bayo. After twenty days of fighting, she and four of her companions were captured, tortured and executed in Manacor on 5 September 1936. The Nationalist troops were led by the Italian fascist Arconovaldo Bonaccorsi. They have gone down in history under the name of Las Cinco de Mallorca (The Mallorca Five). Mallorca was one of the first places where the anti-fascist women fighters went into combat in the Civil War.

== Recognition ==
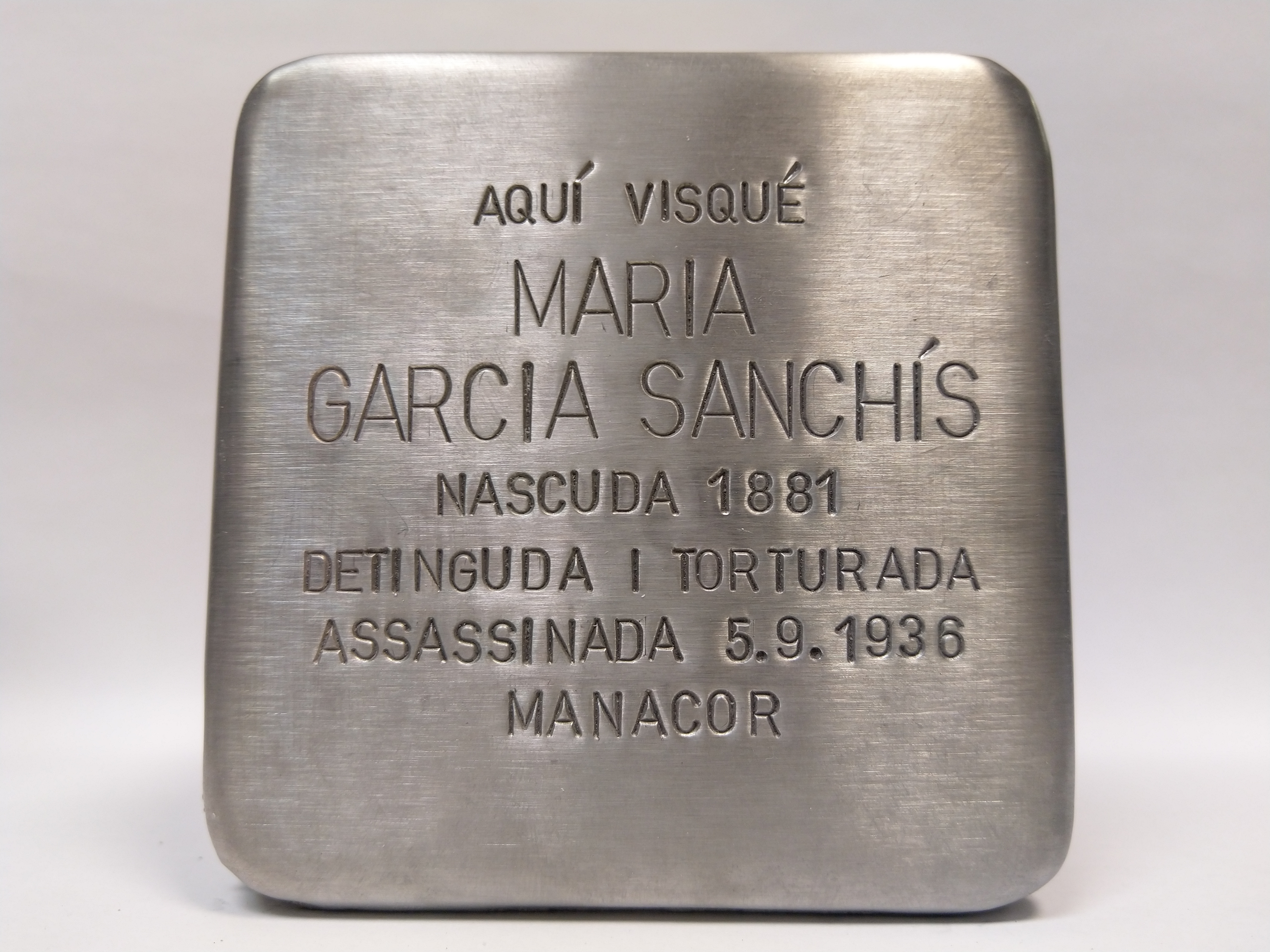
Monument to Maria Garcia Sanchis

The documentary Milicianes by Tania Balló, Jaume Miró and Gonzalo Berger, recovered her name and those of the other combatants, Teresa Bellera, Daría and Mercedes Buxadé, although the name of the fifth, who kept a diary, is unknown. They appear in a photograph taken a few hours before they were shot.

On 27 March 2022, in Sabadell, a steel stolperstein bearing her name was placed in the Can Rull neighbourhood, in the Carrer de Gustavo Adolfo Bécquer. The memorial was laid at the gates of what was Maria's family residence from 1935 onwards, where she had a handloom and a winding machine in the courtyard. She thus became the first woman with one of these stones in Sabadell.weaver and militiawoman who was one of Las Cinco de Mallorca. The cobblestone was exhibited a few days earlier at the Sabadell History Museum, together with the exhibition on the teacher Joaquima Torres i Oriol.
