= Emilio Leciguyena =

Emilio Leciguyena (19 August 1903 – 6 September 1936) was a Spanish alcalde and supporter of the Second Spanish Republic during the Spanish Civil War. He was executed by the Nationalist supporters of Francisco Franco during the White Terror (Spain).
