= Enforced disappearances in Francoist Spain =

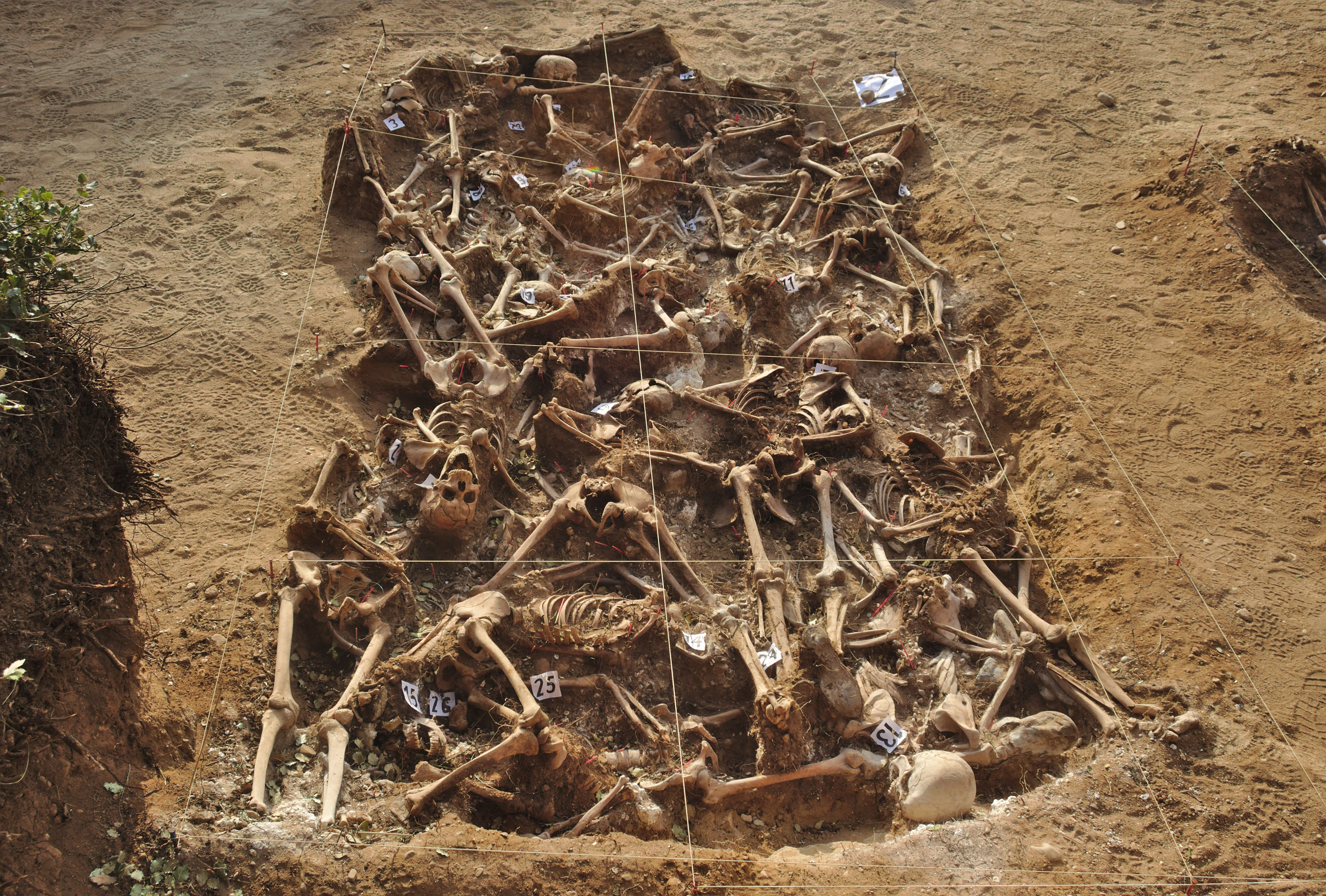
- Mass grave in Estépar, Burgos province, containing 26 Republican victims. Excavation took place in July and August 2014.
- Location: Francoist Spain
- Date: 1936—1976
- Victims: At least 140,000

According to the Platform of Victims of Forced Disappearances under Franco, more than 140,000 people disappeared during the Franco regime, including victims of the Spanish Civil War and the subsequent Franco dictatorship. The most recent academic studies estimated the number of victims of Francoist repression during the war at 130,199 and the number of victims of Republican repression at 49,272.

According to Miguel Ángel Rodríguez Arias, a researcher in criminal law at the University of Castilla-La Mancha, Spain is the only democracy that has not conducted any investigation into state terrorism after the end of the dictatorship.

The UN has repeatedly called on Spain to investigate both the crimes of Franco's regime and the disappeared during the dictatorship. The Permanent Commission of the Parliamentary Assembly of the Council of Europe unanimously approved a condemnation of the Franco regime in which it urged the Spanish government, among other tasks, to create a commission of inquiry into the crimes of the dictatorship.

== Introduction ==
Several decades have passed since the Kingdom of Spain ratified the European Convention on Human Rights in 1979, and the whereabouts of tens of thousands of victims of the Spanish Civil War and the subsequent Franco dictatorship remain unknown.

Articles 2 and 13 of this Convention establish the obligation to undertake an "effective and independent official investigation" into all reported cases of disappearance. At least 143,353 people have disappeared, not including missing children or those missing in action. In Andalusia alone, with 54,000 missing people in mass graves, there are more missing people than adding together the crimes of forced disappearance of people committed in Chile, Argentina, Peru and Guatemala. Before the judicial investigation undertaken by Baltasar Garzón from the National Court, and in the absence of prior investigation by the State, it was erroneously estimated that the number of missing people during the Franco regime did not exceed 30,000 victims, figures that, from revisionist and denialist theses, were trying to diminish or even deny.

== Historical context ==
The military rebellion carried out from July 17 to 18, 1936, against the government of the Second Republic, began what became known as the Spanish Civil War, which officially ended on April 1, 1939. During this civil war, and the subsequent dictatorship established by its victors, Franco and his generals carried out a systematic persecution of the defenders of the Spanish Republic. This included, among other forms of repression that could be classified as crimes against humanity, various forms of disappearance of persons.

After the restoration of democracy in Spain and the reinstatement of the monarchy in its parliamentary form, the majority of those disappeared during the dictatorship continue to be so.

== Figures of missing persons during the regime ==
According to the newspaper La Nueva España, the data provided in the order of the Audiencia Nacional of October 16, 2008, referring to missing persons in mass graves are the following:

Autonomous community	Total missing	Province	Missing
Andalucía	32,289	Almería	373
Andalucía	32,289	Cádiz	1,665
Andalucía	32,289	Córdoba	7,091
Andalucía	32,289	Granada	5,048
Andalucía	32,289	Huelva	3,805
Andalucía	32,289	Jaén	3,253
Andalucía	32,289	Málaga	7,797
Andalucía	32,289	Sevilla	3,257
Aragón	10,178	Huesca	2,061
Aragón	10,178	Teruel	1,338
Aragón	10,178	Zaragoza	6,779
Asturias	1,246	Gijón	1,246
Islas Baleares	1,777	Mallorca	1,486
Islas Baleares	1,777	Menorca	106
Islas Baleares	1,777	Ibiza y Formentera	185
Canarias	262	Gran Canaria	200
Canarias	262	Tenerife	62
Cantabria	850	N/A	N/A
Castilla-La Mancha	7,067	Albacete	1,026
Castilla-La Mancha	7,067	Ciudad Real	1,694
Castilla-La Mancha	7,067	Cuenca	377
Castilla-La Mancha	7,067	Toledo	3,970
Castilla y León	12,979	Ávila	650
Castilla y León	12,979	Burgos	4,800
Castilla y León	12,979	León	1,250
Castilla y León	12,979	Palencia	1,180
Castilla y León	12,979	Salamanca	650
Castilla y León	12,979	Segovia	370
Castilla y León	12,979	Soria	287
Castilla y León	12,979	Valladolid	2,555
Castilla y León	12,979	Zamora	1,237
Cataluña	2,400	N/A	N/A
C. Valenciana	4,345	Alicante	742
C. Valenciana	4,345	Castellón	1,303
C. Valenciana	4,345	Valencia	2,300
Extremadura	10,266	N/A	N/A
Galicia	4,396	N/A	N/A
La Rioja	2,007	N/A	N/A
Madrid	2,995	N/A	N/A
Murcia	855	N/A	N/A
Navarra	3,431	N/A	N/A
País Vasco	9,459	Álava	100
País Vasco	9,459	Guipúzcoa	340
País Vasco	9,459	Vizcaya	369
País Vasco	9,459	Datos del Gobierno Vasco	8,650
Ceuta, Melilla y Norte de África	464	N/A	N/A
Otros territorios	7,000	N/A	N/A

Total: 114,266. These figures that would be increased to 143,353 during the course of the proceedings.
