= Tomás López da Torre =

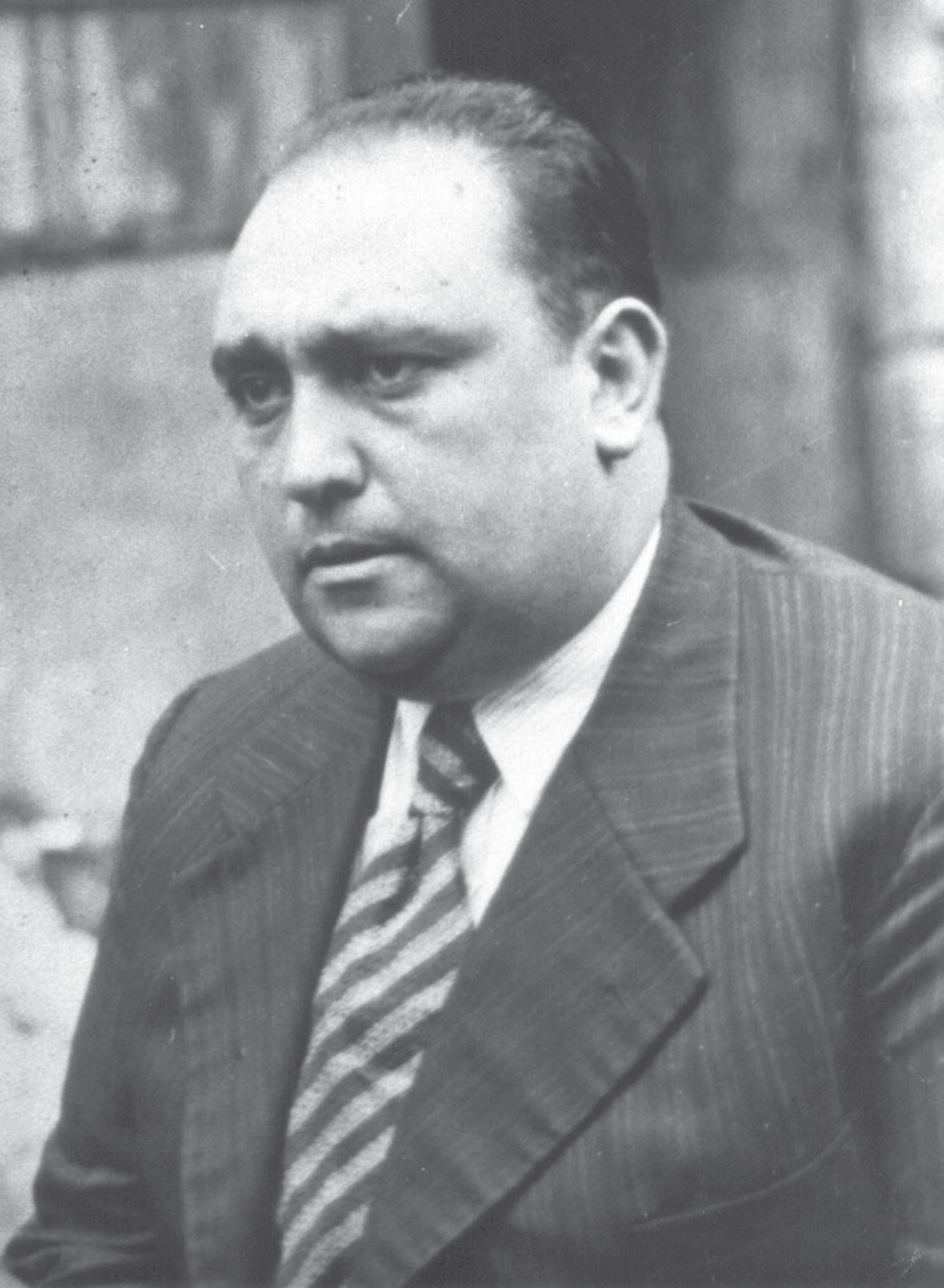
Tomás López da Torre

Tomás López da Torre (1900 – October 1, 1936) was a Spanish lawyer, alcalde and supporter of the Second Spanish Republic during the Spanish Civil War. He was born in Betanzos. He was executed by the Nationalists of Francisco Franco during the White Terror (Spain).
