= José María León Jiménez =

Spanish politician

José María León Jiménez (17 April 1893 – 2 August 1936) was a Spanish Socialist Workers' Party politician and supporter of the Second Spanish Republic during the Spanish Civil War. He was executed by the Nationalists of Francisco Franco during the White Terror.
