= Otilio Alba Polo =

Spanish Catalan politician

Otilio Alba Polo (1915 – 18 March 1941) was a Spanish Catalan politician. He was born in Barcelona. He supported the Second Spanish Republic during the Spanish Civil War. After the victory of the Nationalists, he was executed by the government of Francisco Franco.
