= Baldomero Fernández Ladreda =

Spanish politician

Baldomero Fernández Ladreda (18 July 1906 – 15 November 1947) was a Communist Party of Spain politician. He fought in the Spanish Civil War on the side of the Second Spanish Republic. He was executed by garrote vil by the government of Francisco Franco.
