= List of U.S. states and territories by educational attainment =

This list of U.S. states and territories by educational attainment covers the 50 U.S. states, the District of Columbia, and the territory of Puerto Rico and their populations' educational attainment for all people of at least 25 years of age. The four other inhabited U.S. territories (American Samoa, Guam, the Northern Mariana Islands, and the U.S. Virgin Islands) are listed separately.

The data source for the main list is the U.S. Census Bureau's American Community Survey in 2021. The data source for the territories table is from 2010 U.S. Census Bureau data, because those territories are excluded from the American Community Survey. The American Community Survey is a large demographic survey collected throughout the year using mailed questionnaires, telephone interviews, and visits from Census Bureau field representatives to about 3.5 million household addresses annually, regardless of their legal immigration status. The survey does not measure graduation rates from different educational institutions, but instead, it measures the percentage of adult residents with a high school diploma.

Overall, 90.3% of Americans over the age of 25 had graduated from high school in 2021, with the highest level found in the state of Massachusetts at 96.1% and the lowest in the state of California at 84.4%. In Puerto Rico, the proportion was even lower, though, at 79.6%.

34.9% of Americans over the age of 25 had educational attainment of having a bachelor's degree or higher in 2019. The state with the highest percentage of people having a bachelor's degree or higher educational attainment was Massachusetts at 50.6%, and the lowest was West Virginia at 24.1%. The District of Columbia had a percentage significantly higher than that of any U.S. state at 63.0%.

Advanced Degrees, such as Master's Degrees and Doctorates were held by 16.7% of Americans at least 25 years old in 2019. Advanced Degrees were most common in Massachusetts, with 26.3% of Massachusetts residents holding an advanced degree of any type since 2019 (it is regarded as the best state for Higher Education), and they were least common in Mississippi, with 9.3% of Mississippi residents holding an advanced degree. The District of Columbia had a percentage of 37.8%, higher than that of any state, while in the Commonwealth of Puerto Rico, 7.9% of Americans had an advanced degree, a proportion lower than any state in the U.S.

As of the 2010 census, four U.S. territories (American Samoa, Guam, the Northern Mariana Islands, and the U.S. Virgin Islands) had educational attainment numbers below every U.S. state (and the District of Columbia). In the U.S. Virgin Islands, 68.9% had attained a high school degree or higher; in American Samoa, 9.9% had attained a bachelor's degree or higher.

== List ==
In the list below, one can find the population in each state and territory of the U.S. who has attained a specific education level (out of people 25 years or over), and the percentage of the population who has attained that education level. The list is initially sorted in Alphabetical order but one can click the table headers to sort by any column.

State or Territory	Population over the age of 25	With a High School Diploma or higher		With a Bachelor's Degree or higher		With an Advanced Degree	
State or Territory	Population over the age of 25	Population	Pct	Population	Pct	Population	Pct
Alabama	3,451,208	3,034,741	87.93%	946,766	27.43%	374,490	10.85%
Alaska	485,779	453,289	93.31%	159,290	32.79%	57,868	11.91%
Arizona	4,980,297	4,430,934	88.97%	1,615,081	32.43%	629,408	12.64%
Arkansas	2,037,763	1,806,873	88.67%	515,034	25.27%	190,897	9.37%
California	26,909,869	22,724,990	84.45%	9,737,817	36.19%	3,779,787	14.05%
Colorado	4,044,182	3,738,208	92.43%	1,796,240	44.42%	688,931	17.04%
Connecticut	2,534,376	2,309,185	91.11%	1,067,671	42.13%	479,981	18.94%
Delaware	711,104	649,638	91.36%	253,292	35.62%	106,997	15.05%
District of Columbia	478,774	444,233	92.79%	301,852	63.05%	181,081	37.82%
Florida	15,762,122	14,153,579	89.79%	5,226,846	33.16%	1,978,625	12.55%
Georgia	7,234,271	6,436,394	88.97%	2,505,076	34.63%	991,062	13.70%
Hawaii	1,021,687	949,476	92.93%	360,681	35.30%	133,832	13.10%
Idaho	1,257,566	1,147,653	91.26%	386,264	30.72%	132,502	10.54%
Illinois	8,730,697	7,872,693	90.17%	3,242,579	37.14%	1,310,297	15.01%
Indiana	4,559,631	4,132,897	90.64%	1,316,787	28.88%	473,718	10.39%
Iowa	2,137,261	1,994,595	93.32%	652,742	30.54%	210,864	9.87%
Kansas	1,942,133	1,784,711	91.89%	687,452	35.40%	259,988	13.39%
Kentucky	3,077,867	2,708,147	87.99%	830,414	26.98%	341,868	11.11%
Louisiana	3,117,186	2,701,889	86.68%	824,369	26.45%	300,894	9.65%
Maine	1,015,078	959,533	94.53%	365,305	35.99%	140,318	13.82%
Maryland	4,273,260	3,892,442	91.09%	1,818,202	48.55%	861,669	24.16%
Massachusetts	4,934,755	4,495,563	96.10%	2,300,423	50.62%	1,049,675	28.27%
Michigan	6,971,895	6,411,597	91.96%	2,208,170	31.67%	870,008	12.48%
Minnesota	3,898,742	3,669,895	94.13%	1,516,426	38.90%	522,543	13.40%
Mississippi	1,968,167	1,702,178	86.49%	487,663	24.78%	184,007	9.35%
Missouri	4,226,634	3,871,249	91.59%	1,340,643	31.72%	517,428	12.24%
Montana	766,758	723,450	94.35%	266,820	34.80%	95,443	12.45%
Nebraska	1,292,536	1,191,221	92.16%	445,261	34.45%	158,751	12.28%
Nevada	2,192,826	1,911,173	87.16%	604,626	27.57%	211,418	9.64%
New Hampshire	1,008,318	952,238	94.44%	405,815	40.98%	158,459	15.72%
New Jersey	6,474,427	5,890,494	90.98%	2,790,646	43.10%	1,126,293	17.40%
New Mexico	1,450,549	1,268,955	87.48%	435,930	30.05%	204,185	14.08%
New York	13,987,094	12,313,514	88.03%	5,583,687	40.90%	2,477,848	17.72%
North Carolina	7,245,632	6,499,145	89.70%	2,529,657	34.91%	955,976	13.19%
North Dakota	506,739	474,432	93.62%	160,847	31.74%	47,533	9.38%
Ohio	8,117,973	7,447,659	91.74%	2,493,910	30.72%	957,286	11.79%
Oklahoma	2,639,889	2,341,875	88.71%	737,183	27.92%	254,015	9.62%
Oregon	3,030,635	2,784,373	91.87%	1,101,061	36.33%	420,755	13.88%
Pennsylvania	9,161,945	8,418,661	91.89%	3,164,985	34.54%	1,277,263	13.94%
Puerto Rico	2,401,409	1,912,629	79.65%	683,894	28.48%	190,538	7.93%
Rhode Island	773,464	689,448	89.14%	282,326	36.50%	120,732	15.61%
South Carolina	3,598,398	3,224,401	89.61%	1,134,636	31.53%	429,896	11.95%
South Dakota	590,377	549,364	93.05%	186,946	31.67%	59,688	10.11%
Tennessee	4,814,533	4,320,485	89.74%	1,467,481	30.48%	543,077	11.28%
Texas	19,224,688	16,415,784	85.39%	6,366,437	33.12%	2,288,616	11.90%
Utah	2,010,727	1,873,479	93.17%	740,097	36.81%	255,215	12.69%
Vermont	462,705	437,478	94.55%	205,621	44.44%	85,248	18.42%
Virginia	5,942,672	5,430,700	91.38%	2,484,460	41.81%	1,089,585	18.33%
Washington	5,401,149	4,987,844	92.35%	2,104,662	40.97%	817,197	15.13%
West Virginia	1,265,439	1,123,971	88.82%	305,188	24.12%	125,812	9.94%
Wisconsin	4,076,339	3,804,265	93.33%	1,326,478	32.54%	450,011	11.04%
Wyoming	395,348	369,992	93.59%	115,618	29.24%	42,363	10.72%
United States	230,594,873	205,833,612	90.3%	80,587,357	34.9%	31,611,941	16.7%

== U.S. territories ==
Below is a table of the educational attainment of four U.S. territories (American Samoa, Guam, the Northern Mariana Islands, and the U.S. Virgin Islands. The data in the table below is from the 2010 census because these territories are not included in the American Community Survey. Puerto Rico is not included in this table because Puerto Rico is included in the American Community Survey (with the name "Puerto Rico Community Survey") — Puerto Rico is included in the table above.

The data below is for people 25 years and older.

Territory	% High school graduate or higher (2010 census)	% Bachelor's degree or higher (2010 census)	% Advanced degree (2010 census)	Total population (2010 census)	Population with high school degree or higher (2010 census)	Population with bachelor's degree or higher (2010 census)	Population with advanced degree (2010 census)
American Samoa	82.1%	9.9%	3.5%	25,907	21,265	4,940	906
Guam	79.4%	20.4%	5.2%	89,253	70,905	18,179	4,666
Northern Mariana Islands	82.4%	20.2%	3.7%	32,602	26,865	6,585	1,202
U.S. Virgin Islands	68.9%	19.2%	7.4%	70,813	48,791	5,450	5,229

== Maps ==
Proportion of Americans with a high school diploma or higher in each U.S. state, the District of Columbia, and Puerto Rico.

Proportion of Americans with a bachelor's degree or higher in each U.S. state, the District of Columbia, and Puerto Rico.

Proportion of Americans with an advanced degree (e.g. Master's, Doctorate) in each U.S. state, the District of Columbia, and Puerto Rico.

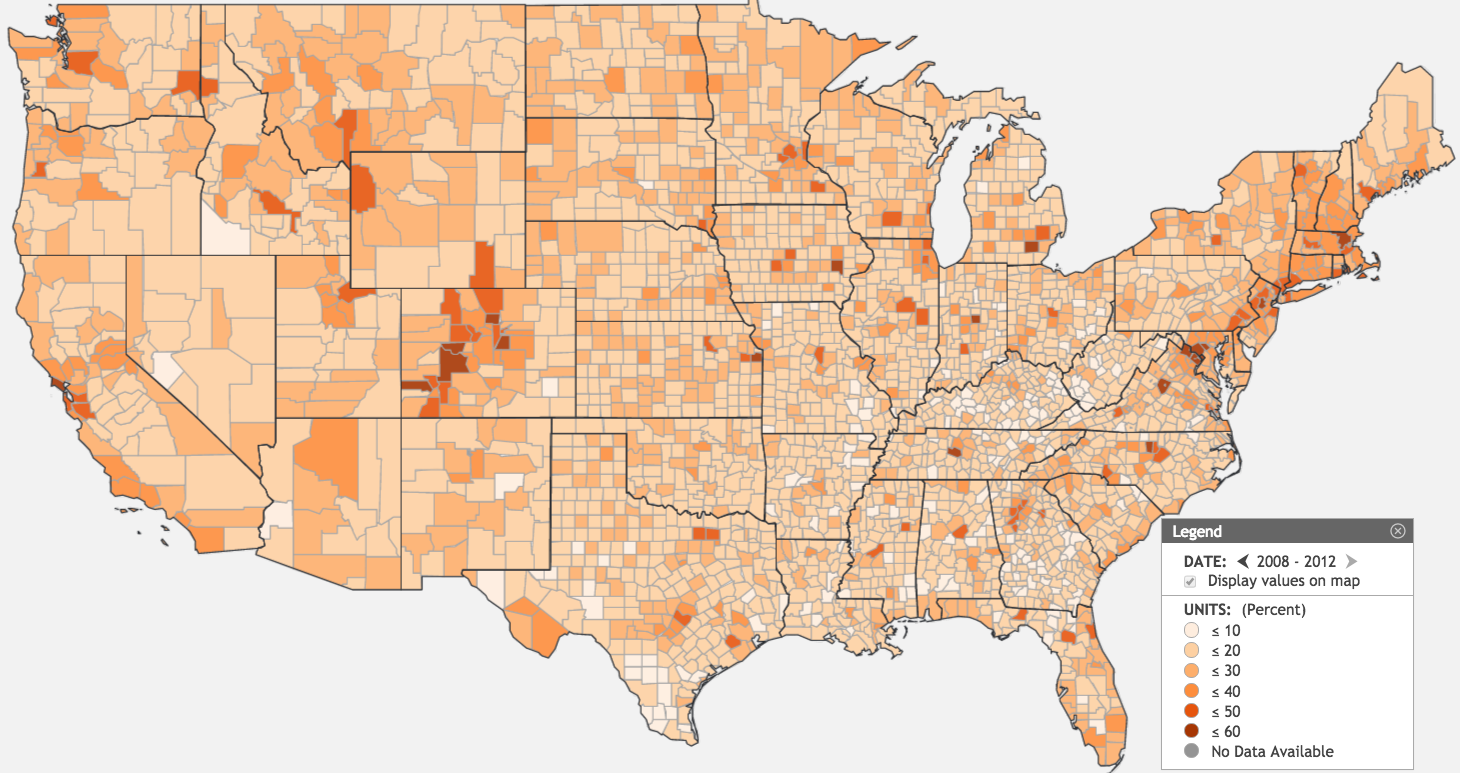
US bachelor's degree by county in the United States

== Education by state ==
- Education in Alabama
- Education in Alaska
- Education in Arizona
- Education in Arkansas
- Education in California
- Education in Colorado
- Education in Connecticut
- Education in Delaware
- Education in Florida
- Education in Georgia
- Education in Hawaii
- Education in Idaho
- Education in Illinois
- Education in Indiana
- Education in Iowa
- Education in Kansas
- Education in Kentucky
- Education in Louisiana
- Education in Maine
- Education in Maryland
- Education in Massachusetts
- Education in Michigan
- Education in Minnesota
- Education in Mississippi
- Education in Missouri
- Education in Montana
- Education in Nebraska
- Education in Nevada
- Education in New Hampshire
- Education in New Jersey
- Education in New Mexico
- Education in New York
- Education in North Carolina
- Education in North Dakota
- Education in Ohio
- Education in Oklahoma
- Education in Oregon
- Education in Pennsylvania
- Education in Rhode Island
- Education in South Carolina
- Education in South Dakota
- Education in Tennessee
- Education in Texas
- Education in Utah
- Education in Vermont
- Education in Virginia
- Education in Washington (state)
- Education in West Virginia
- Education in Wisconsin
- Education in Wyoming

== See also ==
- Educational attainment in the United States
- Education in the United States
- High School in the United States
- Colleges in the United States
- Universities in the United States
- High School Diploma
- Bachelor's Degree
- Master's Degree
