= Passport to Teaching =

The Passport to Teaching is an alternative teacher certification offered by the American Board for Certification of Teacher Excellence.

The Passport to Teaching certification is a program for individuals who wish to pursue a career as a teacher, but do not have a degree in education. The program works with and prepares candidates by offering online courses, exam preparation, and advisors who are current or former teachers. Candidates demonstrate their ability to enter the classroom as an effective teacher by showing proficiency on rigorous ABCTE certification examinations.

Candidates with their Passport can receive initial licensure to teacher in states that accept the certification and subject area.

Currently, the Passport to Teaching certification is accepted in 13 states: Arizona, Arkansas, Idaho, Oklahoma, Utah, Missouri, Mississippi, North Dakota, Tennessee, Florida, South Carolina, Pennsylvania, and New Hampshire.
