= Kelsey Piper =

American journalist and effective altruist

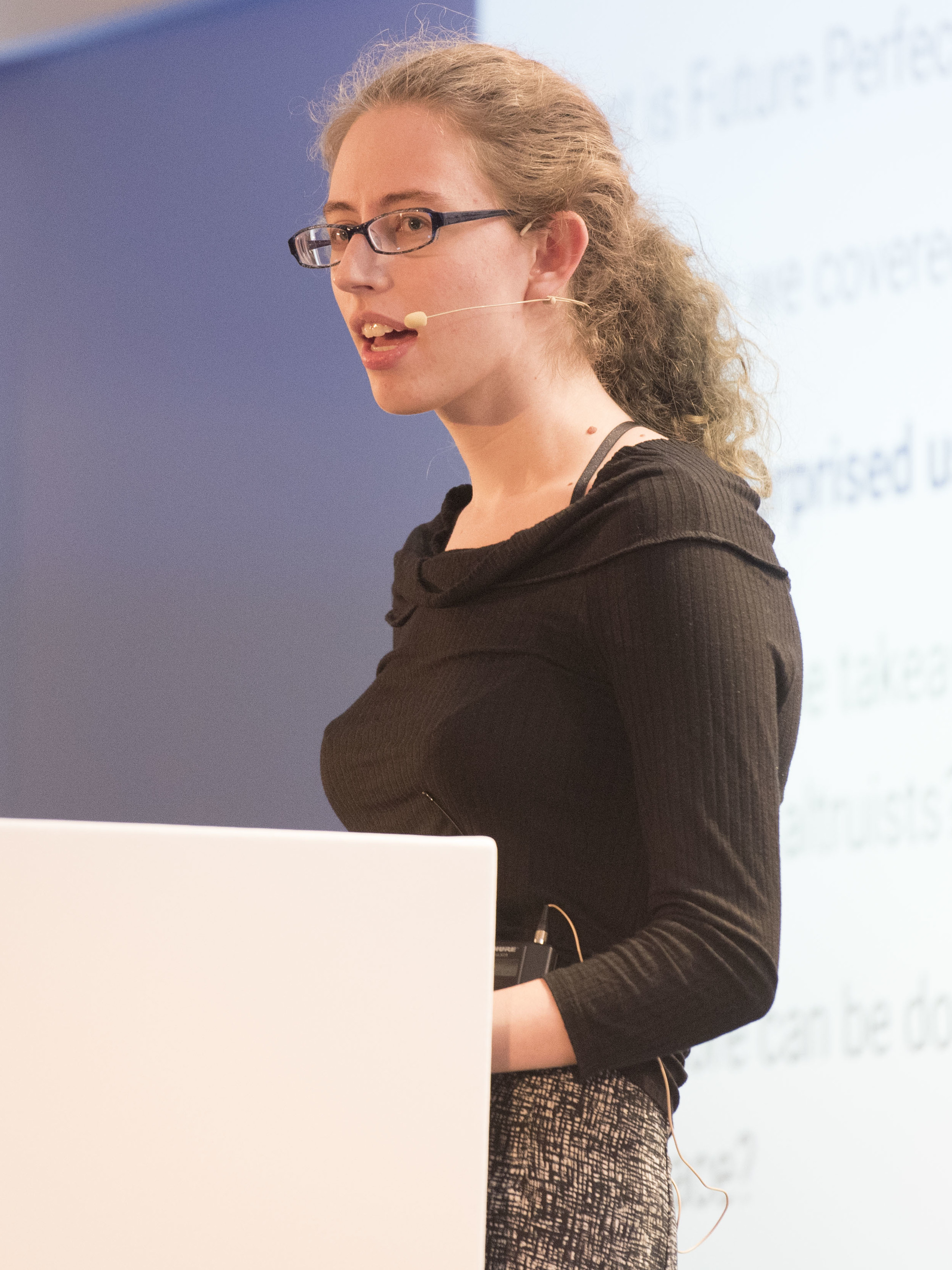
- Piper in 2019
- Born: 1992 (age 33–34)
- Education: Stanford University (Symbolic Systems, 2016)
- Occupation: Journalist
- Notable work: Future Perfect

Kelsey Piper (born c. 1992) is an American journalist who is a staff writer at The Argument. She was previously a staff writer at Vox, where she wrote for the column Future Perfect, which covered a variety of topics from an effective altruism perspective. While attending Stanford University, she founded and ran the Stanford Effective Altruism student organization.

== Education and career ==
Around 2010, while in high school, Piper developed an interest in the rationalist and effective altruism movements. She later studied at Stanford University, where she majored in Symbolic Systems. At Stanford she became a member of Giving What We Can, pledging to donate 30% of her lifetime income to charity, as well as founding the student organization Stanford Effective Altruism. After graduating from Stanford in 2016, Piper worked as the head of the writing team at Triplebyte, before joining Vox as a staff writer.

== Future Perfect ==
Since 2018, Piper has written for the Vox column Future Perfect, which covers "the most critical issues of the day through the lens of effective altruism". Piper is concerned about global catastrophic risks, and treats journalism as a way to popularize these risks and how to mitigate them, aligning with effective altruism's broader concern of identifying the most effective interventions to improve the world. She has also explored the ethical dilemmas and trade-offs involved in prioritizing certain risks over others. Piper argued that the 21st century may be the most pivotal in human history, due to unprecedented existential risks, such as from advanced artificial intelligence and engineered pandemics. She discussed what implications it holds for effective altruism and her own journalism.

Piper discussed the risk of the COVID-19 pandemic in February 2020 and recommended measures such as mask-wearing and social distancing in March of the same year. Since then, she has discussed the societal risk posed by inaccurate study preprints and analyzed the impact of the pandemic on the historical scale, deeming it one of the ten deadliest in human history.

In November 2022, Piper published an article on a direct-message interview with Sam Bankman-Fried after the bankruptcy of FTX.

In May 2024, Piper reported on OpenAI's practice of requiring departing employees to sign lifelong agreement forbidding them from criticizing OpenAI, or even acknowledging the existence of the agreement. According to Piper, OpenAI threatened to cancel departing employees' vested equity (or to prevent them from selling it) if they refused to sign the agreement. OpenAI's CEO, Sam Altman, claimed that he was unaware of the provision about equity cancellation. Piper later published leaked documents and emails challenging this claim.

== Education reporting ==
Beginning in 2023, Piper began writing a series of articles on U.S. K–12 literacy trends, especially the “Mississippi Miracle”. In these pieces, published at The Argument, she examined claims that states such as Mississippi, Alabama, Tennessee, and Louisiana had achieved unusually rapid gains in reading proficiency. Piper analyzed test data, third-grade retention policies, phonics-based reforms, and questions of statistical validity surrounding the National Assessment of Educational Progress.

Her reporting defended the view that the improvements were real and not primarily the result of demographic changes or test manipulation, while also engaging with critics who argued the gains were overstated. She co-authored investigations responding to allegations of “book-cooking”, outlined methodological debates about exclusion rates and accommodations, and assessed how literacy reforms might translate to other states.

== Personal life ==
Piper is a lesbian and lives with her wife and four children in the San Francisco Bay Area.
