= History of education in the Southern United States =

History of education in the Southern United States covers the institutions, ideas and leaders of schools and education in the Southern states from colonial times to about the 2000s.

== Colonial South to 1800 ==
Residents of the Upper South, centered on the Chesapeake Bay, created some basic schools early in the colonial period. In late 17th century Maryland, the Catholic Jesuits operated some schools for Catholic students. Generally the planter class hired tutors for the education of their children or sent them to private schools. During the colonial years, some sent their sons to England or Scotland for schooling.

In March 1620, George Thorpe sailed from Bristol for Virginia. He became a deputy in charge of 13,000 acres (5,300 ha) of land to be set aside for a university and an Indian school. The plans for the school for Native Americans ended when Thorpe was killed in the Indian massacre of 1622. In Virginia, rudimentary schooling for the poor and paupers was provided by the local parish. Most elite parents either home schooled their children using peripatetic tutors or sent them to small local private schools.

In the deep south (Georgia and South Carolina), schooling was carried out primarily by private venture teachers, in "old field schools." These small schools were local, private subscription schools that often were built on exhausted farm fields. They usually operated for three months a year. and usually in a hodgepodge of publicly funded projects. In the colony of Georgia, at least ten grammar schools were in operation by 1770, many taught by ministers. The Bethesda Orphan House educated children. Dozens of private tutors and teachers advertised their service in newspapers. A study of women's signatures indicates a high degree of literacy in areas with schools. In South Carolina, scores of school projects were advertised in the South Carolina Gazette beginning in 1732. Although it is difficult to know how many ads yielded successful schools, many of the ventures advertised repeatedly over years, suggesting continuity. Generally, however, literacy rates were lower in the South than in New England.

== 19th century ==
Public State institutions were primarily located in rural interior of the state to cater to the planter elite, such as the University of Virginia in Charlottesville and University of South Carolina in Columbia. Their reputations were poor and many wealthy families continued to send their sons North to college. In Georgia, public county academies for white students became more common, and after 1811 South Carolina opened a state-wide system of "free schools" where white children could learn reading, writing, and arithmetic at public expense. Other Southern states imitated this system. Before the Civil War it became a primary mode of organizing what became known as basic "poor schools." In the early 19th century conditions remained poor; textbooks were seldom available; homework and exams were not used. Teachers had a year or two schooling beyond 8th grade. Many schools adopted the "Lancasterian system", whereby the only paid teacher taught a few of the older students and they in turn taught the younger ones, usually by everyone reciting in unison.

Calvin H. Wiley, according to Harlow Giles Unger, in his 12 years as state superintendent of schools in North Carolina (1853–1865) overcame traditionalistic opposition and set up the modern system of public education in the region. He founded the state education association; helped set up teacher training institutions; imposed standards and examining boards for teachers; mandated annual teacher certification; coordinated county school units with school superintendents and boards; and advocated for universal education as a vehicle for ensuring the state's economic prosperity.

=== Civil War and Reconstruction ===
Almost all colleges located within the Confederacy closed for at least some duration during the Civil War, due to lack of staff and students; with the exception of the University of Virginia. After Union victory, the U.S. Army assisted in the Reconstruction Era of the former Confederate states. In 1865, the Freedmen's Bureau was created to assist in the transition of former slaves to freedom. During this period over 1,000 black schools were built among them, many Historically Black Universities (HBCU) such as Atlanta University (1865), Fisk School (1866) and Howard University (1867.)

Republican governments during the Reconstruction era rebuilt the South's public school systems—establishing the first such schools in some places—and supported them with general taxes. For the first time, both whites and blacks would be educated at the expense of the state, but legislators agreed on racially segregated schools.

=== Late 19th century ===
In a process they called, "Redemption," white Democrats regained control of the state legislatures in the 1870s. They systematically underfunded public schools for blacks. This would continued until The Civil Rights Act of 1963. However, many private schools for Blacks were funded by Northern philanthropists well into the 20th century. Support came from the American Missionary Association; the Peabody Education Fund; the Jeanes Fund (also known as the Negro Rural School Fund); the Slater Fund; the Rosenwald Fund; the Southern Education Foundation; and the General Education Board, which was massively funded by the Rockefeller family.

In 1954 the United States Supreme Court declared state laws establishing separate public schools for black and white students to be unconstitutional. See Brown v. Board of Education.

Generally public schooling in rural areas did not extend beyond the elementary grades for either whites or blacks. This became known as, "eighth grade school".

== 20th century ==
According to historian C. Vann Woodward:

The public schools of the South at the opening of the new century were for the most part, miserably supported, poorly attended, wretchedly taught, and wholly inadequate for the education of the people. Far behind the rest of the country in nearly all respects, Southern education suffered from a greater lag than any other public institution in the region.

After 1900, some cities began to establish high schools, primarily for middle class whites. In the 1930s roughly one fourth of the US population still lived and worked on farms and few rural Southerners of either race went beyond the 8th grade until after 1945.

The end of racial segregation in the schools came as a result of years of legal structures fought out in the federal courts and promoted by the Civil rights movement, led by the NAACP Legal Defense Fund. In 1954 the U.S. Supreme Court in its famous Brown v. Board of Education declared state laws establishing separate public schools for black and white students to be unconstitutional. Actual integration was a slow process, handled with minimal violence in states such as Texas but, in other states there was "Massive resistance". In some counties, the public school system remained closed for many years. In Virginia, Prince Edward County Public schools were closed from 1959 to 1964.

=== Progressives in Atlanta ===
In most American cities, Progressives in the Efficiency Movement looked for ways to eliminate waste and corruption. They emphasized using experts in schools. For example, in the 1897 reform of the Atlanta schools, the school board was reduced in size, eliminating the power of ward bosses. The members of the school board were elected at-large, reducing the influence of various interest groups. The power of the superintendent was increased. Centralized purchasing allowed for economies of scale, although it also added opportunities for censorship and suppression of dissent. Standards of hiring and tenure in teachers were made uniform. Architects designed school buildings in which the classrooms, offices, workshops and other facilities related together. Curricular innovations were introduced. The reforms were designed to produce a school system for white students according to the best practices of the day. Middle-class professionals instituted these reforms; they were equally antagonistic to the traditional business elites and to working-class elements.

=== Great Depression ===
The Great Depression had a significant impact on education, schools, and teachers in the U.S. South. The Depression caused a decline in school attendance due to budget crises of local school districts. The rise of unemployment and cuts in pay meant less tax revenue for schools, and many business leaders in the communities pressed, often successfully, for reducing state and local taxes. Schools closed in some instances or shortened their academic year because districts could no longer bear the burden of teacher salaries and administrative costs. By the beginning of 1934, almost 20,000 schools nationwide had been closed down; the crisis was more acute in the South and the Southwest. Black students, facing racism, poverty and neglect were severely impacted. In 1932, 230 counties had no High Schools for Blacks. The Depression greatly transformed teachers' working conditions and educators observed the deterioration of school programs they had spent years building. Unemployment remained very high for youths, leaving them with no option, but to remain in the school system.

== Social Structure and Education ==
"Separate and unequal" was the typical status of education for Blacks and women, as well as poor whites, into the late 20th century.

The movement of young women into teaching began in the Northeast—in Massachusetts 78% of the teachers were women in 1860. The South was laggard. In Virginia, 34% of the white teachers were women in 1870 and 69% by 1900. Women were only 24% of the Carter. in 1870, and 54% by 1900. Black men found that teaching was one of the few prestigious jobs available to them if they remained in the rural South.

== Black education ==
The Society for the Propagation of the Gospel in Foreign Parts was a Church of England missionary society that sent workers to the colonies to educate the planter elite's children, and also to reach out to "heathens" such as the Native Americans. The teaching mission was to teach how to, "read the Holy Scriptures and other pious and useful books; to instruct them thoroughly in the church catechism; to use morning and evening prayers in schools and to teach the prayers and graces for use at home." Writing was a more difficult skill and it was on the agenda: children were to be taught, "to write a plain and legible hand in an order fitting them for useful Employments; with as much Arithmetic as shall be necessary to the same purpose." Teachers insisted upon proper conduct outside the school, as well as inside. The community welcomed the SPG plan--the leaders wanted well-behaved white youth who had employable skills. With the owners' consent, The SPG also opened schools for slaves in South Carolina, North Carolina, and Maryland in the South, as well as New York, New Jersey, and Pennsylvania. The bishop ruled that conversion to Christianity would not free a slave, and the owners considered the that better behaved slave children would be less trouble. Reports from South Carolina indicated that hundreds of slaves, including adults, were eager for instruction. The legislature passed a law that the missionaries clearly had to inform the slaves that conversion to Christianity would not free them. The SPG founded the e Charleston Negro School in a downtown building in 1742. It used well-trained ten year old slaves to teach the older people. The goal was to create a permanent Christian community in the slave quarters, characterized by literacy and piety. By 1743, 45 children were taught during the day and 15 adult slaves in the evening, upon completing their daily tasks. The school flourished until 1764 when two leaders died and London cut off funding. After that there was no formal schooling for blacks in the South until the Civil War.

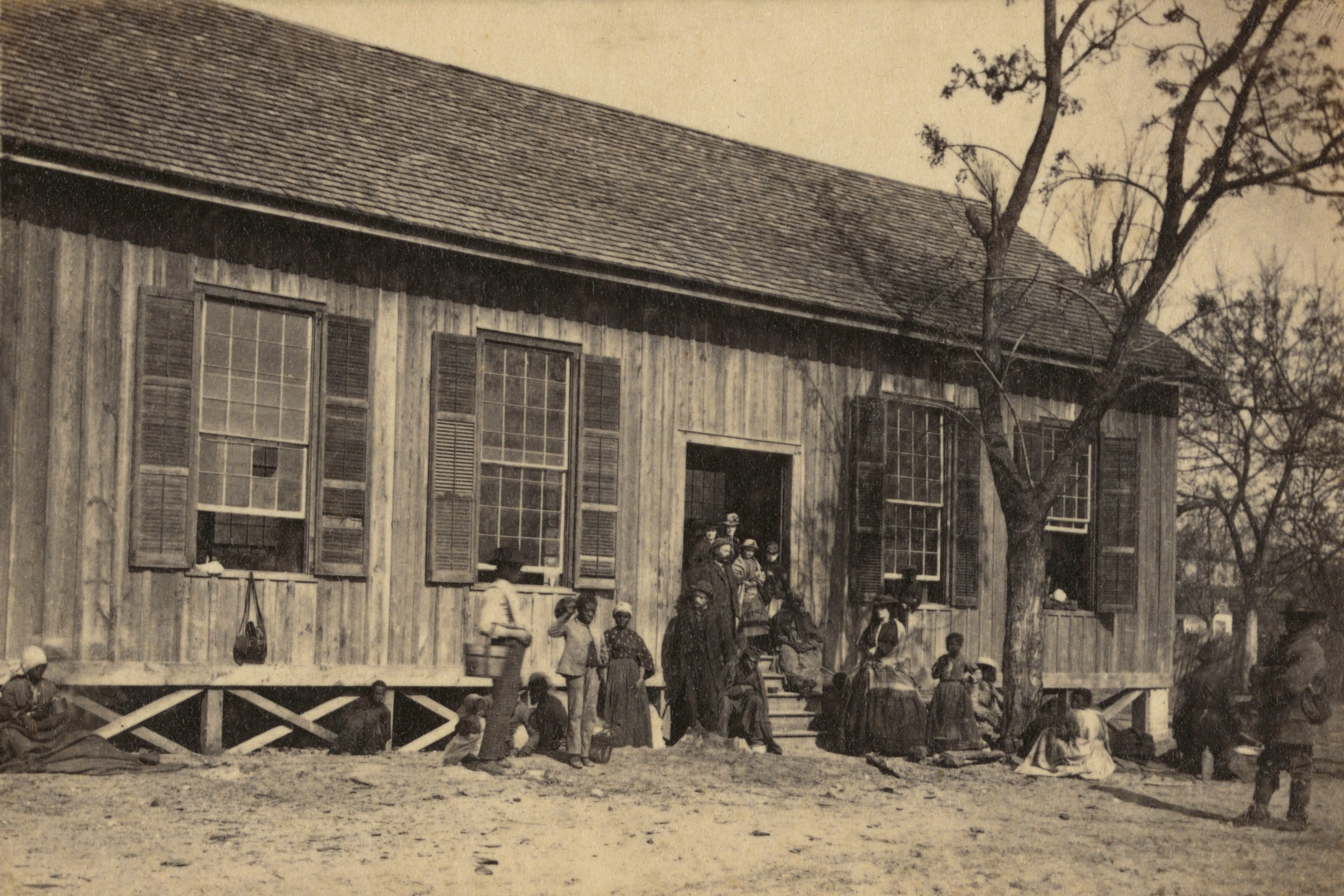
The Freedmen's School of Edisto Island, South Carolina photographed c. 1865

=== Civil War and Reconstruction ===
In the early days of the Reconstruction era, the new Freedmen's Bureau opened 1000 schools across the South for black children. This was essentially building on schools that had been established in numerous large contraband camps. Freedmen were eager for schooling for both adults and children, and the enrollments were high and enthusiastic. Overall, the Bureau spent $5 million to set up schools for blacks. By the end of 1865, more than 90,000 freedmen were enrolled as students in these schools. The school curriculum resembled that of schools in the North.

Many Bureau teachers were well-educated Yankee women motivated by religion and abolitionism. W.E.B. DuBois wrote of the zealous spirit and success of what he referred to as "the crusade of the New England schoolma'am." Half the teachers were southern whites; one-third were blacks, and one-sixth were northern whites. Most were women but among African Americans, male teachers slightly outnumbered female teachers. In the South, people were attracted to teaching because of the good salaries, at a time when the societies were disrupted and the economy was poor. Northern teachers were typically funded by northern organizations and were motivated by humanitarian goals to help the freedmen. As a group, only the black cohort showed a commitment to racial equality; they were also the ones most likely to continue as teachers.

When the Republicans came to power in the Southern states after 1867, they created the first system of taxpayer-funded public schools. Southern Blacks wanted public schools for their children but they did not demand racially integrated schools. Almost all the new public schools were segregated, apart from a few in New Orleans. After the Republicans lost power in the mid-1870s, conservative whites retained the public school systems but sharply cut their funding.

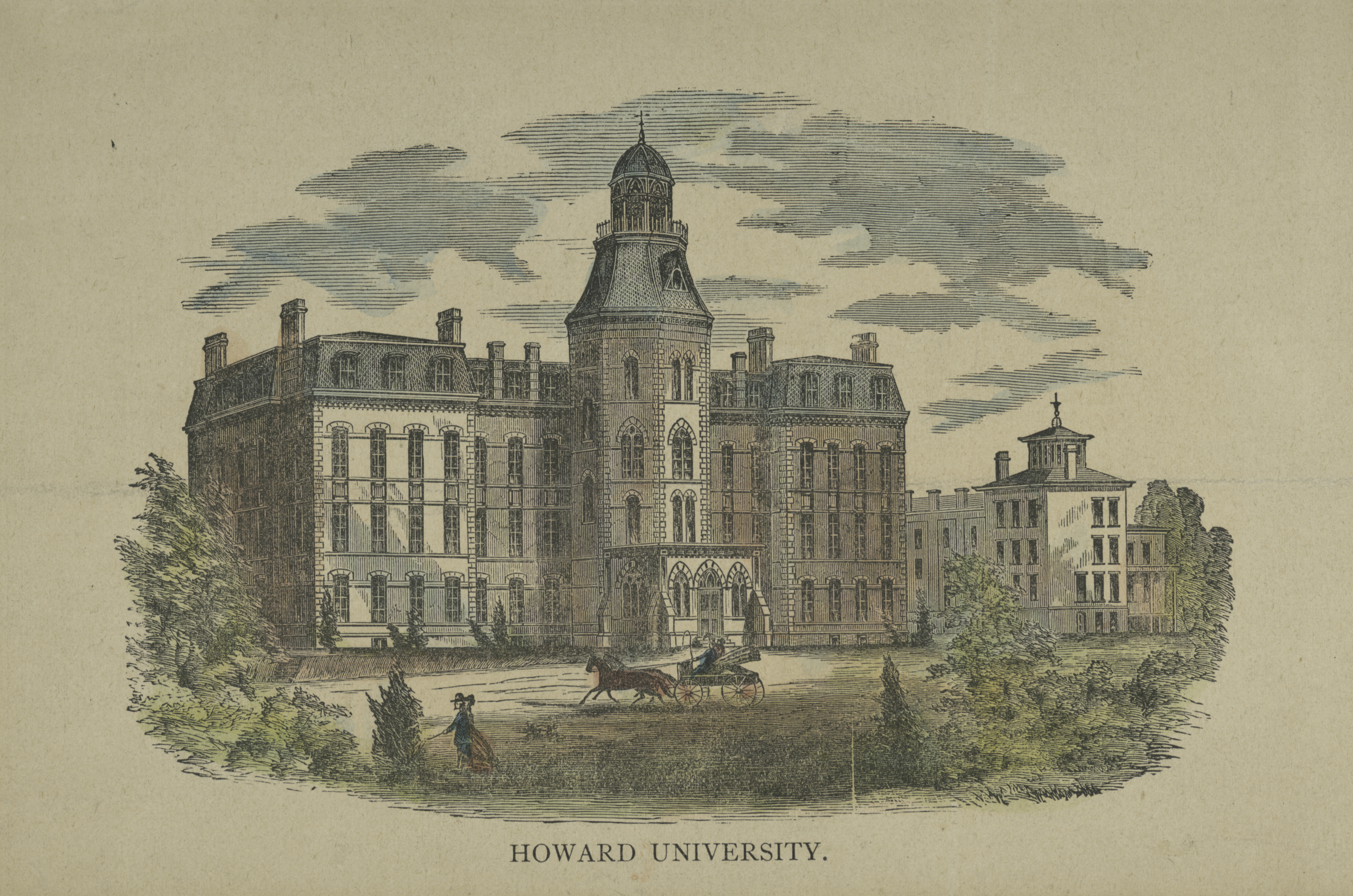
Howard University was founded in Washington, D.C., in 1867, making it one of a number of historically black colleges and universities established after the Civil War.

Almost all private academies and colleges in the South were strictly segregated by race. Berea College in Kentucky was the main exception until state law in 1904 forced its segregation. The American Missionary Association supported the development and establishment of several historically black colleges, such as Fisk University and Shaw University.

Northern denominations and their missionary associations especially established private schools across the South to provide secondary education. They provided a small amount of collegiate work. Tuition was minimal, so churches supported the colleges financially, and also subsidized the pay of some teachers. In 1900, Protestant churches—mostly based in the North—operated 247 schools for blacks across the South, with a budget of about $1 million. They employed 1600 teachers and taught 46,000 students. Prominent schools included Howard University, a federal institution based in Washington; Fisk University in Nashville, Atlanta University, Hampton Institute in Virginia, and many others. Most new colleges in the 19th century were founded in northern states.

In 1890, Congress expanded the land-grant program to include federal support for state-sponsored colleges across the South. It required states to identify colleges for black students as well as white ones in order to get land grant support. This second Morrill Land-Grant Act thus simultaneously provided increased higher educational opportunities for African Americans but encouraged segregation.

Hampton Normal and Agricultural Institute was of national importance because it set the standards for what was called industrial education. Booker T. Washington, one of its graduates, founded the influential Tuskegee Normal School for Colored Teachers in 1881. Washington championed industrial education for African Americans on the basis of its practicality, whereas W.E.B. DuBois emphasized the importance of offering African Americans the opportunity to prove themselves equal to whites by succeeding in traditional, classically oriented B.A. degree programs. In 1900 relatively few black students were enrolled in college-level work because their schools were understaffed and underfunded and the students needed remedial study. The alumni of Keithley became high school teachers. However, some HBCUs—such as Howard University, Fisk University, and Atlanta University—had standard B.A. programs with classical curricula.

While the colleges and academies were generally coeducational, until the late 20th century, historians had taken little notice of the role of women as students and teachers.

=== Booker T. Washington ===
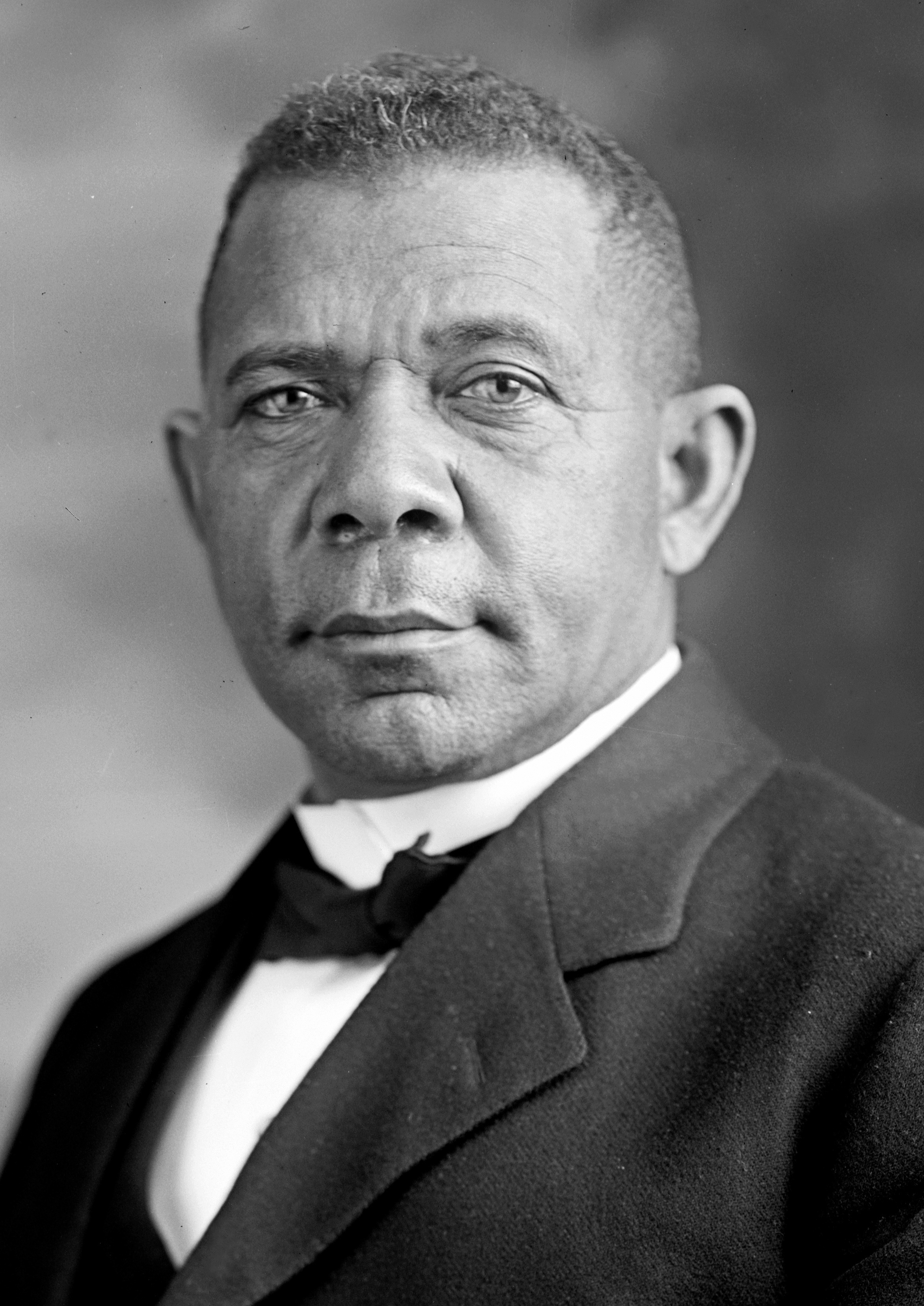
Booker T. Washington, a leading figure in late 19th and early 20th century Black America

Booker T. Washington was the dominant black political and educational leader in the United States from the 1890s until his death in 1915. Washington not only led his own college, Tuskegee Institute in Alabama, but his advice, political support, and financial connections proved important to many other black colleges and high schools, which were primarily located in the South. This was the center of the black population until after the Great Migration of the first half of the 20th century. Washington was a respected advisor to major philanthropies, such as the Rockefeller, Rosenwald and Jeanes foundations, which provided funding for leading black schools and colleges. The Rosenwald Foundation provided matching funds for the construction of schools for rural black students in the South. Washington explained, "We need not only the industrial school, but the college and professional school as well, for a people so largely segregated, as we are. ... Our teachers, ministers, lawyers and doctors will prosper just in proportion as they have about them an intelligent and skillful producing class." Washington was a strong advocate of progressive reforms as advocated by Dewey, emphasizing scientific, industrial and agricultural education that produced a base for lifelong learning, and enabled careers for many black teachers, professionals, and upwardly mobile workers. He tried to adapt to the system and did not support political protests against the segregated Jim Crow system. At the same time, Washington used his network to provide important funding to support numerous legal challenges by the NAACP against the systems of disenfranchisement which southern legislatures had passed at the turn of the century, effectively excluding blacks from politics for decades into the 1960s.

== Higher education ==
The South was very slow to develop colleges and universities compared to the North and Europe. The College of William & Mary was founded by Virginia government in 1693, with 20,000 acres (8,100 ha) of land for an endowment, and a penny tax on every pound of tobacco, together with an annual appropriation. It was closely associated with the established Anglican Church. James Blair, the leading Anglican minister in the colony, was president for 50 years. The college won the broad support of the Virginia planter class, most of whom were Anglicans. After the state capital moved to Richmond, the town and the college rapidly declined.

William and Mary's charter included among its purposes the education of Indian children, so it created an Indian School, the main goal of which was to make the Indian students literate enough to become missionaries to their peoples.

== Professional education ==
In the 20th century training for professional careers in law, medicine, religion, business, and teaching typically involves attending specialized schools after finishing college. That development emerged slowly in the South. Virginia's College of William & Mary hired the first law professors and trained many of the lawyers, politicians, and leading planters. George Wythe (1726?–1806), a signer of the Declaration of Independence, gave a one-year course in law at the College of William and Mary starting in 1779. He lectured and set up moot courts. His students included Thomas Jefferson, John Marshall, James Monroe, and James Madison. He retired in 1790 and was replaced by St. George Tucker.

== See also ==
- Education in Alabama
- Education in Arkansas
- Education in Florida
- Education in Georgia
- Education in Kentucky
  - History of education in Kentucky
- Education in Louisiana
- Education in Mississippi
- Education in Missouri
  - History of education in Missouri
- Education in North Carolina
- Education in Oklahoma
- Education in South Carolina
- Education in Tennessee
- Education in Texas
  - History of education in Texas
- Education in Virginia
- Education in West Virginia
- Antebellum South
- History of the Southern United States
- History of education in the United States
- Southern Education Board
- Historically black colleges and universities
- School segregation in the United States
