= VVA =

VVA may refer to:

- Vietnam Veterans of America
- Versatile Vehicle Architecture, an automotive design concept
- Virtual Virginia, Virginia's online education system
- Vulvovaginal atrophy, a symptom of reduced estrogen
- Variable Valve Actuation, Yamaha's nomenclature for variable valve timing
