= Education in North Carolina =

Education in North Carolina covers public and private education at all levels since the colonial era.

== History ==
The history of education in North Carolina reflects the state's development from its rural, agrarian beginnings to its position in the modern era as a major industrial and technological state.

Early Education: In the colonial period, education was primarily provided by private tutors or religious institutions. The first public school in North Carolina was established in New Bern in 1749.

Rise of Public Education: The 19th century saw the rise of public education in North Carolina, with the state's first public school system established in 1839. However, public education was not available to all children, particularly those in the mountains, the rural areas and African American children

Education Reform: In the early 20th century, North Carolina underwent a period of education reform, with Governor Charles B. Aycock leading efforts to improve teacher training, school facilities, and curriculum. This period also saw the establishment of the North Carolina Community College System

Integration and Desegregation: The Civil Rights Movement of the 1950s and 1960s brought about significant changes in education in North Carolina, including the integration of schools and the desegregation of higher education institutions

Modernization and Innovation: Since the 1980s, North Carolina has continued to modernize and innovate in education, with a focus on technology, teacher training, and accountability. The state has also implemented various reforms, such as the Read to Achieve program, to improve student outcomes

=== Before 1900 ===
Education was a low priority in the colonial era. Wealthy families provided tutors for the white children on the plantation. Some local Anglican Churches had small schools. A few private academies operated in the towns, providing the 3R basics: reading, writing and 'rithmetic. One teacher handled grades 1 to 8 in a single room. The first small public school opened in New Bern in 1749, designed as a charity for poor families who could not afford tuition at an academy. In the early 19th century conditions remained poor; textbooks were seldom available; homework and exams were not used. Teachers had a year or two schooling beyond 8th grade. Many schools adopted the "Lancasterian system", whereby the only paid teacher taught a few of the older students and they in turn taught the younger ones, usually by everyone reciting in unison.

By 1852 there were forty-two private academies in operation, and 30 private colleges, with most of them surviving only a few years. There was no system of public schools, and the one public university at Chapel Hill was a small operation with 230 students in 1850. Dramatic changes happened in the 1850s, under the leadership of Calvin H. Wiley, a Whig modernizer. According to Harlow Giles Unger, in 12 years as state superintendent of education, 1853 to 1865, Wiley overcame traditionalistic opposition among small farmers who saw no need to waste their children's time on schooling. Wiley appealed to the Whig vision progress in establishing the South's first modern system of public education. He founded the state education association to drum up local support; helped set up teacher training institutions; imposed standards and examining boards for teachers; mandated annual teacher certification; coordinated county school units with school superintendents and boards; and above all he crusaded for universal white education as a vehicle for ensuring the state's economic prosperity. In statistical terms the North Carolina schools were growing. According to Wiley's reports, from 1853 to 1869 the number of schools grew 23% to 3,082; enrollment climbed 25% to 119,000; the number of licensed teachers tripled from 800 to 2,752; and public expenditures soared 85% to $278,000. Enrollment doubled at the university, reaching 456 in 1858, making it second only to Yale. Most schools largely closed down during the Civil War of 1861-1865 as many teachers and students enlisted, and soaring inflation ruined private endowments.

=== 20th century ===
North Carolina was the leader among all the southern states in promoting public education, as well as higher education, throughout the 20th century. In the 1900 gubernatorial election, Charles Aycock launched his successful crusade for upgrading public education. Aycock increased funding for schools, raised teacher salaries, and oversaw the construction of over a thousand new schoolhouses. He preached that education was essential for social and economic progress in the state. All schools were segregated, and Black schools had much worse facilities, but they also were improved,

The influential educational equity lawsuit Leandro v. North Carolina was filed in 1994.

=== Since 2000 ===
In comparison with all the states, North Carolina ranked poorly in early 21st century. In 2021 in Educastion Week Chance-for-Success Index it ranked #28 out of the 50 states and DC. This index combines information from 13 indicators that span a person’s life from cradle to career. In 2014 it ranked as average in most indicators. It was a poor #42 in finance, and a good #10 in "Standards, assessments, and accountability."

== 21st century: Primary and secondary education ==
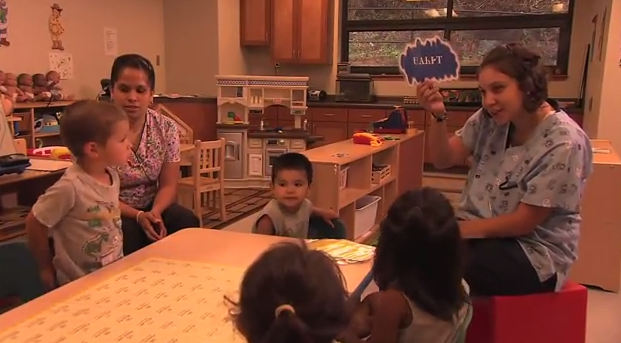
A lesson at New Kituwah Academy on the Qualla Boundary in North Carolina. This bilingual language immersion school, operated by the Eastern Band of Cherokee Indians, teaches the same curriculum as other state elementary schools

Elementary and secondary public schools are overseen by the North Carolina Department of Public Instruction. The North Carolina Superintendent of Public Instruction is the secretary of the North Carolina State Board of Education, but the board, rather than the superintendent, holds most of the legal authority for making public education policy. In 2009, the board's chairman also became the "chief executive officer" for the state's school system. North Carolina has 115 public school systems, each of which is overseen by a local school board. A county may have one or more systems within it. The largest school systems in North Carolina are the Wake County Public School System, Charlotte-Mecklenburg Schools, Guilford County Schools, Winston-Salem/Forsyth County Schools, and Cumberland County Schools. In total there are 2,425 public schools in the state, including over 200 charter schools. North Carolina Schools were segregated until the Brown v. Board of Education trial and the release of the Pearsall Plan.

Previously the SAT was the dominant university entrance examination students took. In 2004 76% of NC high school students took the SAT. In 2012 state law changed which required 11th grade students to take the ACT. The SAT testing rate fell to 46% in 2019. Because students now can take that test for free, the ACT became the dominant university entrance examination. This also caused SAT average scores to rise, as in 1996 North Carolina was 48th nationally in SAT scores, but the profile of students taking the SAT has gotten smaller. In 2024, North Carolina's high school graduation rate was 87%, though just 36% met the state's benchmarks for "college and career readiness."

As of 2025, North Carolina's public schools rank 48th in the nation in per-student spending. The state ranks 39th for starting teacher pay ($42,500 on average) and 43rd for average teacher pay ($58,300). The state also has the fourth-highest out-of-pocket spending on classroom supplies by teachers.

In April 2026, the Leandro case was dismissed, with the North Carolina Supreme Court ruling that the courts lacked authority to compel funding of the proposed remedy.

== Higher education ==
In 1795, North Carolina opened the first public university in the United States—the University of North Carolina (now named the University of North Carolina at Chapel Hill). More than 200 years later, the University of North Carolina system encompasses 16 public universities including North Carolina State University, North Carolina A&T State University, North Carolina Central University, the University of North Carolina at Chapel Hill, the University of North Carolina at Greensboro, East Carolina University, Western Carolina University, Winston-Salem State University, the University of North Carolina at Asheville, the University of North Carolina at Charlotte, the University of North Carolina at Pembroke, University of North Carolina at Wilmington, Elizabeth City State University, Appalachian State University, Fayetteville State University, and UNC School of the Arts, and 1 public, boarding high school, the North Carolina School of Science and Mathematics. Along with its public universities, North Carolina has 58 public community colleges in its community college system. The largest university in North Carolina is currently North Carolina State University, with more than 34,000 students.

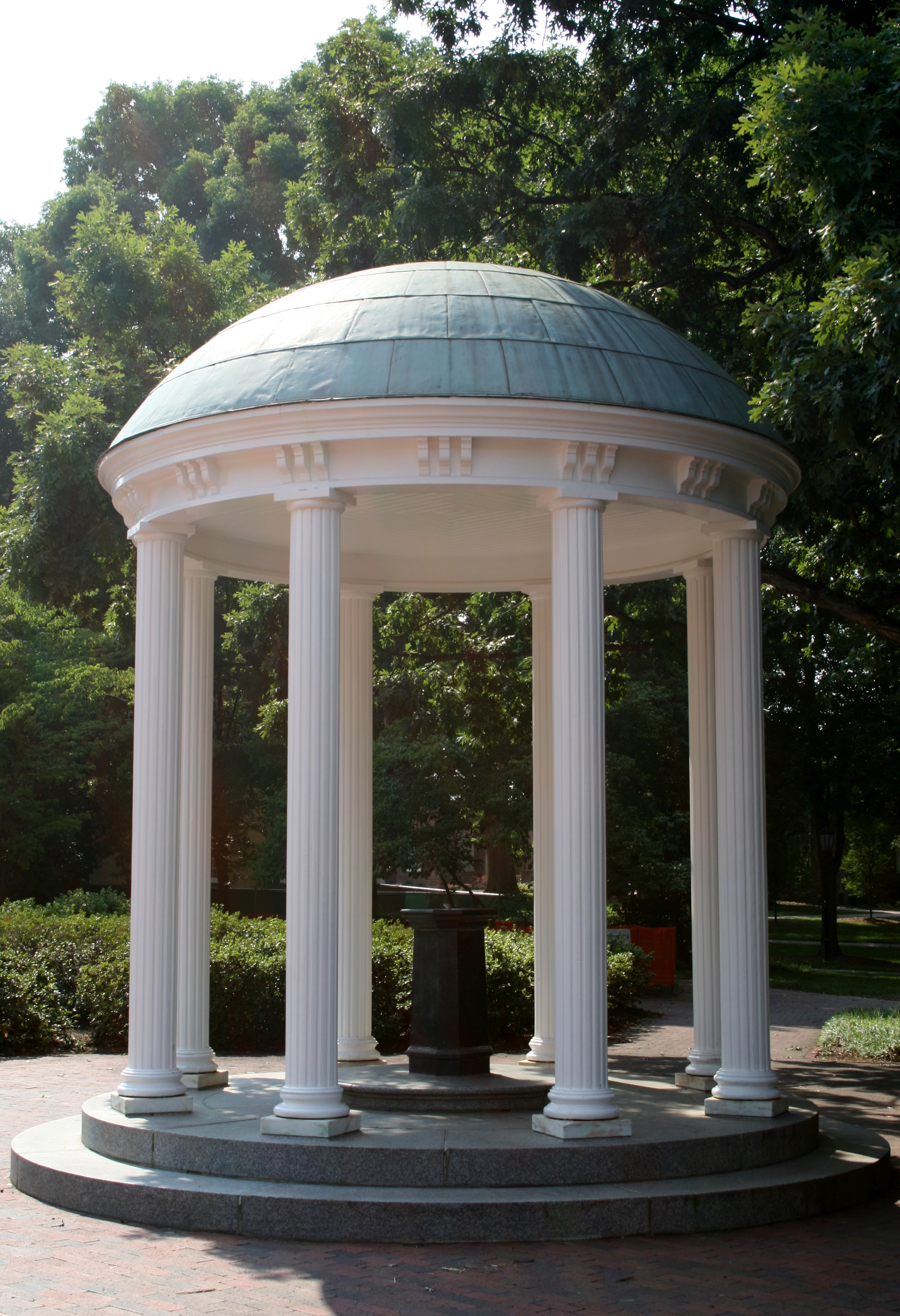
Old Well at UNC-Chapel Hill

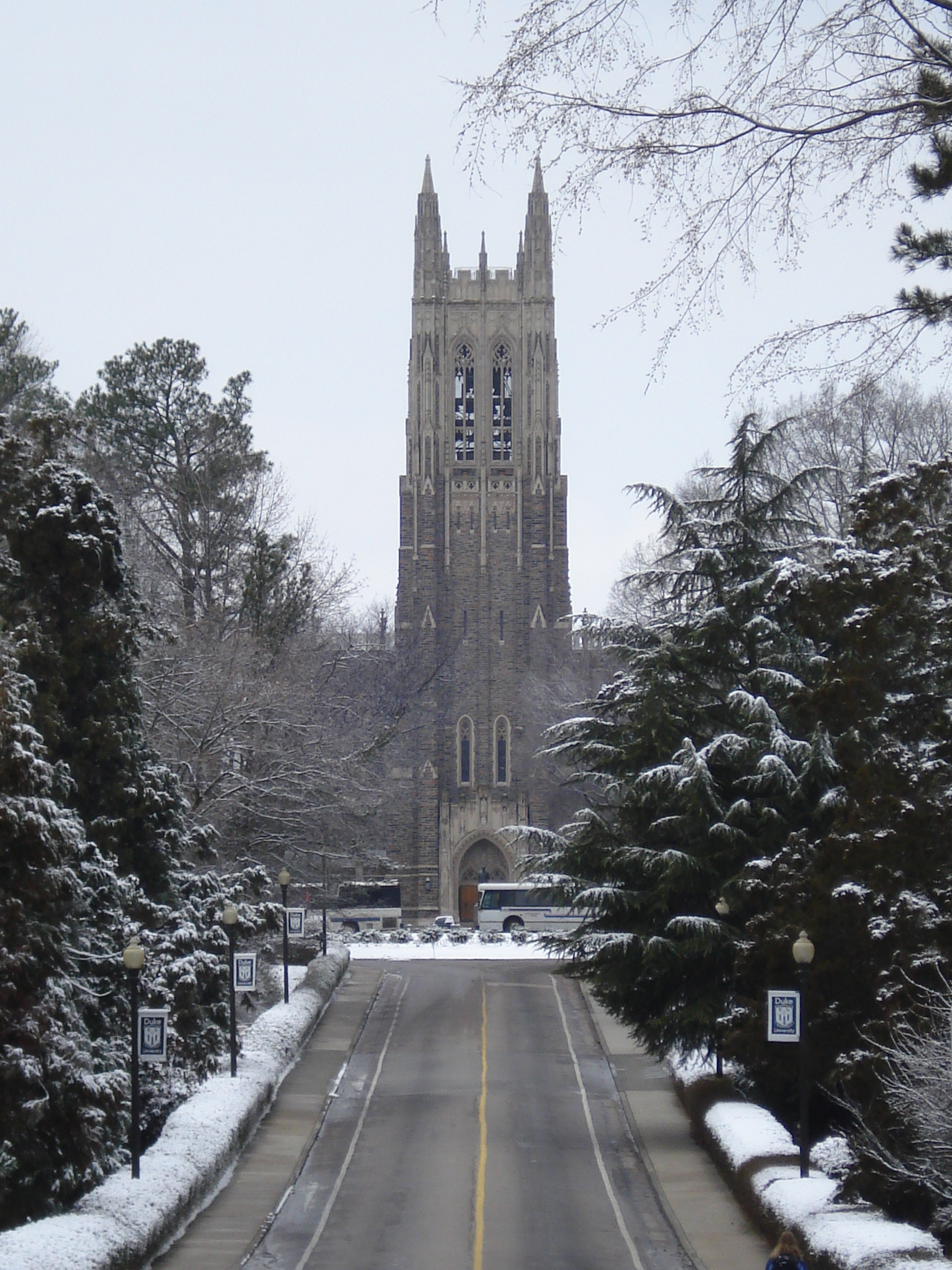
Duke Chapel at Duke University

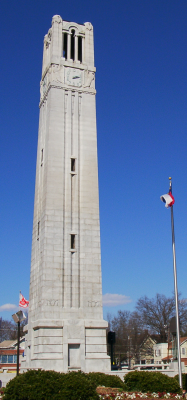
Memorial Bell Tower at NC State

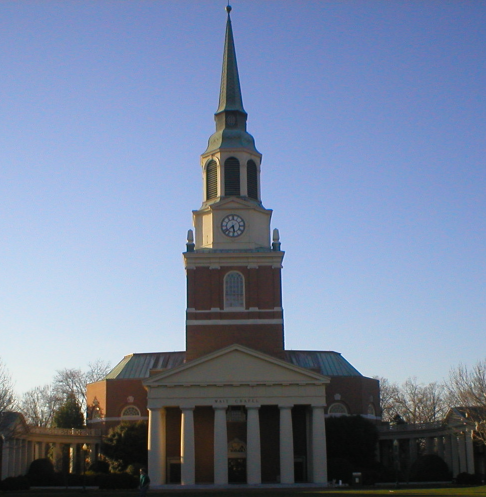
Wait Chapel at Wake Forest University

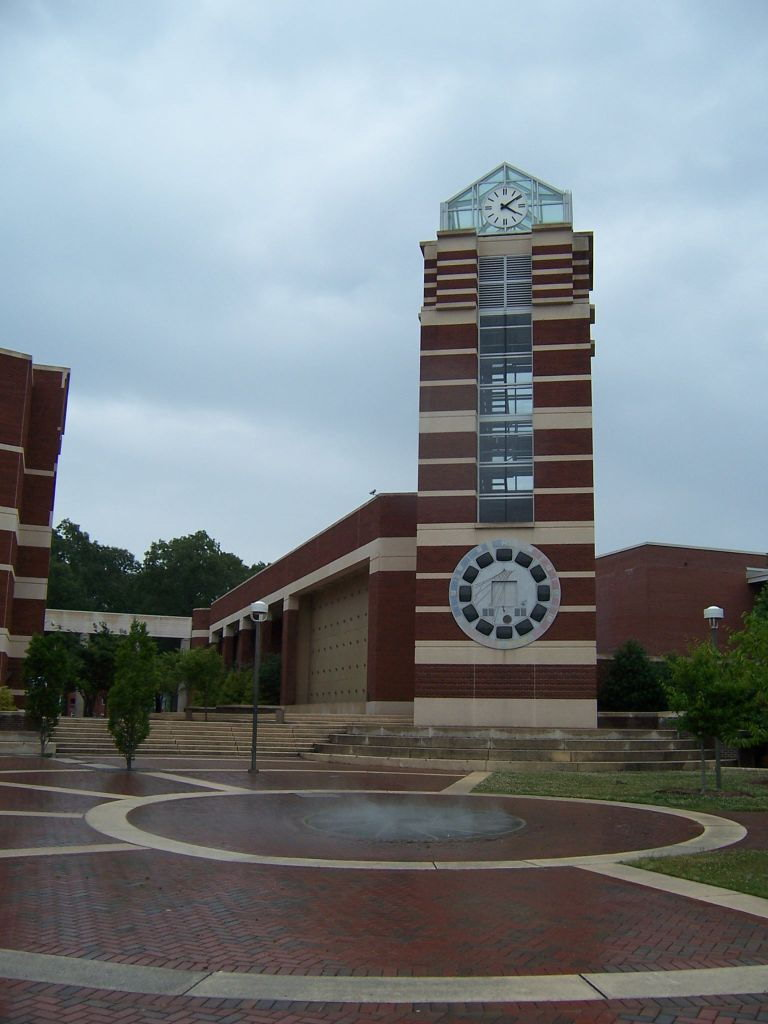
The Joyner Library clock tower at East Carolina University

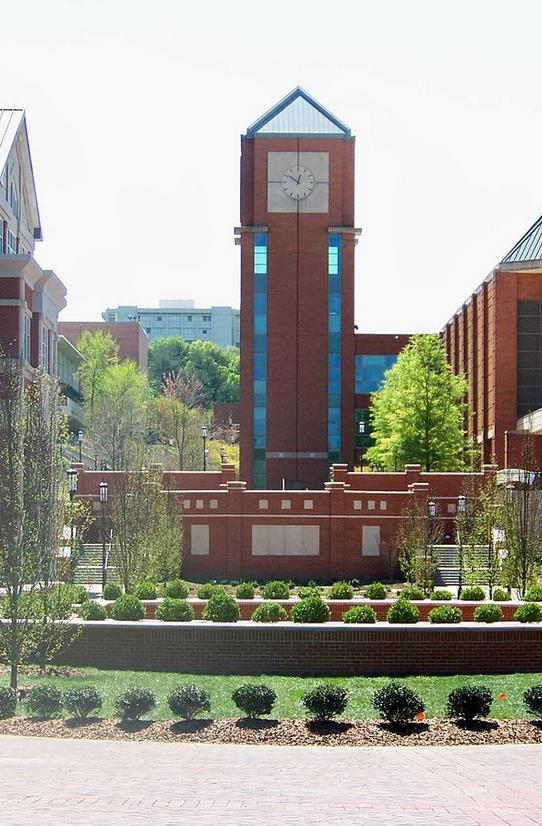
The New Quad at UNC Charlotte

=== Private higher education ===
North Carolina is also home to many well-known private colleges and universities. They include Duke University, Wake Forest University, Pfeiffer University, Lees-McRae College, Davidson College, Barton College, North Carolina Wesleyan College, Elon University, Guilford College, Livingstone College, Salem College, Shaw University (the first HBCU (historically black college or university) in the South), Laurel University, William Peace University, Meredith College, Methodist University, Belmont Abbey College (the only Catholic college in the Carolinas), Campbell University, University of Mount Olive, Montreat College, High Point University, Lenoir-Rhyne University and Wingate University.

North Carolina is also home to the oldest and largest folk school in the United States, the John C. Campbell Folk School.

== See also ==
- History of North Carolina
- History of education in the Southern United States
