= American Board for Certification of Teacher Excellence =

Program to certify subject experts as teachers

The American Board for Certification of Teacher Excellence, often referred to as the American Board, was launched with a $5 million federal grant from the U.S. Department of Education in 2001. The non-partisan, non-profit organization's mission is to certify subject experts, experienced professionals, career changers, and military veterans as teachers and was endorsed by U.S. Education Secretary Rod Paige. Shawn Arévalo McCollough serves as the President and chief executive officer.

The online, alternative teaching certification program is approved in Florida, Idaho, Mississippi, Missouri, New Hampshire, Ohio, Oklahoma, North Dakota, Pennsylvania, South Carolina, Tennessee, Arkansas, and Utah, and was launched in Arizona as the Arizona Center for Teacher Preparation in 2013. Former Arizona Governor Jan Brewer endorsed the program, which addresses the shortage of math and science teachers in the state.

== Mission ==
The American Board is dedicated to preparing, certifying, and supporting individuals who want to improve their communities by becoming a teacher. The training and certification program is designed to inspire career changers to become a teacher and give them a rigorous and efficient process to achieve their goals.

== How it works ==
The program is entirely online and self-paced. Candidates have 12 months to complete the program, though the average amount of time it takes most candidates is between 7 and 10 months. A bachelor's degree is required for acceptance into the American Board teaching certification program, and participants must pass a background check. Candidates enrolled in the program study for and take two certification exams- one that covers Professional Teaching Knowledge (PTK) and one that covers subject area knowledge. The program is online, giving candidates the flexibility to work towards earning their certification on their own time. Once candidates earned their certification, they will receive their Passport to Teaching.

== Acceptance of certifications ==
American Board certification is recognized (as of 08/2025) in Arizona, Florida, Idaho, Indiana, Mississippi, Missouri, Montana, Nebraska, North Dakota, Ohio, Oklahoma, Pennsylvania, South Carolina, West Virginia, and Wisconsin. Many charter and private schools nationwide also recognize the certification. Certification areas are elementary education, English, mathematics, general science, biology, physics, chemistry, U.S. history, world history and special education. Availability of certification areas and requirements vary by state.

== History ==
The American Board was founded in 2001 with a grant from the U.S. Department of Education. Developed on the foundation that highly trained and skilled professionals should have the opportunity to pursue a career in teaching, the American Board was created with a mission to give enable qualified individuals a flexible and affordable path to teacher certification in their state.

The first state to accept the American Board certification for its public schools was Pennsylvania, when the State Board of Education adopted it in November 2002. An early study of the American Board teacher certification by Mathematica Policy Research found the program to be enrolling and screening increasing numbers of candidates with the average age of nearly 40, suggesting candidates are primarily career changers with more work experience than other entry-level teachers. Most candidates were able to find teaching positions soon after finishing the program.

In October 2003, U.S. Education Secretary Rod Paige announced the American Board would receive a $35 million grant from the U.S. Department of Education for its continued development of a fast-track route into the teaching profession.

The Idaho State Board of Education approved the American Board program as a route to a full teacher license in November 2003. Idaho Governor Dirk Kempthorne said should he decide to become a teacher after politics, he would use the American Board program to become a certified teacher.

The Florida State Board of Education approved the American Board program in June 2004. Florida Governor Jeb Bush was a supporter, and President George H. W. Bush received his teacher certification through an alternative program.

The Utah House Standing Committee introduced HB0110 and, although it did not pass, the American Board program was approved in November 2004 by the Utah State Board of Education.

In December 2004, the New Hampshire Commissioner of Education approved the American Board program.

The Mississippi Professional Standards Board approved the program in July 2006. Governor Haley Barbour said, "In the wake of Hurricane Katrina, Mississippi faces years of recovery and rebuilding. To ensure that we accomplish our goals, Mississippi communities are working together to improve our schools so that every child in Mississippi has an opportunity to succeed. First and foremost, we must recruit the very best teachers for our students."

In 2006, the U.S. Conference of Mayors adopted alternative certification as a pathway to teaching and cited the American Board.

South Carolina House Bill 3476 was signed into law on June 13, 2007, accepting American Board certification. Governor Mark Sanford said the program would "make a real impact in getting more qualified teachers in our classrooms, and we're pleased to welcome this program to our state."

Missouri Governor Matt Blunt signed Senate Bill 1066 on May 1, 2008, allowing American Board certificate holders to practice there. The Governor said, "Under the old system, Bill Gates couldn’t teach a class in computer software in a Missouri high school. This bill allows experienced professionals to become certified teachers."

The Oklahoma House passed Senate Bill 582 with a unanimous vote of 99 to zero in April 2009, and it was soon signed into law, making Oklahoma the ninth American Board state.

In July 2009, the American Board announced that the organization's initial grant had drawn to a close and it had reached a financial position that will allow the organization to continue to operate without requesting an extension of these government funds.

The Arizona Center for Teacher Preparation was launched in 2013. Then Arizona Governor Jan Brewer endorsed the program, which addresses the shortage of math and science teachers in the state.

== Financial aid ==
The American Board for Certification of Teacher Excellence provides reduced enrollment pricing for those who fall within the parameters of the Federal Reduced Lunch Rate Act, which is based on household size, and combined income.
