= Shawn Arévalo McCollough =

American educator (born 1971)

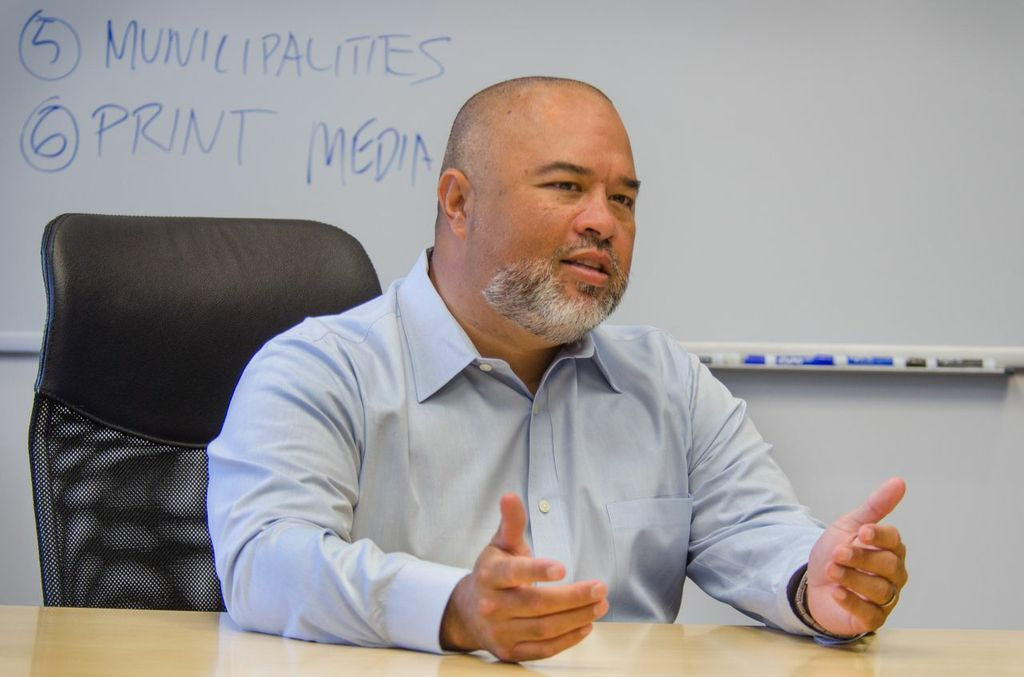
- Shawn McCollough

Shawn Arévalo McCollough (born 1971) is president and CEO of the American Board for Certification of Teacher Excellence in Washington, DC. A former superintendent of schools, principal, and teacher, McCollough's reform efforts have been recognized by George W. Bush, and U.S. Secretary of Education Arne Duncan, U.S. Secretary of Education Margaret Spellings and U.S. Secretary of Education Rod Paige.

== Early life and education ==
McCollough was born in Chicago of Filipino parents and grew up in Columbia, SC. McCollough received his Bachelor of Arts in Sociology from the University of South Carolina and a Masters of Education from Georgia Southern University.

== Career ==
Before leading the American Board for Certification of Teacher Excellence, McCollough served as a public schools administrator. He began his career as a classroom teacher and worked his way up through the ranks to being a superintendent. According to McCollough, “It just takes hard work, commitment, and accountability... No one reform will fit all problems, but the one thing I see district to district, school to school, is the need for leadership." Featured in Cage Busting Leadership, a 2013 book by Frederick Hess, McCollough is quoted in the chapter “The Chicago Way” saying, “Ultimately, you need leaders who are willing to stand in the fire and fight for what they know is morally right for kids, families, and communities.”

=== Nogales Unified School District ===
McCollough most recently served as superintendent of the Nogales Unified School District in Arizona. He joined the district in July 2008, and during his tenure, U.S. Secretary of Education Arne Duncan called McCollough “the next generation of leadership who is going to help lead the country where we need to go.”

McCollough implemented an aggressive reorganization. Faced with millions in budget cuts, he was able to utilize dramatic restructuring and attrition, in order to save jobs. McCollough cut $7 million from the annual budget without layoffs by redeploying central-office staff to positions working directly with students and families. In an editorial about changes being implemented by McCollough, the writer recalls having a conversation with McCollough when "a local businessman interrupted us to introduce himself to the NUSD No. 1 schools superintendent. 'Don’t let up,' he told him. 'Don’t back down.'” In May 2009, the School Board extended McCollough's contract through June 2012.

McCollough applied the use of measurable achievement targets that led 90 percent of schools to make Adequate Yearly Progress (AYP) and 80 percent of the schools with increasing test scores. By implementing a clinical approach to curriculum, instruction, and assessment, teachers were given objectives and provided support that lead to tremendous gains in student achievement. NUSD students raised their scores in 17 of 21 areas with the most dramatic gains in7th grade math and 5th grade reading, where 13 percent more students passed or exceeded the standard. The approach led to sustainable growth in student achievement. NUSD put into effect an open enrollment policy which included accepting students from other districts, and McCollough attributed the continued growth in test scores for increasing student enrollment.

In a vote of confidence for teachers and staff, the City of Nogales voted 70 percent to approve a tax override for NUSD, which school officials declared a resounding victory.

In February 2011, the board unanimously agreed to accept McCollough's resignation. He left NUSD to lead the American Board in Washington, DC. The school board “named Steve Zimmerman interim superintendent from March 7 until June 20, giving the board time to recruit and fill the position on a permanent basis.”

=== Greene County School District ===
In 2006, with a unanimous decision by the School Board, McCollough was named Superintendent of the Greene County School District in Greensboro, Georgia. He was the state's youngest and first Hispanic superintendent.

In October 2007, McCollough was named by Georgia Trend magazine as one of the top 40 under 40 leaders, for his no excuses approach in fixing “problems that plague school districts.” The district was in crisis, as it was struggling with some of the lowest test scores in Georgia and had recently come under sanction by the State Department of Education because of a multi-million dollar deficit. McCollough established accountability targets and slashed spending.

In February, 2008, the Greene County Board of Education voted unanimously to approve a precedent setting single gender plan, which would divide boys and girls into separate gender academies, in order to combat chronic low test scores and teen pregnancy rates. McCollough stated a need for immediate change that would “raise test scores and graduation rates.” In a CNN interview McCollough said, “Our kids are in a state of crisis and our school district has to be reformed if we're going to save them and get them across the finish line.” After community resistance, two school board members reversed their positions and lobbied against the proposed gender changes—several weeks later the school board revised the proposed plan.

After leading the district out of probation, building a budget surplus, and implementing a standards-based curriculum that resulted in the district's highest test scores, McCollough accepted an offer to lead the Nogales Unified School District in Arizona.

=== Maricopa County Regional School District ===
McCollough became Superintendent of the Maricopa County Regional School District in Arizona in July 2005. The small inner-city school district in the downtown Phoenix area serves high-poverty, minority students, many of whom are immigrants. During his year in the district, McCollough reorganized personnel and reduced staffing expenses by $1.2 million, and established a grant writing department that raised more than $2.7 million and a foundation that raised in excess of $500,000 in private and corporate donations.

=== Gainesville Elementary School ===
In 2003, McCollough was named Principal of Gainesville Elementary School in Gainesville, Georgia. During the 2004 Republican National Convention acceptance speech, President George W. Bush recognized the high-poverty, mostly Hispanic school and McCollough's efforts: “In northeast Georgia, Gainesville Elementary School is mostly Hispanic and 90% poor — and this year 90% of its students passed state tests in reading and math. The principal expresses the philosophy of his school this way: ‘We don't focus on what we can't do at this school; we focus on what we can do. We do whatever it takes to get kids across the finish line.’ This principal is challenging the soft bigotry of low expectations, and that is the spirit of our education reform, and the commitment of our country: No dejaremos a ningún niño atrás.” The New York Times declared “Gainesville Elementary School and its principal are for real.”

U.S. Secretary of Education Margaret Spellings cited Gainesville Elementary School's efforts in “overcoming language and cultural barriers to get families involved," and the more than 100 home visits and dozens of parent workshops. The Secretary said McCollough was a “warrior for our kids.” It was the second time in less than a year that McCollough's work had been recognized by the U.S. Secretary of Education. Rod Paige had commended the school during his annual back-to-school address at the National Press Club.

During McCollough's tenure, Gainesville Elementary was awarded the distinction of NASA Explorer School in 2004, and designated a National High Flying School by the National Youth-At-Risk Conference in 2005.
