= Public Education in Mississippi =

The education system in Mississippi consists of elementary, middle, and high schools as well as boarding schools, public and private schools, and colleges and universities.

Mississippi has a reputation of having the lowest ranked education system in the United States. In 2008, Mississippi ranked last in academic achievement by the American Legislative Exchange Council's Report Card on Education with the lowest average ACT score and the 6th lowest spending per pupil in the nation. On the other hand, by 2019 Mississippi had significantly narrowed the gap in the National Assessment of Educational Progress, even achieving parity for both reading and mathematics.

Most of the schools in Mississippi are accredited by the Southern Association of Colleges and Schools.

== K-12 ==
=== Mississippi Department of Education ===
The Mississippi Board of Education has nine appointed members, and they appoint the State Superintendent of Education who sets educational policies and oversees the Mississippi Department of Education. The Mississippi Governor appoints one member of the Board of Education from Mississippi's Northern Supreme Court District, one from the Central Supreme Court District, one from the Southern Supreme Court District, one employed school administrator, and one employed public school teacher. The Lieutenant Governor appoints two members-at-large, and the Speaker of the Mississippi House of Representatives appoints two members-at-large.

The Mississippi Board of Education divides the Department of Education into functioning divisions and is responsible for establishing and maintaining their policy system and designing and maintaining curriculum for public school students that prepares them for the work force. They are also responsible for regulating curriculum, teacher standards and certification, student testing, accountability, school accreditation and any other problems that arise in the school system.

=== Demographics ===
In Mississippi, there are 152 school districts consisting of 3 agricultural high schools, 68 county unit districts, and 81 separate district schools.

There are 1,089 elementary and secondary schools with 491,962 students and 33,358 teachers, compared to the national averages of 1,999 schools, 965,991 students, and 63,179 teachers. The pupil to teach ratio in Mississippi is 14.7, compared to the national average of 15.3.

=== Educational Programs ===
The Office of Vocational Education and Workforce Development prepares students for the workforce by providing them with programs to teach them about various fields in business and industry. It is an integrated educational delivery system that provides programs for secondary (middle and high school), postsecondary (college), and short-term adult programs.

Mississippi Public Broadcasting (MPB) was signed on air with its first broadcast on February 1, 1970. It began airing radio programs in 1984. It reaches 2.2 million households in Mississippi, and 127,000 Mississippians listen to its radio programming weekly. 40% of its programming is geared towards children.

=== Specialized Schools ===
The Mississippi School for the Deaf is the state residential school for students who are deaf and hard of hearing. It is located in the state's capital of Jackson, Mississippi, and it was founded in 1854.

The Mississippi School for Mathematics and Science (MSMS) is a public residential school for gifted students located in Columbus, Mississippi on the campus of the Mississippi University for Women. MSMS accepts students from across the state and only enrolls students in the last two years of high school.

== Colleges and Universities ==
In Mississippi, there are 15 public community colleges, 8 private colleges, and 9 public universities. Most of these colleges and universities assess ACT and SAT scores when accepting college graduates.

In 2010, 26,887 Mississippi graduates took the ACT, which is 96% of graduating seniors. The composite score was 18.8, compared to the national average of 21.0. Mississippi graduates received the lowest average ACT score in any state in the nation. The combined average SAT score for Mississippi graduates in 2010 was 1666, and 3% of Mississippi graduates took the SAT. Mississippi was ranked 18th nationally in SAT scores.

== Reform ==
=== The Mississippi Education Reform Act of 1982 ===
The Mississippi Education Reform Act of 1982 was adopted in an effort to "improve state school governance, leadership and finance, improve professional preparation and growth of school personnel, improve school performance, and encourage higher student achievement."

According to the Mississippi Department of Education's progress report in 2002, major strides had been made in the education system in Mississippi. Leadership was strengthened by appointing the State Superintendent and members of the Mississippi Board of Education in order to eliminate political leadership in the education system. With the creation of a new licensure process, many certified, professional teachers were hired in Mississippi schools. Uniform curriculum had improved school performance, and students had scored increasingly higher on standardized exams.

=== Mississippi Adequate Education Program ===
The Mississippi Adequate Education Program (MAEP) was passed by the Mississippi Legislature in 1997, and its aim was to increase student achievement and eliminate inequity among school districts. The law provides a formula that distributes the necessary educational resources to Mississippi school districts equally.

MAEP has issued over $507 million in State Aid Capital Improvement Bonds and more than 9,000 new, reconditioned school buildings.

=== No Child Left Behind ===
The No Child Left Behind Act was signed into law by President George W. Bush on January 8, 2002, and it requires states to develop assessments in basic skills to be given to all students in certain grades. These states will receive federal funding in turn if these standards are met.

Mississippi adopted "No Child Left Behind" in 2003, and yearly Report Cards are given to the state, districts, and schools to assess their schools.
