= Education in Alabama =

Education in Alabama consists of public and private schools in Alabama, including the University of Alabama, private colleges, and secondary and primary schools.

== History ==
Private and locally established common schools existed in the old Mississippi Territory in what is now Alabama.

The 1819 State Constitution declared:

Schools and the means of education shall forever be encouraged in this State; and the General Assembly shall take measures to preserve, from unnecessary waste or damage, such lands as are or hereafter may be granted by the United States for the use of schools within each township in this State, and apply the funds, which may be raised from such lands; in strict conformity to the object of such grant. The General Assembly shall take like measures for the improvement of such lands as have been or may be hereafter granted by the United States to this State, for the support of a Seminary of learning, and the moneys which may be raised from such lands, by rent, lease, or sale, or from any other quarter, for the purpose, aforesaid, shall be and remain a fund for the exclusive support of a State University, for the promotion of the arts, literature, and the sciences: and it shall be the duty of the General Assembly, as early as may be, to provide effectual means for the improvement and permanent security of the funds and endowments of such institution.

In 1822, Athens State University was established as a private institution called the Athens Female Academy. It did not become a public school until 1974. LaGrange College was established as a private college in 1830. It was destroyed during the war and reestablished in 1872. It is now the University of North Alabama.

In 1850, there were 1,323 schools with about thirty-seven thousand students enrolled.

The state's voters approved a referendum calling for free public schools for white children in 1852. The legislature approved funding for such schools in the 1854 Public Schools Act. This decision was not without controversy. The 1858 Report of the Superintendent of Education, Gabriel B. Du Val discussed the population's attitude toward education, "Fortunately however for Alabama, and it is believed the Southern States generally, this indifference has not been felt toward education itself but toward governmental aid in procuring it. The happy condition of our social relations and general diffusion of wealth has rendered it comparatively unnecessary, wherever it was needed private generosity generally anticipated public aid."

By 1860, about a quarter of white school-aged children were enrolled. The 1868 constitution required free, racially integrated public school funded by the state. During this period, it was a crime in Alabama to teach a slave to read. Slavery was abolished in 1865.

From the end of the Reconstruction era in the 1870s down to the 1940s, the state and local governments gave far less money to all-black public schools compared to the favored white public schools. (There were no racially integrated schools). However many private schools for Blacks were funded by Northern philanthropy well into the 20th century. Support came from the American Missionary Association; the Peabody Education Fund; the Jeanes Fund (also known as the Negro Rural School Fund); the Slater Fund; the Rosenwald Fund; the Southern Education Foundation; and the General Education Board, which was massively funded by the Rockefeller family.

In 1880, a quarter of all whites over the age of ten were illiterate. The number was 18.84% in 1890 and 14.8% in 1900. Only two states, South Carolina and Louisiana had higher figures of illiteracy. Comparable national illiteracy rates are 1880 17%, 1890 13% and 1900 11%. In 2012, the state reported 14.8% of all adults were illiterate. Recent reports use different standards of illiteracy than earlier compilations, and so the numbers are not completely comparable.

In the 1890s, about 25% of white and 38% of black students who entered the first grade left in their first month, unable to pay tuition.

The state's 1901 constitution prohibited both racially integrated schools and state aid to religious schools. It reduced property taxes but required schools to be funded by the localities using tuition and user fees.

Eighty days of schooling per year was made mandatory in 1915, but the requirement could be waived for the very poor. The state began to require each county to have a high school, and by 1918 all but ten counties met the obligation. By the mid-1930s, two-thirds of the children of landowners reached high school, but only a third of the children of white sharecroppers. In an effort to reduce illiteracy the state created "Opportunity Schools" in 1920. These schools enrolled young adults who had not completed fourth grade. The schools taught basic reading and writing to the fourth-grade level.

As a reaction to Brown v. Board of Education in 1954, both state and local officials took steps to preserve de facto educational segregation. In 1955, the state allowed public schools to use intelligence and other tests to assign students. Such tests were a method to keep schools segregated. The state also allowed public funds to flow to private schools that admitted only students of one race. In 1956, Autherine Lucy, the first black student admitted to the University of Alabama, was expelled. In 1958, John Patterson was elected governor on a platform that promised "if a school is ordered to be integrated, it will be closed down". As late as 1965, schools in Jefferson County were still completely segregated.

Since 2000, eleven school districts have been established by breaking away from the county schools. This has eroded the tax base for the county schools and increased racial segregation.

In January 2026, Governor Kay Ivey signed an executive order confirming that Alabama would participate in the Federal Education Freedom Tax Credit Program, which confers tax benefits for donations to approved programs that fund scholarships for elementary and secondary school students.

== Primary and secondary education ==
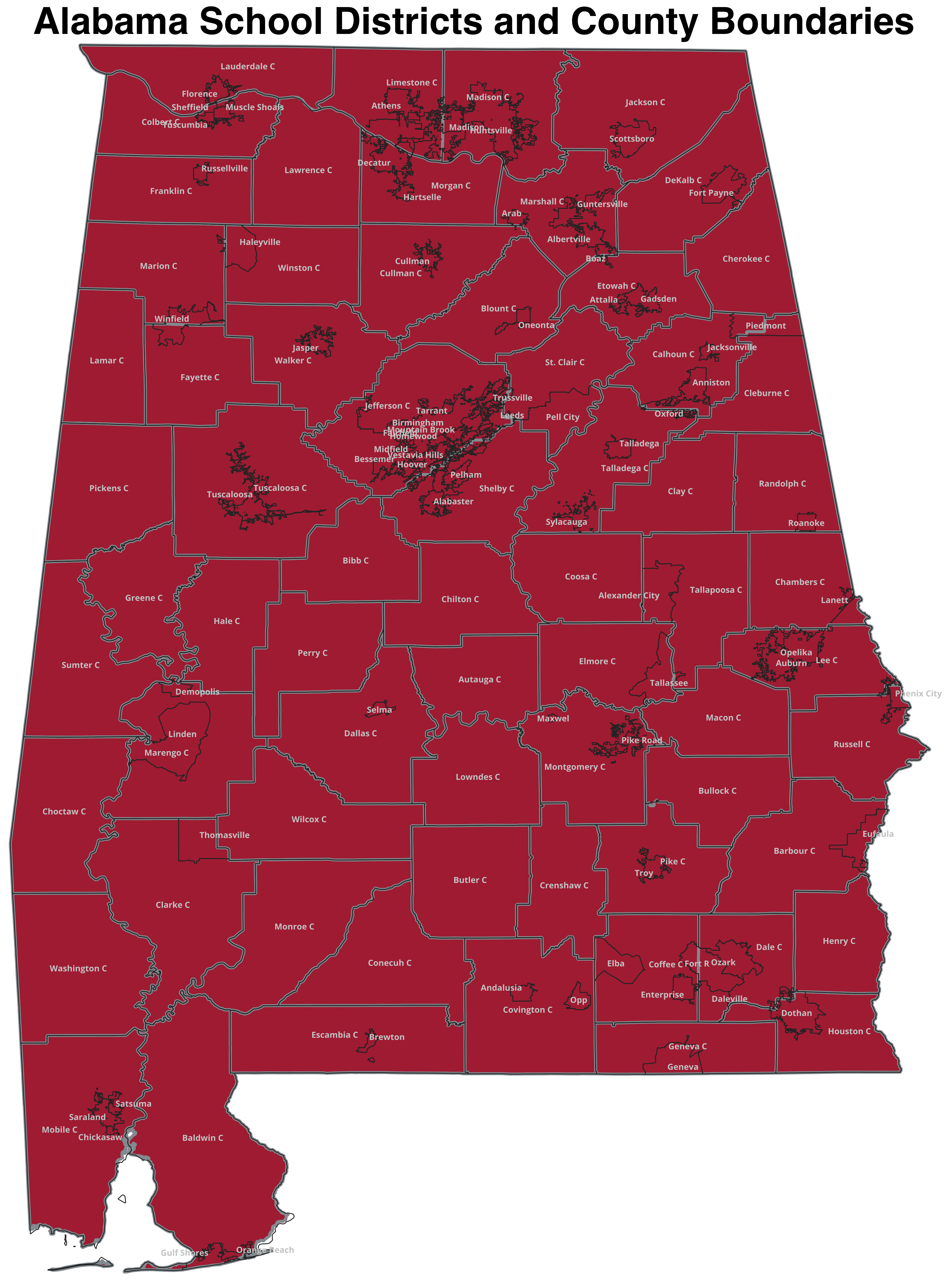
Alabama School Districts

Public primary and secondary education in Alabama is under the overview of the Alabama State Board of Education as well as local oversight by 67 county school boards and 60 city boards of education. Together, 1,541 individual schools provide education for 743,364 elementary and secondary students.

Public school funding is appropriated through the Alabama Legislature through the Education Trust Fund. In FY 2006–2007, Alabama appropriated $3,775,163,578 for primary and secondary education. That represented an increase of $444,736,387 over the previous fiscal year. In 2007, over 82 percent of schools made adequate yearly progress (AYP) toward student proficiency under the National No Child Left Behind law, using measures determined by the state of Alabama. In 2004, 23 percent of schools met AYP.

While Alabama's public education system has improved, it lags behind in achievement compared to other states. According to U.S. Census data from 2000, Alabama's high school graduation rate – 75% – is the second lowest in the United States, after Mississippi. The largest educational gains were among people with some college education but without degrees. This value dropped to 72% for the 2010–2011 school year, but at least 8 states had a lower figure than Alabama that year.

There have been concerns about literacy. 130 high schools out of 367 in the state either failed reading or were classified as "borderline" for 11th graders for the school year 2008–2009. 60% of Alabama's school systems had at least one school that failed reading or was borderline.

The state provides education from Kindergarten through grade 12. It has also established a pre-kindergarten program. This program was recognized in 2007, 2008, 2009 and 2010 as having the highest quality standards, tied for first place with North Carolina. In addition to state funded pre-k programs administered through the state, some public schools in the state offer pre-k through the use of local and federal funds. The appropriation for the state funded pre-k program is $18,376,806. Currently, 7% of the state's four year olds participate in the First Class program.

Although unusual in the West, school corporal punishment is not uncommon in Alabama, with 27,260 public school students paddled at least one time, according to government data for the 2011–2012 school year. The rate of school corporal punishment in Alabama is surpassed only by Mississippi and Arkansas.

== Colleges and universities ==
Alabama's programs of higher education include fourteen four-year public universities, numerous two-year community colleges, and 17 private, undergraduate and graduate universities. Public, post-secondary education in Alabama is overseen by the Alabama Commission on Higher Education. Colleges and universities in Alabama offer degree programs from two-year associate degrees to 16 doctoral level programs.

Accreditation of academic programs is through the Southern Association of Schools and Colleges as well as a plethora of subject focused national and international accreditation agencies.

== Charter schools ==
Alabama has only two charter schools: University Charter School in Livingston, and Legacy Prep in Birmingham.

== See also ==
List of school districts in Alabama

- History of education in the Southern United States
- "A+ Education Partnership" online
- "Alabama Education Association" online
- "Alabama’s School Equalization Program" online
- "Alabama State Teachers Association" online
- "Basil Manly" online
- "Historically Black Colleges and Universities in Alabama" online
  - "Alabama A&M University" online
  - "Selma University" online
  - "Tuskegee University" online
- "Julia S. Tutwiler" online
- "Knight v. State of Alabama" online
- "Public Education in Colonial and Territorial Alabama" online
- "Public Education in Antebellum Alabama" online
- "Public Education During the Civil War and Reconstruction Era" online
- "Public Education in the Early Twentieth Century" online
- "Public Education in Alabama After Desegregation" online
- "University of Alabama" online
