= Leandro v. North Carolina =

Legal case on education funding

Leandro v. North Carolina is a significant legal case related to educational equity in the U.S. state of North Carolina. In the 32 years since the case was filed in 1994 to when it was dismissed with prejudice in 2026, courts concluded that all students in the state are entitled to a "sound basic education" and that the state had not fulfilled that obligation; however, the courts did not have the authority to compel the legislature to fund the proposed remedy.

== Legal proceedings ==
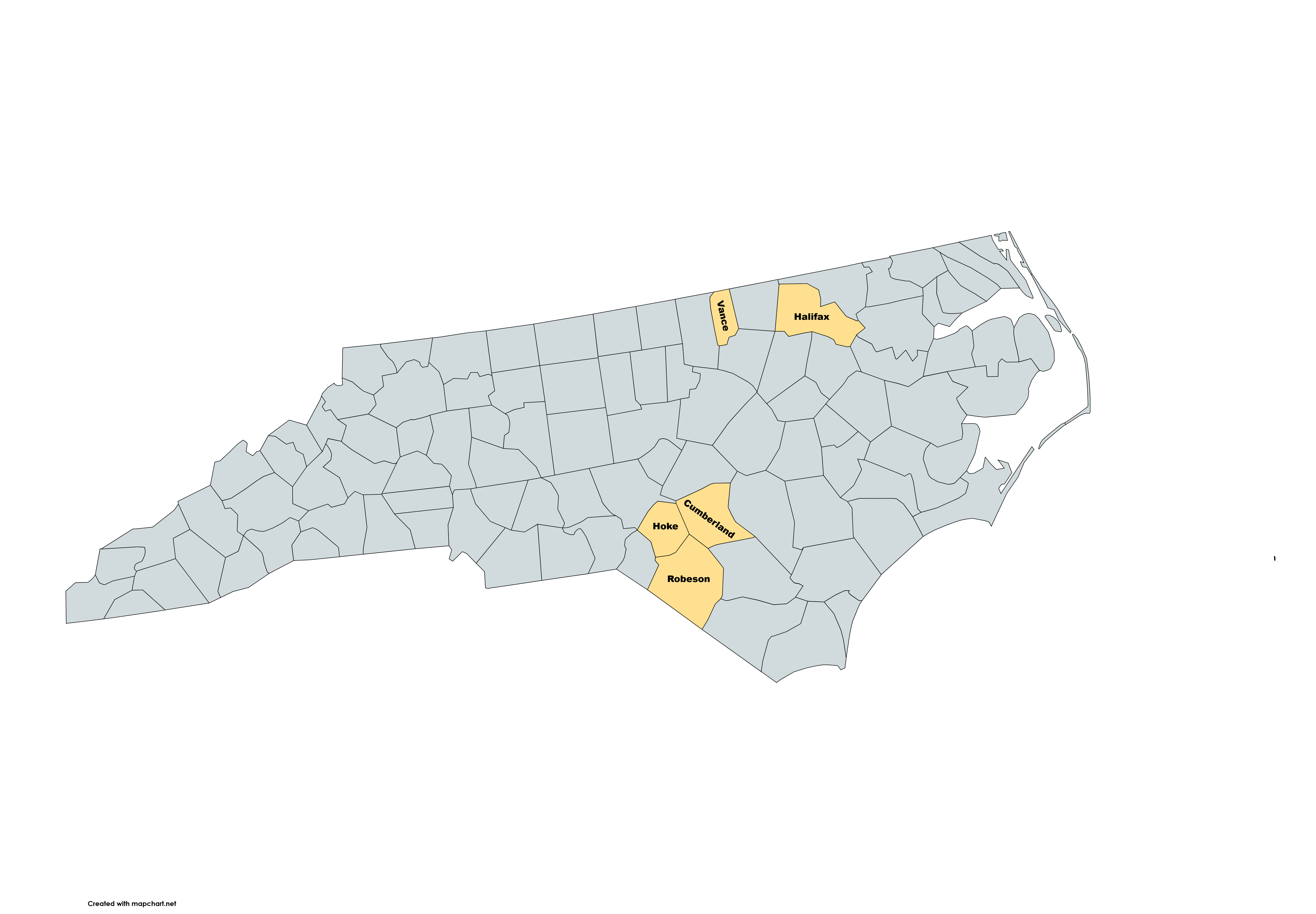
Plaintiff counties in Leandro v. North Carolina, from upper left: Vance, Halifax, Cumberland, Hoke, Robeson

The case was filed in 1994 by the school boards of five North Carolina counties (Cumberland, Halifax, Hoke, Robeson, and Vance) and some resident families, including Kathleen M. Leandro individually and as guardian ad litem of Robert A. Leandro. The case was originally brought in Halifax County, in Eastern North Carolina, but defendants soon had the case transferred to Wake County, site of the state capital, Raleigh.

In 1997, the North Carolina Supreme Court determined that the state constitution guarantees "every child of this state an opportunity to receive a sound basic education in our public schools."

A 2004 decision held that the Leandro ruling also applied to children younger than kindergarten age, prompting the creation of the More At Four pre-K program.

In 2002, Wake County Superior Court Judge Howard Manning found that the state was not meeting its obligations under the Leandro decision. Manning continued this oversight role until his retirement in 2016, focusing mostly on classroom issues such as qualified teachers and principals rather than on funding. Manning's successor, Judge David Lee, mandated in June 2021 that the state implement a Comprehensive Remedial Plan.

In 2022, the case returned to the North Carolina Supreme Court to address whether courts had found a statewide violation of students' rights and whether the courts could compel the transfer of $785 million from the state's budget to remedy that violation. In November, 2022, the court found that there had been such a violation and that the court had the authority to mandate transfer of the funds.

On April 2, 2026, the North Carolina Supreme Court dismissed the Leandro case with prejudice, holding that the court could not compel the transfer of funds.

== Analysis ==
The 1997 Leandro decision was criticized for taking a qualitative approach rather than directly addressing the issue of unequal funding. The decision was also criticized for taking an adequacy approach rather than an equity approach or a more direct remedy, arguing that adequacy approach was likely to make the finding in favor of the plaintiffs largely symbolic.
