= Education in Arkansas =

Education in Arkansas covers the history and current status of education at all levels, public and private, and related policies.

== Current status ==
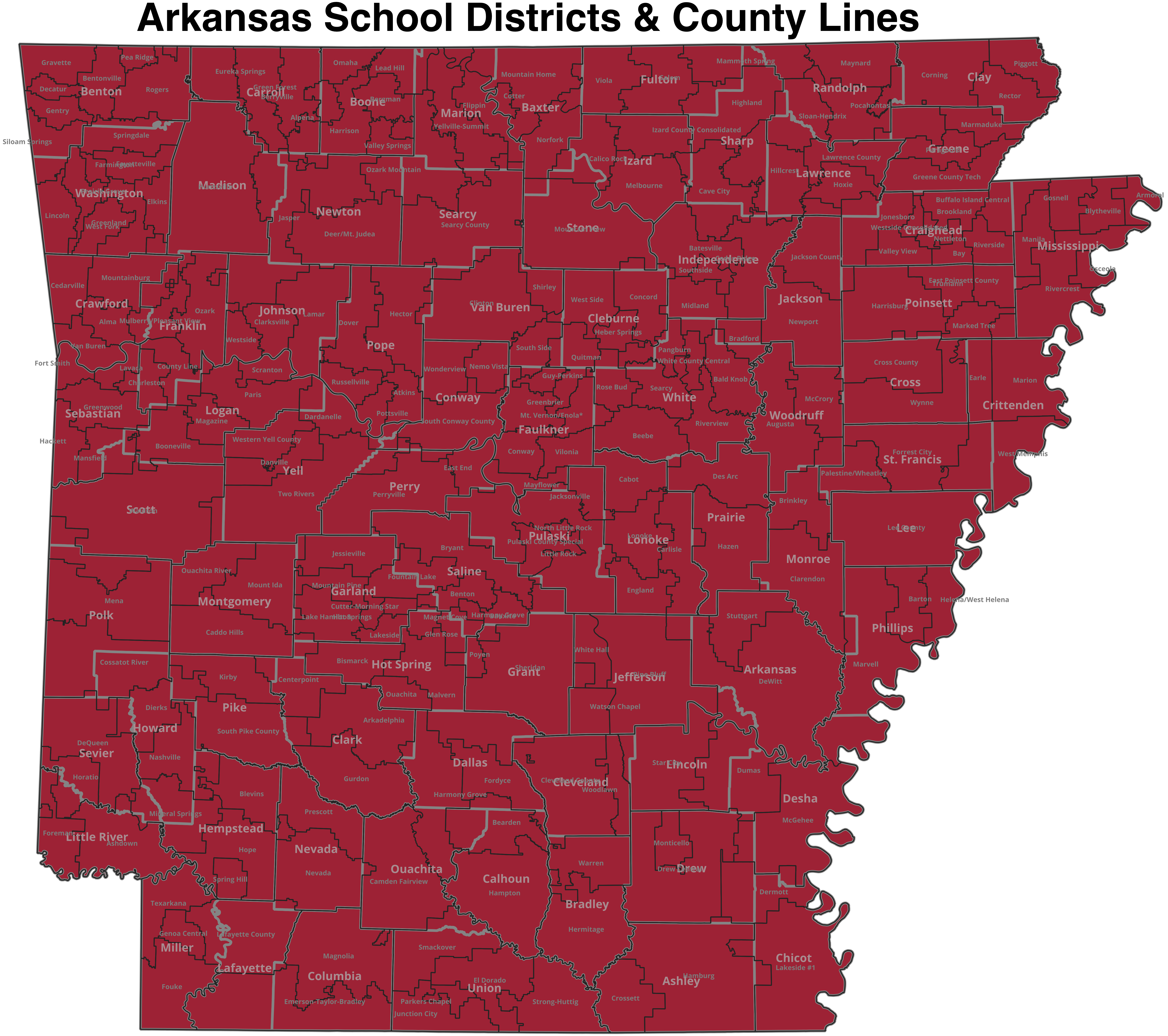
Arkansas School Districts

Arkansas has 1,064 state-funded kindergartens, elementary, junior and senior high schools.

In 2026, Arkansas and Wyoming were tied as the 2 states with the least number of residents possessing student loan median repayment bills of all the 50 states in the United States.

The state supports a network of public universities and colleges, including two major university systems: Arkansas State University System and University of Arkansas System. The University of Arkansas, flagship campus of the University of Arkansas System in Fayetteville was ranked #63 among public schools in the nation by U.S. News & World Report. Other public institutions include University of Arkansas at Little Rock, University of Arkansas at Pine Bluff, Arkansas Tech University, Henderson State University, Southern Arkansas University, and University of Central Arkansas across the state. It is also home to 11 private colleges and universities including Hendrix College, one of the nation's top 100 liberal arts colleges, according to U.S. News & World Report.

== History ==
Slavery was abolished in 1865, and for the first time schooling was made possible for black people. From the end of the Reconstruction era in the 1870s down to the 1940s, the state and local governments gave far less money to all-black public schools compared to the favored white public schools. However many private schools for black people were funded by Northern philanthropy well into the 20th century. Support came from the American Missionary Association; the Peabody Education Fund; the Jeanes Fund (also known as the Negro Rural School Fund); the Slater Fund; the Rosenwald Fund; the Southern Education Foundation; and the General Education Board, which was massively funded by the Rockefeller family.

In the 1920s the state required all children to attend public schools. The school year was set at 131 days, although some areas were unable to meet that requirement.

The most famous episode came in 1957–1958, when "Little Rock Nine" Black students were sent by the school board to integrate Little Rock Central High School. Their enrollment was followed by the "Little Rock Crisis" in which the students were initially prevented from entering the racially segregated school by Orval Faubus, the Governor of Arkansas. They then attended after the intervention of President Dwight D. Eisenhower who sent in the Army. In 1958 Faubus closed the school.

=== Educational attainment ===
Arkansas is one of the least educated U.S. states. It ranks near the bottom in terms of percentage of the population with a high school or college degree. The state's educational system has a history of underfunding, low teachers' salaries and political meddling in the curriculum. However, recent focuses on phonics education have led to an improvement in educational rankings over the past fifteen years.

Educational statistics during the early days are fragmentary and unreliable. Many counties did not submit full reports to the secretary of state, who did double duty as commissioner of common schools. But the percentage of whites over 20 years old who were illiterate was given as:

1840, 21%
1850, 25%
1860, 17%

In 2010 Arkansas students earned an average score of 20.3 on the ACT exam, just below the national average of 21. These results were expected due to the large increase in the number of students taking the exam since the establishment of the Academic Challenge Scholarship. Top high schools receiving recognition from the U.S. News & World Report are spread across the state, including Haas Hall Academy in Fayetteville, KIPP Delta Collegiate in Helena-West Helena, Bentonville, Rogers, Rogers Heritage, Valley Springs, Searcy, and McCrory. A total of 81 Arkansas high schools were ranked by the U.S. News & World Report in 2012.

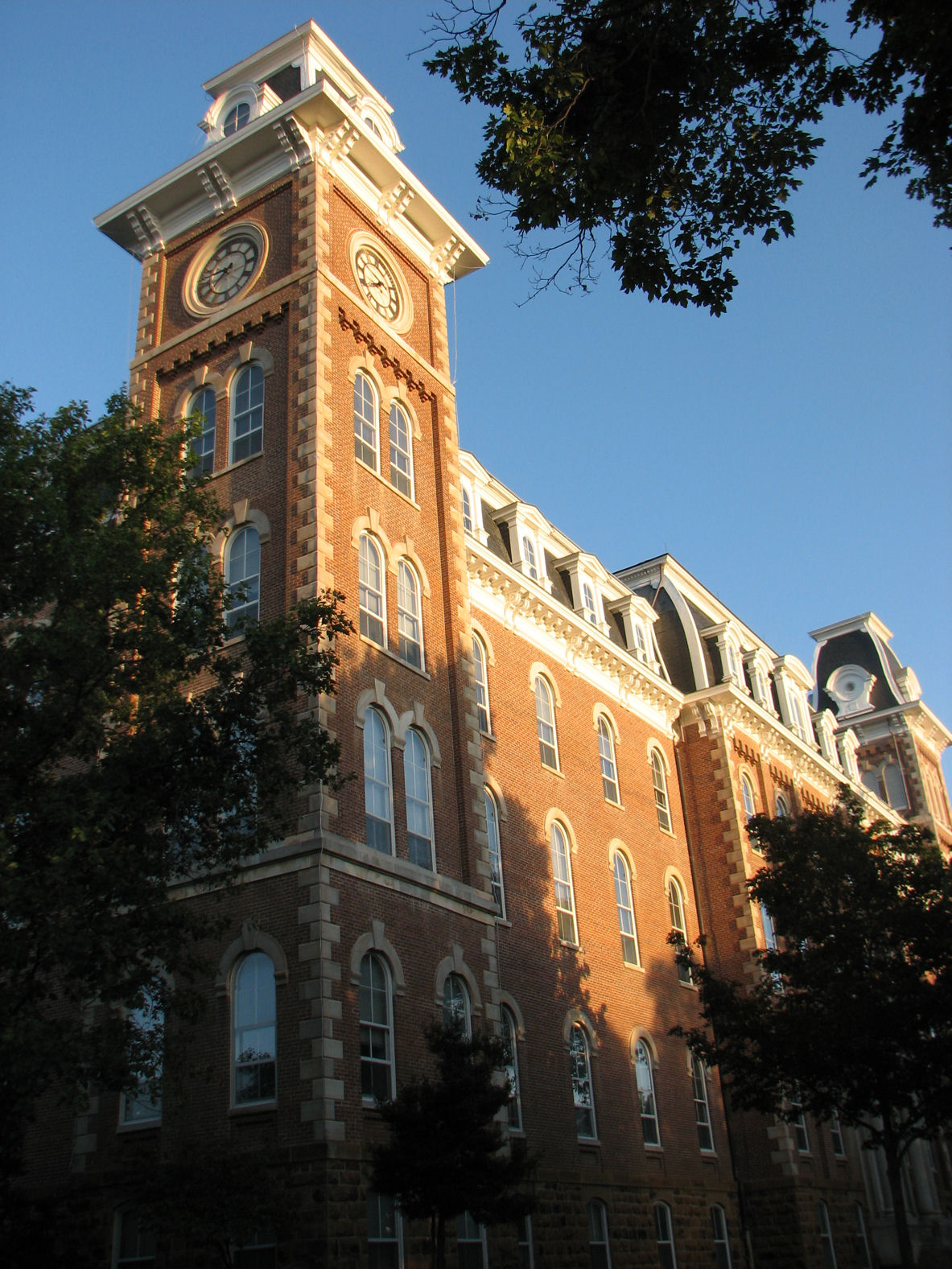
Old Main, part of the Campus Historic District at the University of Arkansas in Fayetteville

Arkansas ranks as the 32nd smartest state on the Morgan Quitno Smartest State Award, 44th in percentage of residents with at least a high school diploma, and 48th in percentage of bachelor's degree attainment. Arkansas has been making strides in education reform. Education Week has praised the state, ranking Arkansas in the top 10 of their Quality Counts Education Rankings every year since 2009 while scoring it in the top 5 during 2012 and 2013. Arkansas specifically received an A in Transition and Policy Making for progress in this area consisting of early-childhood education, college readiness, and career readiness. Governor Mike Beebe has made improving education a major issue through his attempts to spend more on education. Through reforms, the state is a leader in requiring curricula designed to prepare students for postsecondary education, rewarding teachers for student achievement, and providing incentives for principals who work in lower-tier schools.

Generally prohibited in the Western world at large, school corporal punishment is not unusual in recent Arkansas experience, with 20,083 public school students (Note: This figure refers to only the number of students paddled, regardless of whether a student was spanked multiple times in a year, and does not refer to the number of instances of corporal punishment, which would be substantially higher.) paddled at least one time, according to government data for the 2011–12 school year. The rate of corporal punishment in public schools is higher only in Mississippi.

=== Funding ===
As an organized territory, and later in the early days of statehood, education was funded by the sales of federally controlled public lands. This system was inadequate and prone to local graft. In an 1854 message to the legislature, Governor Elias N. Conway said, "We have a common-school law intended as a system to establish common schools in all part of the state; but for the want of adequate means there are very few in operation under this law." At the time, only about a quarter of children were enrolled in school. By the beginning of the American Civil War, the state had only twenty-five publicly funded common schools.

In 1864 the chairman of the committee on education of the state legislature stated that the state government has:

mismanaged and squandered to a great extent the appropriations or donations made by the United States [federal government] to this State for school purposes. We have had over 1,000 acres of land appropriated in this state to purposes of education, but under the management of our public functionaries it has amounted to almost nothing.

In 1867, the state legislature was still controlled by ex-Confederates. It passed a Common Schools Law that allowed public funded but limited schools to white children.

The 1868 legislature banned former Confederates and passed a more wide-ranging law detailing funding and administrative issues and allowing black children to attend school. In furtherance of this, the postwar 1868 state constitution was the first to permit a personal-property tax to fund the lands and buildings for public schools. With the 1868 elections, the first county school commissioners took office.

In 2014, the state spent $9,616 per student, compared with a national average of about $11,000 putting Arkansas in nineteenth place.

=== Higher education ===
According to ERIC (1970), the story begins in 1871 with the founding of Arkansas Industrial University, a land-grant school renamed as the University of Arkansas. The Branch Normal College for Blacks began in 1873; it became Arkansas Agricultural, Mechanical and Normal College in 1927, and University of Arkansas at Pine Bluff in 1972. From time to time several schools began as agricultural high schools, junior colleges or normal institutes (for training elementary teachers). Most expanded to their present status. The early ones were small and had very small budgets, and little or no state oversight.

=== Timeline ===
- 1829 Territorial legislature permits townships to establish schools
- 1868 State law requires racial segregation of schools
- 1871 University of Arkansas established
- 1873 University of Arkansas at Pine Bluff established as a school to train black teachers
- 1877 Philander Smith College established as a school for black students
- 1890 Henderson State University established (as a private school, becoming Henderson State Teachers College in 1929)
- 1885 Arkansas School for the Deaf and Arkansas School for the Blind established
- 1909 Arkansas Tech University, Southern Arkansas University, University of Arkansas at Monticello and Arkansas State University established as schools offering high school diplomas and vocational training
- 1920s Schooling made compulsory
- 1925 University of Central Arkansas established (as Arkansas State Normal School)
- 1948 University of Arkansas School of Law admits a black student
- 1957 Governor Orval Faubus uses National Guard troops to oppose racial integration of Little Rock Central High School
- 1958 United States Supreme Court overrules the governor
- 1983 Arkansas State Supreme Court rules that the state's funding of education is Constitutionally deficient

== See also ==
- History of education in the Southern United States
- History of Arkansas
- Little Rock Nine, school crisis in 1957–1958
