= Education in Virginia =

Education in Virginia addresses the needs of students from pre-kindergarten through adult education. Virginia's educational system consistently ranks in the top ten states on the U.S. Department of Education's National Assessment of Educational Progress, with Virginia students outperforming the average in almost all subject areas and grade levels tested. The 2010 Quality Counts report ranked Virginia's K–12 education fourth best in the country. All school divisions must adhere to educational standards set forth by the Virginia Department of Education, which maintains an assessment and accreditation regime known as the Standards of Learning to ensure accountability. In 2008, 81% of high school students graduated on-time after four years. The 1984 Virginia Assembly stated that, "Education is the cornerstone upon which Virginia's future rests."

== History ==
The Syms School was founded in 1635, as the first free school in the Americas, but this was not the first attempt at establishing an education system. The first attempt was a move in 1619-1620 by the London Company to begin a school to educate Indian children in Christianity. The second attempt, known as the "East India School", was meant to educate white children in the colony of Virginia. During the colonial period, Virginia was one of the first colonies to establish schools and colleges, such as The College of William and Mary in 1693.

Thomas Jefferson drafted a "Bill for More General Diffusion of Knowledge" to create a universal public education, but most planters at the time did not want tax money to go to educating poor children. Jefferson did start the first public university, The University of Virginia, in 1819. According to Thomas Hunt, Charles F. Mercer authored a report in the state legislature in 1816 calling for state supported primary schooling for all white children. Supervision was to be provided by a state Board of Public Instruction, chosen by the legislature. In 1817, his bill passed the lower house but died in the state senate. Jefferson opposed the plan because heavy funding for primary schools would divert money from his beloved state university, and the plan would replace local control by state control.

Finally the first free public school systems were established around 1851. Unlike Northern and Western states influenced by the ideas of Horace Mann, public education was not required under the Virginia state constitution until 1870, after an innovation in the Virginia Constitutional Convention of 1868 (although paying for such education became controversial in the next decade).

In addition to the free schools, "pay schools" also existed, particularly for education beyond simple literacy. Before the American Civil War, rich families employed private tutors. Other schools were funded at least partially by parents within a community, and they also had control over the school as a community. Some were known as field schools, because communities often built in a field by the community. After the American Civil War, the Peabody Foundation distributed funds to help construct field schools, as later did the Rosenwald Foundation, which established Rosenwald Schools in Virginia and other Southern states to assist in educating African Americans. Church groups also established schools, especially to educate Native Americans and remote mountain communities. Rev. Frederick Never established over a dozen in the Blue Ridge Mountains, of which Blue Ridge School still exists today. Baptist and other missionaries founded others, including the Manassas Industrial School and Rappahannock Industrial Academy. Some schools operated only in the winter months so students could assist their farming families; others closed during the winter months. Privately funded education also included private tutors or boarding schools abroad for richer or luckier families.

Virginia built many schools after World War I and again after World War II, but such barely kept up with population growth. Virginia had among the lowest tax rates in the nation, so local school boards often scrimped on school construction. Before $45 million in appropriations during the administration of Governor John S. Battle, per pupil expenditures and teacher salaries both remained below national averages, and the state ranked last nationally in percentage of high school age children actually attending high school, and next-to-last in college age children going to college.

However, with the collapse of Massive Resistance in the 1960s, Virginia school expenditures increased, as did educational standards.

Now, Virginia has 134 school divisions that are governed by local school boards. Within these divisions, approximately 1,900 schools provide an education for over one million students.

== Prekindergarten ==
Governor Tim Kaine launched an initiative for state-funding of pre-kindergarten education. These programs are focused on children with "at risk" demographics to assist them in performing well at the K-12 levels. During the 2008 General Assembly session, Governor Kaine backed $22 million expansion to increase the accessibility of pre-k education for at-risk four-year-olds.

== K-12 ==
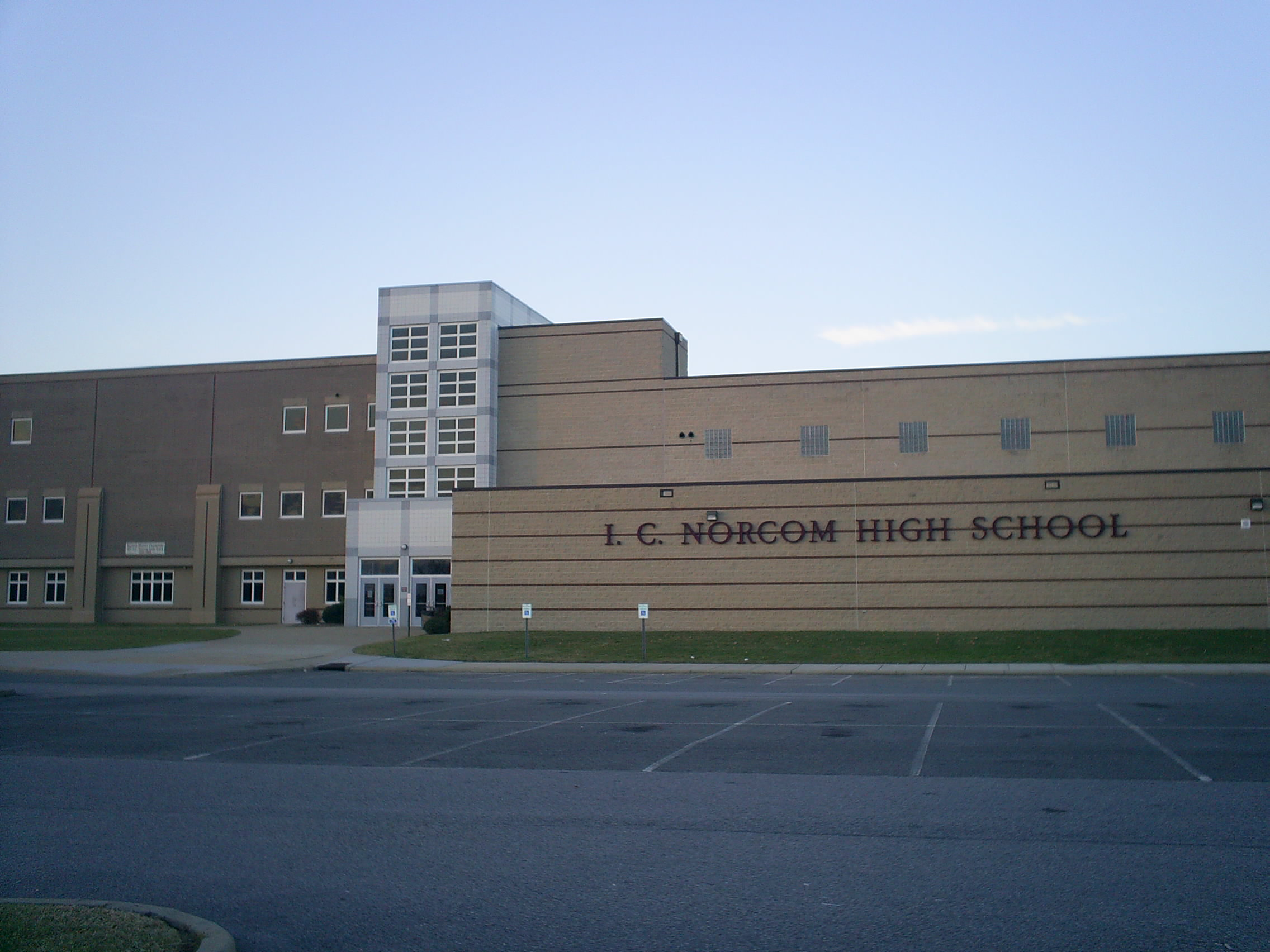
I.C. Norcom High School, a public high school located in Portsmouth, Virginia

Public K–12 schools in Virginia are generally operated by the counties and cities, and not by the state. As of April 2010, a total of 1,259,623 students were enrolled in 1,881 local and regional schools in the Commonwealth, including three charter schools, and an additional 109 alternative and special education centers across 132 school divisions. Between 2000 and 2008, school enrollment increased 5%, the number of teachers 21%.

Besides the general public schools in Virginia, there are Governor's Schools and selective magnet schools. The Governor's Schools are a collection of more than 40 regional high schools and summer programs intended for gifted students. The Virginia Council for Private Education oversees the regulation of 294 state accredited and 141 non-accredited private schools. An additional 23,290 students receive homeschooling.

Nine high schools in the Northern Virginia region are ranked in the top 100 nationwide by Newsweek magazine. In addition, Thomas Jefferson High School for Science and Technology, which requires an application, is listed as the best public high school in the nation according to U.S. News & World Report. All Northern Virginia schools pay the test fees for students to take Advanced Placement and International Baccalaureate exams, and Alexandria and Arlington lead the nation in college course tests.

=== Online Education ===
Virtual Virginia (VVa) is the Department of Education's system for providing online courses to students. These classes are mostly Advanced Placement (AP) classes for students who are home schooled or go to a public high school (some courses are offered to middle school students) where the course is not taught. These courses are offered free of charge to students enrolled through a high school, but not to those in private or home schooling, or those who are out of state. This program got its start in the 1980s, when AP courses were offered through satellite schools to students in Virginia, mostly to those in rural areas without many other education options. The program became known as the Virginia Satellite Education Network (VSEN). That program got combined with Virtual Virginia Advanced Placement School to become what it is today.

VVa currently offers a total of 54 classes; 23 of them are AP and 21 are for foreign languages. These classes are mostly one or two semester courses, with a select few being offered during the summer. The school is run through Desire2Learn, a web-based course management system which presents the lesson material through a web browser.

=== Standards of Learning ===
Virginia has a statewide system of support and accountability for its public schools. These standards hold the state accountable for rigorous academic standards, called the Standards of Learning (SOL). Success is measured through annual SOL testing and also through alternative testing. The standards test students in English, math, science, and social studies. Tests are conducted at the end of 3rd, 5th, 8th grade, and at the end of some high school courses in all subjects, but English and math are tested in grades 3-8, and also at the end of some high school courses. Testing depends on the curriculum, and can occur at any grade level according to what the curriculum says. In 2001, there was parental resistance to the Standards of Learning, or SOLs, saying they were unrealistic goals. By 2004, students were required to take a series of 11 exams that were all based on the SOLs. By 2007, in order for a school to keep its accreditation, they must have a 70% pass rate of the SOLs among their students. They also argued that the tests did not accurately match what was in the curriculum. As stated by the Standards of Learning Objectives, "The Standards of Learning Program Establishes a framework for general education in the public schools in Virginia. It includes objectives to help students acquire the knowledge, skills, and attitudes believed necessary for further education and employment." When the standards were first implemented, some veteran teachers saw them as a loss, while some inexperienced teachers viewed them as a gain to the educational system. Losses might include things like a sense of a loss of power, and gains might be seen as things like a great opportunity for collaboration between teachers. The major goal of having standards for curriculum is to create quality American schools. Diane Ravitch is one of the predominant people to help write the standards, and she says that "standards give clear expectations for students, teachers, parents, colleges, and employers that will result in improved student achievement".

=== No Child Left Behind ===
The No Child Left Behind Act of 2001 was signed into law on January 8, 2002 by President George W. Bush. It is commonly abbreviated as NCLB. It was a re-authorization of the Elementary and Secondary Education Act, and some say that it was one of the most significant pieces of legislation to affect education in the last 30 years. No Child Left Behind was designed to hold schools accountable for students' proficiency, as determined by testing procedures. NCLB states that the 4 major goals are "stronger accountability for results, increased flexibility and local control, expanded options for parents, and an emphasis on teaching options that have been proven to work.". The goal of NCLB was to have all students testing at proficient levels by the 2012-2013 school year. It also says that 95% of all eligible students must be taking the SOL tests. "Adequate Yearly Progress" (AYP), which is meeting the target proficiency ratings, must be met by the schools annually. If two consecutive years pass where a school does not meet AYP, then they get labeled as "needing improvement", and supplemental services may be offered. No Child Left Behind also regulates employment of teachers, by requiring that all teachers are "highly qualified". Although the overall goal of No Child Left Behind is full of good intentions, it does not meet all students' needs, for example, high-achieving, "gifted" students. NCLB also has implications for teachers, by putting a lot of pressure on the educators in the public school system to get the required proficiency results. Some have also argued that NCLB legislation prevents the teaching of civics, because the curriculum is so focused on other content areas. This could be detrimental, because the foundation of the public education system was to help students develop into productive citizens. NCLB was repealed in 2015, succeeded by the Every Student Succeeds Act.

== Higher education ==
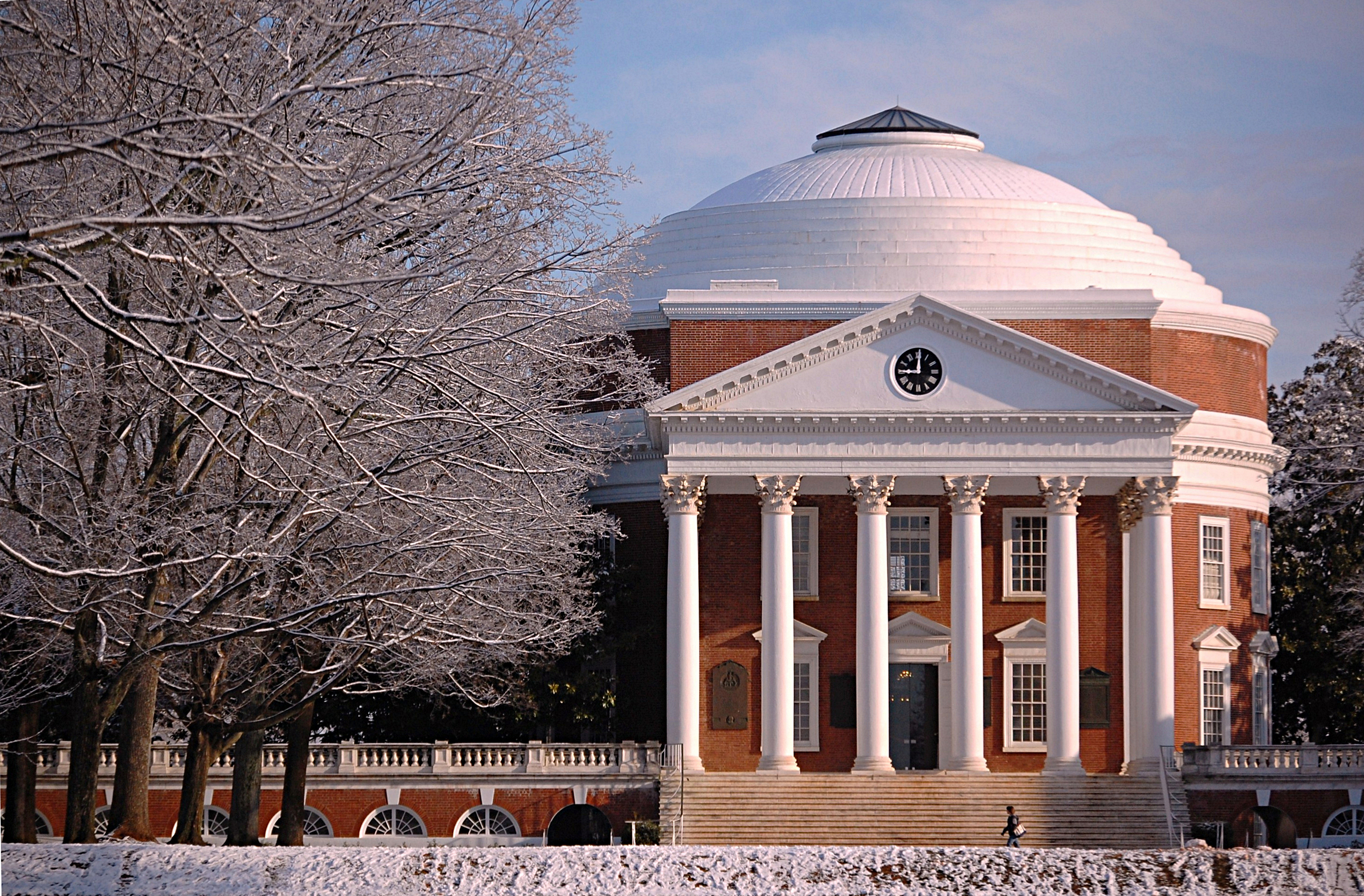
The University of Virginia, a World Heritage Site, was founded by President Thomas Jefferson.

As of 2010, there are 167 colleges and universities in Virginia. In the 2022-2023 U.S. News & World Report ranking of public colleges in the United States, multiple institutions in Virginia were ranked: the University of Virginia was 3rd, the College of William & Mary was 13th, Virginia Tech was 23rd, George Mason University was 64th, James Madison University was 72nd, Virginia Commonwealth University was 83rd, and Old Dominion University was 156th. In U.S. News & World Report 2008 America's Best Colleges report, James Madison University was recognized as the number one regional public master's university in The South since 1993. In 2008, Virginia Commonwealth University was ranked the 4th best public university in Fine Arts in the United States according to U.S. News & World Report. The Virginia Military Institute is the oldest state military college and a top ranked public liberal arts college. Liberty University is also the largest university in Virginia with over 92,000 students, followed closely by Virginia Tech and Virginia Commonwealth University. Virginia Tech and Virginia State University are the state's land-grant universities. Virginia also operates 23 community colleges on 40 campuses serving over 288,000 students. There are 120 private institutions, including Washington and Lee University, Emory & Henry College, Hampden–Sydney College, Roanoke College, and the University of Richmond.

Virginia law requires each public college or university to publish the amount of its fees separate from its tuition. As reported in the Washington Post, athletic fees have grown in recent years. Athletic fees typically go to a separate fund to pay for intercollegiate athletic teams. Over the past 10 years, the average athletic fee at 14 public universities has doubled from $530 to $986. All students at an institution must pay the athletic fee, whether or not they participate in sports.

Virginia public university athletic fees
University	Tuition and fees	Athletic fees	% of total
George Mason University	$8,584	$476	5%
Old Dominion University	$7,708	$1,133	15%
University of Virginia	$10,628	$657	6%
Virginia Commonwealth University	$8,817	$559	6%
Virginia Tech	$9,589	$257	3%
College of William and Mary	$12,188	$1,422	12%
Christopher Newport University	$9,250	$1,147	12%
James Madison University	$7,860	$1,114	14%
Longwood University	$9,855	$2,022	21%
University of Mary Washington	$7,862	$350	4%
Norfolk State University	$6,227	$1,441	23%
Radford University	$7,694	$1,077	14%
Virginia Military Institute	$12,328	$1,362	11%
Virginia State University	$6,570	$791	12%

== Federal role ==
Virginia's two land grant universities, Virginia Tech and Virginia State University, receive federal funding to perform agricultural research and to conduct cooperative extension services.

Virginia opted to not participate in No Child Left Behind federal funding. Virginia filed an application for the first round of federal Race to the Top funding, but finished 31st out of 41 states in the first round, and did not receive funds. On May 26, 2010, Virginia Governor Bob McDonnell withdrew the state from the second round of Race to the Top funding. McDonnell did not believe that Virginia should apply for the second round because he erroneously believed the competition required the use of common education performance standards instead of Virginia's current standards. In fact, the use of common performance standards is not required. Although McDonnell supported the Race to the Top program during his campaign for governor, McDonnell later went on to claim that the Race to the Top rules precluded participating states from adopting more rigorous standards in addition to whatever multi-state standards they join. However, the "Race to the Top" regulations award the points even if states adopt standards more rigorous than the optional, common standards.
