= Education in Tennessee =

Education in Tennessee covers public and private schools and related organizations from the 18th century to the present.

State government operations are administered by the Tennessee Department of Education. The state Board of Education has 11 members: one from each Congressional district, a student member, and the executive director of the Tennessee Higher Education Commission (THEC), who serves as ex-officio nonvoting member.

== History ==
=== Black schools in 1860s ===
Protestant evangelical activists from the New England diaspora created a number of organizations to educate the ex-slaves. The Western Freedmen's Aid Commission in Cincinnati formed in January 1863. Its goal was to set up schools for freed slaves in Union-controlled districts in the western states. It worked closely with the federal government's Freedmen's Bureau, whose Educational Division played a crucial role. By 1865, 123 white teachers provided manual and domestic training as well as academic instruction. There were 1,949 students in Memphis and over 300 in Clarksville. In 1866 the Freedman Bureau official covering Kentucky and Tennessee reported 75 schools with 264 teachers and 14,800 pupils, not counting independent. schools. in Nashville, Memphis and Knoxville. The Freedman's Bureau provided the school buildings and the Commission provided the teachers, typically young women from the New England diaspora, along with some Northern Blacks. While the Union Army had conquered enemy forces, these teachers believed they had a more important mission: to enlighten and change the Southern mindset. Another goal was to establish political equality for Black people. The schools had an all-Black student body, but a significant number of these Northern educators believed that integrating schools was the only way to achieve these conditions. Reverend D. Burt, the Bureau’s superintendent of education, was a prominent advocate for this cause. Freedman Bureau and religious funds help establish leadership schools at the high school level to train Black teachers. Over the years they added college level programs. Fisk University was the most famous; others included Central Tennessee College at Nashville, Nashville Normal and Theological Institute, and LeMoyne Normal Institute in Memphis.

== Public and private schools ==
Public primary and secondary education systems are operated by county, city, or special school districts to provide education at the local level, and operate under the direction of the Tennessee Department of Education. The state also has many private schools.

The state enrolls approximately 1 million K–12 students in 137 districts. In 2021, the four-year high school graduation rate was 88.7%, a decrease of 1.2% from the previous year. According to the most recent data, Tennessee spends $9,544 per student, the 8th lowest in the nation.

== Higher education ==
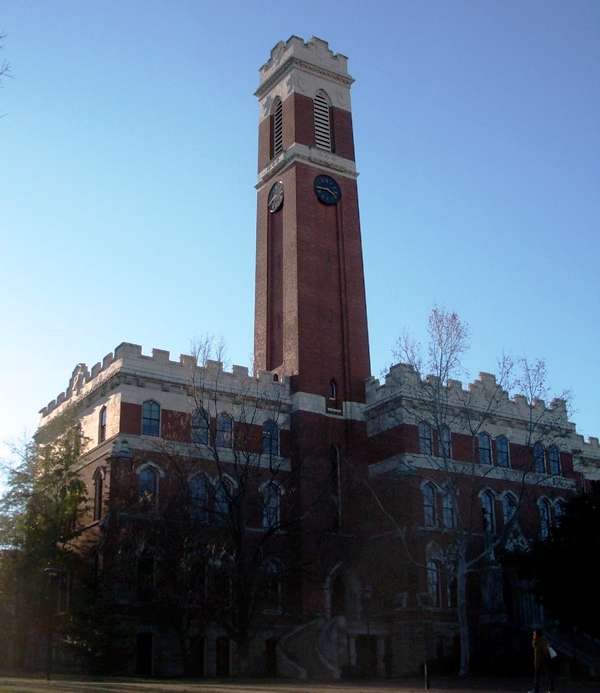
Vanderbilt University in Nashville is consistently ranked as one of the top research institutions in the nation

Public higher education is overseen by the Tennessee Higher Education Commission (THEC), which provides guidance to the state's two public university systems. The University of Tennessee system operates four primary campuses in Knoxville, Chattanooga, Martin, and Pulaski; a Health Sciences Center in Memphis; and an aerospace research facility in Tullahoma. The Tennessee Board of Regents (TBR), also known as The College System of Tennessee, operates 13 community colleges and 27 campuses of the Tennessee Colleges of Applied Technology (TCAT). Until 2017, the TBR also operated six public universities in the state; it now only gives them administrative support.

In January 1952, the University of Tennessee was the first major southern university to admit blacks.

In 2014, the Tennessee General Assembly created the Tennessee Promise, which allows in-state high school graduates to enroll in two-year post-secondary education programs such as associate degrees and certificates at community colleges and trade schools in Tennessee tuition-free, funded by the state lottery, if they meet certain requirements. The Tennessee Promise was created as part of then-governor Bill Haslam's "Drive to 55" program, which set a goal of increasing the number of college-educated residents to at least 55% of the state's population. The program has also received national attention, with multiple states having since created similar programs modeled on the Tennessee Promise.

Tennessee has 107 private institutions. Vanderbilt University in Nashville is consistently ranked as one of the nation's leading research institutions. Nashville is often called the "Athens of the South" due to its many colleges and universities. Tennessee is also home to six historically Black colleges and universities (HBCUs).

== See also ==
- List of school districts in Tennessee
- List of high schools in Tennessee
- History of education in the Southern United States
