= Education in Mississippi =

Formal education in Mississippi began in the early 19th century with private schools and academies, a public education system was founded during the Reconstruction era, by the biracial legislature led by the Republican Party. Throughout its history, Mississippi has produced notable education inequalities due to racial segregation and underfunding of black schools, as well as rural zoning and lack of commitment to funding education.

At the start of the 21st century, Mississippi struggled to meet national assessment standards, and the state had low graduation rates. The Mississippi Legislature and Board of Education developed policies aimed at building better learning environments and standards in the classroom. Since 2013, Mississippi has improved reading scores across racial demographics and now frequently ranks in the top half nationwide, in a turn dubbed the Mississippi Miracle. In 2005, ninety-one percent of white students statewide were in public schools, and an even higher percentage of black students.

Although unusual in the West, school corporal punishment is common in Mississippi, with 31,236 public school students paddled at least one time. A greater percentage of students were paddled in Mississippi than in any other state, according to government data for the 2011–2012 school year.

== Antebellum education ==
Prior to the American Civil War, the elite arranged for private education of their children, founding private academies and schools. Some sent their children to the North (particularly Philadelphia, which had many Southerners) or England for education. The state government did not set a curriculum. Most children were educated at home for the skills they needed to help support their families.

Funding for the few schools was left to private donations and student tuition. In Columbus, Franklin Academy for Boys was opened in 1821 as the first public school in Mississippi for white students. By 1830, only thirteen percent of white children were enrolled in public schools, and there was limited access to government-funded schools at the beginning of the Reconstruction.

In 1918, Mississippi became the last state in the Union to require children to attend at least some schooling.

== Education in the 1868 Constitution ==
Mississippi's Constitution of 1868, drafted by a biracial convention, was the first legislation to provide for free public education for all children in the state. The constitution established a “uniform system of free public schools, by taxation or otherwise, for all children between the ages of five and twenty-one years.”

Legislation was passed in 1870 that created school districts under the supervision of an elected State Superintendent of Education and appointed county superintendents, as well. Areas of a population with at least 5000 were permitted to establish separate school districts and extend the school term to seven months.

The Constitution provided the following features in its legislation to establish a public education system: 1. Administration: the state superintendent of public education must be elected to provide “general supervision of the commons schools and the educations interests of the State.” A State Board of Education shall also be made up of the State Superintendent, the Attorney General and the Secretary of State. 2. School Term: The school year should also be at least four months. Any county that does not abide by the guidelines presented in the legislation should forgo its share of school funding and taxes. 3. Funding: The common schools were funded from a combination of revenue earned from the sixteenth sections lands, and an excise tax on alcohol, military exemption fees, and public and private donations specifically designed for public education. Such monies were invested in United States bonds, and the interest collected was allotted to support school systems. A poll tax was also levied to aid in funding education.

By this time, the state was dominated by Protestant European Americans. The Constitution also states that public schools or their funds were not to be controlled by any religious group. It forbade the conversion of public schools into Catholic parochial schools.

== African Americans and education ==
Before the American Civil War, both enslaved and free African Americans were prohibited by state law from receiving education. After the war, missionary groups in northern Mississippi helped establish schools to educate African-American youth. Some white supremacists tried to take control of the educational system, hoping to quell efforts to educate African Americans.

The Constitution of 1868 did not direct integration of the new public school system, in part to gain support to establish it at all. The legislature determined that each individual school district could choose whether to have an integrated or segregated system. Superintendents of each county were told to divide the funds equally between white and black schools in the district, but black schools were underfunded.

White schools were better constructed and were able to better serve the students academically. During the 1870s, education for blacks was further endangered as violence erupted in protest of the education of African Americans. At the same time, the government greatly decreased funding for public schools and the effectiveness of schools diminished. In 1886, state Superintendent J. R. Preston created a revised education code that slowly raised standards in the classroom. Teachers were paid more in salaries and were required to take teacher licensing exams.

From the end of the Reconstruction era in the 1870s down to the 1940s, the state and local governments gave far less money to all-black public schools compared to the favored white public schools. (There were no racially integrated schools). However many private schools for Blacks were funded by Northern philanthropy well into the 20th century. Support came from the American Missionary Association; the Peabody Education Fund; the Jeanes Fund (also known as the Negro Rural School Fund); the Slater Fund; the Rosenwald Fund; the Southern Education Foundation; and the General Education Board, which was massively funded by the Rockefeller family.

== Leaders in education ==
The Mississippi Board of Education, which currently has nine members, oversees education policy in the state. The Board-appointed State Superintendent of Education, sets public education policy and oversees the Mississippi Department of Education.

Section 201 of the Mississippi Constitution states that the Mississippi Governor shall appoint one member from Mississippi's Northern Supreme Court district, one member from Mississippi's Central Supreme Court district, one member from Mississippi's Southern Supreme Court district, one member who is employed as a school administrator, and one member who is employed as a public school teacher. Additionally, the Lieutenant Governor shall appoint two members-at-large, and the Speaker of the Mississippi House of Representatives shall appoint two members-at-large.

== Historical Recommendations for Regional Screening Centers in Mississippi ==
In the past, an advisory council in Mississippi recommended the investigation of establishing regional centers for screening children across several locations, including the University of Mississippi in Oxford, Mississippi State College in Starkville, Mississippi State College for Women in Columbus, Delta State Teachers College in Cleveland, and Mississippi Southern College in Hattiesburg, among others. This initiative aimed to address the needs indicated by applications received from various communities. The council emphasized that personnel at each screening center should include representatives from psychological services, medical services, education, and speech correction services. Specifically, it was recommended that when screening African American children, a qualified African American educator, counselor, or social worker be included as part of the screening team to enhance cultural sensitivity. The council outlined specific qualifications for personnel involved in the screening process: a licensed medical doctor, preferably a pediatrician or general practitioner with expertise in exceptional children; a psychologist holding a doctoral degree, qualified through training and experience in individual testing of children; an educator with elementary school experience, particularly knowledgeable about exceptional children; and a speech therapist with training and experience in speech therapy. These recommendations reflect the early efforts in Mississippi to improve educational screening and support services for children with exceptional needs.

== See also ==
- List of high schools in Mississippi
- List of school districts in Mississippi
- Public Education in Mississippi
- Thank God for Mississippi
