= List of Girlfriend, Girlfriend episodes =

Girlfriend, Girlfriend is an anime television series based on the manga of the same name by Hiroyuki. Tezuka Productions animated the series, with Satoshi Kuwabara as director, Keiichirō Ōchi as scriptwriter, and Akiko Toyoda designing the characters. Miki Sakurai, Tatsuhiko Saiki, and Sayaka Aoki composed the series' music. It aired from July 3 to September 18, 2021, on the Animeism programming block on MBS, TBS, and BS-TBS, as well as AT-X. (Note: MBS listed the series premiere at 26:25 on July 2, 2021, which is July 3 at 2:25 a.m.) Necry Talkie performed the series' opening theme song "Fuzaketenai ze" (ふざけてないぜ), while Momo Asakura performed the series' ending theme song "Pinky Hook" (ピンキーフック, Pinkī Fukku). Crunchyroll licensed the series outside of Asia. Muse Communication licensed the series in South and Southeast Asia, and streamed it on its YouTube channel, iQIYI, and Bilibili. On August 9, 2022, Crunchyroll announced the series would receive an English dub, which premiered on the very same day.

On September 16, 2022, it was announced that the anime would be receiving a second season. It is produced by SynergySP, with Takatoshi Suzuki serving as the director, Kazuhiko Inukai serving as scriptwriter along with Ōchi, Shouko Hagiwara serving as the character designer, and Kanade Sakuma and Junko Nakajima composing the music along with Sakurai and Saiki. The second season aired from October 7 to December 23, 2023. (Note: MBS listed the season premiere at 26:23 on October 6, 2023, which is October 7 at 2:23 a.m.) Hikari Kodama performed the opening theme song "Dramatic ni Koi Shitai" (ドラマチックに恋したい), while ClariS performed the ending theme song "Forira" (ふぉりら).

== Series overview ==
Season	Episodes	Originally released	
Season	Episodes	First released	Last released
1	12	July 3, 2021	September 18, 2021
2	12	October 7, 2023	December 23, 2023

== Episodes ==
=== Season 1 (2021) ===
No. overall	No. in season	Title (Note: All English titles are taken from Crunchyroll.)	Directed by	Written by	Storyboarded by	Original release date
1	1	"Even If That Isn't the Right Way"; Transliteration: "Sore ga Tadashii Michi ja Nakutemo" (Japanese: それが正しい道じゃなくても)	Masami Hata	Keiichirō Ōchi	Satoshi Kuwabara	July 3, 2021
Naoya Mukai has recently begun dating his childhood friend Saki Saki. Another girl, Nagisa Minase, confesses she is head-over-heels in love with him, but he turns her down, showing no romantic feelings for her whatsoever. However, she decides not to give up, and although Noaya initially tries to resist her affections by running away, he eventually finds her so cute he returns her feelings and decides to convince Saki to accept Nagisa as his second girlfriend. Saki is so overwhelmed by Nagisa's cuteness she secrely falls in love with her as well, and insists on becoming friends straight away. Naoya manages to explain his desire to date them both, and though Saki punishes him, she is eventually convinced by Naoya's honesty and Nagisa's cuteness and gives permission. Naoya suggests they move in together as he lives alone. On the first night, Saki is impressed by Nagisa's housewife skills, but is slightly jealous of her larger breasts. Nagisa offers to let Saki sleep with Naoya first, but Saki admits their relationship is not sexual yet. This leads to an awkward conversation where Naoya admits he would like a threesome. Saki admits she is tempted because of Nagisa's cuteness, but still insists Naoya is a pervert for suggesting it. Naoya decides to delay having sex until they are all more comfortable with each other, but is surprised when Saki seems disappointed, though she violently denies it.
2	2	"How Nagisa Feels"; Transliteration: "Nagisa no Kimochi" (Japanese: 渚の気持ち)	Atsuji Kaneko	Keiichirō Ōchi	Satoshi Kuwabara	July 10, 2021 (Note: This episode aired at 2:40 a.m. JST, 15 minutes after the original air time.)
For their first night, Naoya suggests everyone sleep in the same room. Nagisa moves into Naoya's futon to talk, causing Saki to think they are having sex. As such, both girls move into Naoya's futon to be close to him. Later that night, Nagisa decides to spy on Saki's phone to learn more about her, only to find it contains multiple searches about sex. Saki almost catches her, but Naoya takes the blame and is punished. Nagisa reveals while preparing her confession she forgot to attend school. Naoya insists they spend all day studying, though it soon becomes clear Nagisa struggles at math. Despite claiming she has to use the bathroom as an excuse to cheat, she gets the answers wrong anyway. At school, Saki insists no one can know about their relationship, but when Naoya sees Nagisa has no friends, he attempts to reveal everything, only for Saki to stop him. Saki reveals she is worried people will think Naoya no longer cares about her. However, when Nagisa agrees they should only interact at home, Saki is touched by the offer and instead decides they can interact in secret where others cannot see them.
3	3	"A Place for Three"; Transliteration: "Sannin no Basho" (Japanese: 三人の場所)	Masaharu Tomoda	Mayumi Morita	Satoshi Kuwabara	July 17, 2021
The three decide to eat lunch together in the gym storeroom, which has a padlocked door to ensure privacy but an open window they use as an entrance. Saki realizes with Nagisa and Naoya doing cooking and household chores and Naoya doing his best to make both girls equally happy, she is not actually bringing anything to the relationship and fears Naoya will soon prefer Nagisa over her. She becomes determined to do something for Naoya, but with sex not an option, she tries cooking but burns the curry. Desperate to impress Naoya, Saki creeps into his room to try and have sex, but he turns her down. She then becomes upset, believing he prefers Nagisa's larger breasts and returns to her parents' house, which is only next door. Nagisa feels guilty enjoying being alone with Naoya. Naoya tries various ways to apologize and exhausts himself over three sleepless days, but Saki rejects him every time. Still feeling guilty, Nagisa decides to help and tricks Naoya into groping her breast where Saki can see, which causes Saki to rush back in a jealous rage, where Nagisa insists she talk to Naoya.
4	4	"Girlfriend and Girlfriend"; Transliteration: "Kanojo to Kanojo" (Japanese: 彼女と彼女)	Kazuya Fujishiro	Kazuhiko Inukai	Satoshi Kuwabara	July 24, 2021 (Note: This episode aired at 2:35 a.m. JST, 10 minutes after the original air time.)
Saki admits she feels inferior to Nagisa and it annoys her that Naoya does everything without asking for anything in return. Surprisingly, Nagisa agrees that Naoya does too much for them. Naoya realizes by taking all the responsibility, he was actually being selfish. With Saki back home, Naoya passes out from his three days accumulated exhaustion. Saki and Nagisa debate how exactly they will become equals and realize they both like gaming. Nagisa is terrible at gaming and Saki feels better knowing there is something she is better at and they become friends. While watching another player called Milika streaming her games online, Naoya sees a school uniform in her thumbnail and realizes Milika attends their school. During lunch in the gym storage, Saki forgets to lock the window and another girl, Rika Hoshizaki, climbs in. Naoya panics and accidentally admits everything, amusing Rika who teases them about revealing their secret, until Nagisa recognizes her as Milika, causing Rika to also panic. As everyone now has secrets they do not want revealed, they all agree to keep quiet. Realizing they are actually decent people despite their unusual relationship, Rika decides she wants to join them as Naoya's third girlfriend.
5	5	"A Third One!?"; Transliteration: "Sanninme!?" (Japanese: 三人目！？)	Fumio Maezono	Keiichirō Ōchi	Satoshi Kuwabara	July 31, 2021 (Note: This episode aired at 3:00 a.m. JST, 35 minutes after the original air time.)
Saki and Nagisa deduce Rika only wants a boyfriend in case her fans begin stalking her. Naoya admits he does not like Rika at all, and refuses to date her as her motivations are shallow and selfish. Having never been rejected before, Rika attempts to entice him, but he resists, telling her to stay away from him. An accidental comment by Saki reveals they are living together so Rika offers to pay the rent and bills. However, when Naoya still rejects her, she flees. The next day, Rika follows them home and begins living in a tent in the backyard, shooting risqué exercise videos in her Milika persona to keep warm overnight and earn money to buy items needed to live outdoors. The next day, Rika realizes exercising has made her stink and is forced to improvise a shower wearing a bikini. The girls realize Rika might actually be stubborn enough to live in their backyard indefinitely. To keep Naoya's mind away from Rika, they attempt to seduce him in the bath wearing bikinis, but their nervousness and Naoya worrying about the Rika situation means it does not go to plan. In the end, Naoya makes them feel better by promising to spend more time with them and less time worrying about Rika.
6	6	"Tsun Is Dere"; Transliteration: "Tsun ga Dere" (Japanese: ツンがデレ)	Masami Hata	Keiichirō Ōchi	Satoshi Kuwabara	August 7, 2021
Naoya convinces himself he does not like Rika at all, and is determined to get rid of her in any way possible, as he is worried he might be too weak-willed to resist her forever. The girls decide to help get rid of her by donating her belongings to charity. Rika tries to stop them by convincing passersby Naoya is a groper, but he refuses to let her go despite everyone staring and even offers to replace everything if she leaves. Rika cannot understand why an admitted two-timer refuses to date her and he explains it is because he is committed to making Saki and Nagisa happy. This makes Rika develop a real crush on him. Rika's father appears and learns everything Rika has been doing, including her risqué Milika videos, so he takes her phone to permanently shut down her account. However, Naoya stops him as he knows Rika is an artist and how much work she has put into developing her Milika persona. Naoya defending her turns Rika's crush into actual love. She agrees to go home to think, but only if her dad allows her to keep her Milika account. Saki and Nagisa become depressed over how much more trouble Rika might cause now she actually loves Naoya.
7	7	"The Girlfriends' Challenge"; Transliteration: "Kanojo-tachi no Charenji" (Japanese: 彼女たちのチャレンジ)	Atsuji Kaneko	Kazuhiko Inukai	Satoshi Kuwabara	August 14, 2021
Saki's mother, who does not know about Nagisa, is concerned Saki and Naoya are not having sex. Saki realizes due to Naoya's easily flustered personality and determination to treat his girlfriends fairly, he might never have sex with either of them. She attempts to seduce him as a bunny girl, but he insists on their no sex rule and when he does touch her breasts, Saki panics and punches him, but is happy she aroused him. Nagisa becomes suspicious when she finds the bunny costume in the laundry and confronts Naoya. Naoya insists nothing happened so Nagisa comes to believe he has a costume fetish and dresses as a sexy maid. Naoya is aroused but still sticks to the rule. That night, Nagisa accidentally calls Naoya "Master" in front of Saki, who luckily decides she misheard it. At school, Rika tries to talk to Naoya. Erroneously believing she is angry he rejected her, he offers to let her humiliate him online. Naoya's clumsy attempt to apologize only make her want to confess her love, so she instead thanks him for saving her Milika account. She later admits to herself she loves Naoya, which is overheard by Saki.
8	8	"Obviously in Love"; Transliteration: "Dō Mite mo Suki" (Japanese: どう見ても好き)	Kōki Onoue	Mayumi Morita	Satoshi Kuwabara	August 21, 2021
Rika talks to Naoya casually in class so Saki jealously insists he stay by her side, though Naoya mistakenly believes Saki is just lonely. While escaping Rika, they are forced to change for PE in the same room. Nagisa lures Rika to the roof with the photo she kept proving Milika is a student at the school, allowing Saki and Naoya to escape. Later, Nagisa admits to being jealous Saki and Naoya got to be close all day. Saki offers to leave them alone so they can cuddle, but Naoya insists she stays to watch. Saki is surprised watching makes her excited and wonders if she might have an NTR fetish, so she punishes Naoya. Rika continues to talk with Naoya, who starts to suspect Rika might have a crush on him. The girls, happy Naoya is so dense, convince him Rika is probably in heat and after any available man. Naoya is mistakenly convinced this happens to all women and offers himself to Saki and Nagisa should they encounter the same problem. Naoya apologizes to Rika for thinking she had a crush on him, embarrassing her in class, so she drags him away for a private talk.
9	9	"The Tsun's Dere Gets Outed"; Transliteration: "Tsun no Dere ga Bare" (Japanese: ツンのデレがバレ)	Shigeru Fukase	Kazuhiko Inukai	Minami Nashida; Satoshi Kuwabara	August 28, 2021 (Note: This episode aired at 2:30 a.m. JST, 5 minutes after the original air time.)
Naoya explains why he thought Rika liked him when really she was just in heat, causing her to become furious at the obvious lie and at Naoya for believing it. In the end, she claims to just have a cold. Naoya explains that if she did like him, he would still turn her down so as not to upset Saki or Nagisa. Rika stubbornly tells Naoya she likes him in front of the whole class then drags him to the gym storeroom where she reveals her plan, to keep flirting with him until he falls in love with her. However, when he keeps on refusing, she snaps and kisses him before running away. Another girl from the class overhears this from outside the storeroom. Saki and Nagisa are depressed Rika kissed Naoya first, but Saki decides it was not a real kiss since it was a surprise with no emotion, so when she kisses Naoya, it will be the real first kiss. Naoya is confused about everything so he apologizes and suggests a fresh start by going on a date, something they have all been too busy to do yet, so Saki demands a hot spring date.
10	10	"Can't Wait for the Hot Springs"; Transliteration: "Onsen Tanoshimi" (Japanese: 温泉楽しみ)	Fumio Maezono	Mayumi Morita	Takashi Kamei; Satoshi Kuwabara	September 4, 2021
The other girl, Shino Kiryū, tries to talk to Naoya but Saki prevents it. While Naoya, Saki, and Nagisa are out shopping for the hot spring date, they are followed by Rika. Nagisa wonders if she should try to kiss Naoya, but when she sees how much Rika kissing Naoya has stressed Saki out, she decides to support her instead. Rika soon learns about the date. Shino is determined to find out if Naoya is two-timing Saki. The trio head to Hakone where Naoya decides they will do everything they cannot do in their hometown, so he holds both Saki and Nagisa's hands at the same time. Saki suspects they might have sex during the trip. They find Rika is already at their hotel, as is Shino who confirms Naoya is two-timing Saki with Nagisa. However, Nagisa blackmails Rika with her Milika photo into pretending she came with her and not with Naoya. When Naoya learns about Nagisa's self-sacrificing plan, he is unwilling to leave her out of the date, sneaks onto the roof and asks that she join him and Saki, but she refuses and runs away. Now inadvertently alone with Rika, she decides to seduce him.
11	11	"Hot Spring Tropes"; Transliteration: "Onsen de Arigachi na Koto" (Japanese: 温泉でありがちなこと)	Yuri Uema	Keiichirō Ōchi	Satoshi Kuwabara	September 11, 2021
Rika is shocked their kiss did not make Naoya obsessed with her, so she decides to just have a normal conversation. Their talk abruptly ends when Rika's towel accidentally falls off. As Naoya flees, he falls into the women's hot spring where Shino is bathing. After getting over her embarrassment, she demands to know if he is cheating on her friend Saki. Naoya tries to flee so she grabs him, causing him to fall and her towel to come loose. Saki and Nagisa enter the hot spring at that moment and see Shino on top of Naoya. While Saki is frustrated, Shino learns that Rika kissed Naoya, and Nagisa realizes what probably happened and takes a photo to blackmail Shino. After getting exposed naked, Shino flees and Saki punishes Naoya. Nagisa tries to leave them alone, having promised to support Saki, but Naoya refuses to leave her out. They are caught by other hotel guests so Naoya is punished again by Saki and kicked out of the woman's bath. Saki tells Nagisa she does not have to put herself aside so much and Nagisa explains she is used to having to work extra hard just to be average, which is why she is happy Naoya accepted her and is happy with their current relationship.
12	12	"Girlfriend, Girlfriend"; Transliteration: "Kanojo mo Kanojo" (Japanese: カノジョも彼女)	Kimiharu Mutō	Keiichirō Ōchi	Satoshi Kuwabara	September 18, 2021
Nagisa explains the first time she saw Naoya, she instantly fell in love with him and devoted herself to becoming his ideal woman. Naoya overhears this and tells her to stop holding back. Embarrassed he heard everything, Nagisa flees. Shino bumps into Rika and when Nagisa, Naoya and Saki run past, they join the chase. Nagisa insists she has to stay subordinate to Saki or their whole relationship will fail. Saki, Rika, and Shino fall back from exhaustion so Nagisa and Naoya continue without them. Naoya eventually catches her and insists that whatever problems occur, he will fix it. The others catch up and Nagisa kisses Naoya on the check admits to Shino she is also dating Naoya, shocking her. Saki accepts this and happily declares they are now rivals for the position of senior girlfriend before they flee from Shino and Rika and finally begin enjoying their vacation. Later, Shino criticizes Naoya for two-timing and Saki for accepting it, but is shocked when Naoya reveals he plans to tell Saki's mother, though Saki furiously forbids this. Unable to accept this, Shino decides to somehow split them up for Saki's sake and to get over her secret feelings for Naoya. Shino later becomes furious when she learns that Rika also loves Naoya and accuses him of being a three-timer, in which he corrects her that he is only two-timing, which she does not accept either.

=== Season 2 (2023) ===
No. overall	No. in season	Title	Directed by	Written by	Storyboarded by	Original release date
13	1	"Get 'Em Go Go Summer Break!!"; Transliteration: "Ike Ike Gō Gō Natsuyasumi" (Japanese: いけいけゴーゴー夏休み)	Takatoshi Suzuki	Keiichirō Ōchi	Takatoshi Suzuki	October 7, 2023 (Note: This episode aired at 2:38 a.m. JST, 15 minutes after the original air time.)
Shino acknowledges that Saki and Nagisa are living with Naoya, but she decides that she cannot tolerate the harem setup he has and that he should focus on one girl only. The group studies together in preparation for the upcoming exams, with emphasis on Nagisa, as she is the weakest at studying, and if she fails, she will not be able to enjoy their summer break. Rika drugs Naoya and brings him over to her house, where she tries to tempt him into dating her by showing off her adorable little sister. Naoya points out that anyone who would date someone to play around with their very young little sister is definitely suspicious and asks Rika if she actually thought this through; she relents after realizing this. Rika later rents a house next door to Naoya.
14	2	"Welcome, Shino-san"; Transliteration: "Irasshai Shino-san" (Japanese: いらっしゃい紫乃さん)	Akira Mano	Keiichirō Ōchi	Hitoyuki Matsui	October 14, 2023
Shino has moved into their shared home with the goal of making sure Naoya chooses Saki and not Nagisa, and so that she can get over her own crush on Naoya.
15	3	"Get Yourself Together"; Transliteration: "Shikkari Shite" (Japanese: しっかりして)	Haruka Watanabe	Keiichirō Ōchi	Takatoshi Suzuki	October 21, 2023
The group all go together to watch fireworks, Saki gets separated from Naoya and so he spends time with Nagisa, helps Shino after her sandal strap snaps, and turns down Rika.
16	4	"Fireworks with the Girlfriends"; Transliteration: "Kanojo to Hanabi" (Japanese: カノジョと花火)	Shūji Saitō	Kazuhiko Inukai	Yoshiaki Okumura	October 28, 2023
Naoya meets up with Saki and she asks him to kiss her, but backs out at the last second, and they watch some of the fireworks together and have a talk. Shino is upset at Saki not kissing Naoya and their lack of progress and she questions if Saki really loves Naoya.
17	5	"Getting Ready with the Girlfriends"; Transliteration: "Kanojo to Kakugo" (Japanese: カノジョと覚悟)	Hitoyuki Matsui	Keiichirō Ōchi	Hitoyuki Matsui	November 4, 2023
Shino is still unable to let go of her feelings for Naoya. After Saki receives camping gear, the group decide to go camping. However, they have difficulty setting up the tent and starting a fire, but Rika and her sister arrive to help. Rika proves to be quite experienced at camping as she helps out with the tent and fire. She also reveals herself to be the one who sent the camping gear so they can go camping with her. Naoya and the girls then fall asleep, except for Rika, who has dosed their food with a sleeping drug so she can spend time with Naoya.
18	6	"The Girlfriends' Resignations"; Transliteration: "Kanojo no Kakugo" (Japanese: カノジョの覚悟)	Yoshito Hata	Kazuhiko Inukai	Hitoyuki Matsui	November 11, 2023
Naoya wakes up handcuffed to a tree as Rika moves the girls into the tent. Rika then attempts to make Naoya love her and even strips down to her underwear to tempt him. When this does not work, Rika handcuffs them together, but Naoya manages to get the key to the cuffs, leading the two to fight over it. They soon calm down and Naoya soon makes a deal: he will spend time with her for five months and will reject her after the deadline, unless she can win his heart before then. She accepts the challenge and the two spend the night with each other before reuniting with the other girls, who were searching for them. Naoya then explains his plan involving Rika to them. They then continue to enjoy the rest of their camping trip.
19	7	"Nights with the Girlfriends"; Transliteration: "Kanojo-tachi to no Yoru" (Japanese: カノジョたちとの夜)	Yoshiaki Okumura	Keiichirō Ōchi	Takatoshi Suzuki	November 18, 2023
After returning home, Rika moves in with Naoya and the other girls, still intending to win Naoya over before the deadline. The girls then argue over who should sleep with Naoya for the night. Shino spends the night with Naoya first. Rika spends the night with him the next day wearing a lion costume. After Naoya comes home from work, it is Nagisa's turn to spend the night with him and she dresses up as a nurse. Saki overhears this and intends to get the advantage over the others. When it is her turn to spend the night with Naoya, she brings him several men's magazines, though things turn rough for Naoya.
20	8	"Unyielding Feelings"; Transliteration: "Yuzurenai Omoi" (Japanese: ゆずれない想い)	Haruka Watanabe	Kazuhiko Inukai	Masayoshi Nishida	November 25, 2023
The girls decide they want to go on a vacation, Saki asks if they can go to Hawaii, but Naoya confirms they cannot afford it and indicates Okinawa is a viable option. Shino offers to cover their lodging through her family home, and this allows them to plan an extended multi-day trip. While preparing for the trip, Naoya and the girls go swimsuit shopping. During the shopping trip, Rika figures out that Shino likes Naoya and threatens to expose this to everyone unless Shino helps her get close to Naoya.
21	9	"Vacay with the Girlfriends"; Transliteration: "Kanojo to Bakansu" (Japanese: カノジョとバカンス)	Shuji Saito	Keiichirō Ōchi	Yoshiaki Okumura	December 2, 2023
During the plane ride, Naoya indicates he has a severe fear of air travel, and the girls have to calm him down. In Okinawa, they have a fun first day. Nagisa privately talks with Naoya, asking if he and Saki are gonna kiss, he tells her that he will stop messing around and will kiss Saki. However, they are overheard by Rika, who declares to stop them from kissing. However, when Naoya and Saki attempt to go somewhere private, Rika blackmails Shino into stopping them and she manages to knock him out. Rika then pulls Naoya away from the girls into an empty room and locks the door. She restrains Naoya and prepares to seduce him.
22	10	"Her Resolve"; Transliteration: "Kanojo no Ketsui" (Japanese: カノジョの決意)	Yoshito Hata	Kazuhiko Inukai	Jun Hatori	December 9, 2023
After Rika traps Naoya in a room together with her, she kisses him all over his body, hoping to make him fall for her, but it has no effect on him and it actually calms him down. Rika expresses herself that she does not want Naoya to kiss anyone but her, and that she wants him all to herself. However, he does openly expresses he hates her with a passion and threatens to report her to the police, which angers her even further. Eventually, the other girls break in just as Rika is about to rape Naoya. She is forced to escape, but still refuses to give up. Later on, Shino and Naoya have a talk on a cliff, and after Shino drops an important article of clothing that Naoya gifted her in the past, she jumps in and almost drowns. Naoya saves her but swims the wrong way, and they end up stranded on an uninhabited island. Naoya tells Shino to strip naked because her swimwear is wet and cold, and he helps start a fire. Shino decides to stop being passive and admits to Naoya she has a long running crush, but does not necessarily clarify it is him. When she sees that he cut his hand making the fire, she pushes him to the ground. Unable to hold her feelings any longer, she kisses him on the lips, which leaves him shocked and a little weirded out.
23	11	"Her Resolve, and Then"; Transliteration: "Kanojo no Ketsui, Sorekara" (Japanese: カノジョの決意 それから。)	Yoshiaki Okumura	Keiichirō Ōchi	Masayoshi Nishida	December 16, 2023
Naoya and Shino continue to spend the night on the deserted island as the other girls continue their search for them. The next morning, Shino suffers from a fever and after putting her bikini back on, Naoya proceeds to carrying her back to the mainland where they are found by the Saki, who kisses him. Back in their cabin, Rika is angered that they kissed and is upset that Shino did not keep anyone else from kissing Naoya. Shino then tells her what happened. When she announces that she plans to leave, Saki gets angry and insists that she explains why. Naoya stops her, causing Shino to run out. Rika finds Shino out on the beach, who has decided to leave after all as she considers herself an issue due to her holding back her feelings for Naoya.
24	12	"Her Resolve, and..." Transliteration: "Kanojo no Ketsui, Soshite" (Japanese: カノジョの決意 そして。)	Takatoshi Suzuki	Keiichirō Ōchi	Takatoshi Suzuki	December 23, 2023
Rika convinces Shino to not hide from her feelings and then runs off after bringing Naoya and the others to her via text messages. After stopping her from running away, Naoya and Saki urge to explain her issues, and she finally confesses her crush on Naoya; Saki insists that Naoya accept Shino as his third girlfriend before reconciling with her. As they continue their vacation, Naoya strengthens her relationship with Shino, even though he does not exactly have a crush on her at all. Sometime later, Shino heads home first and meets up with the others after they return from their vacation. She promises to support them from now on. However, the girls discover that Nagisa has not kissed Naoya yet, causing him to try and get her to kiss him. The episode ends with photographs from their vacation.
