= List of U.S. states and territories by income =

This has lists of U.S. states, territories, and Washington, D.C. by income. Data is from various sources, such as the Bureau of Labor Statistics and the yearly American Community Survey (ACS). Data is less frequent for American Samoa, Guam, the Northern Mariana Islands and the U.S. Virgin Islands. (Note: The U.S. Census Bureau collects data for the 50 states, the District of Columbia and Puerto Rico every year (in American Community Survey estimates). However, the U.S. Census Bureau collects data for American Samoa, Guam, the Northern Mariana Islands and the U.S. Virgin Islands only once every 10 years.)

Average or mean full-time wage in the United States was $80,115 in 2023.

The median income is the income amount that divides a population into two groups, half having an income above that amount, and half having an income below that amount. The average is higher than the median because there are a small number of individuals with very high earnings, and a large number of individuals with relatively low earnings.

Some of the table data is for full-time workers. Some is for households, which the Federal Reserve defines as: "A group of people living in the same home, regardless of their relationship to one another." Investopedia defines families as "those related by birth, marriage, or adoption who live under the same roof."

Per capita income (according to Investopedia) "counts every individual adult and child, even newborn babies, as a member of the population."

== Yearly median income ==
Map of states by annual increase of median household income in 2010–2019

=== States ranked by median household income (2013 to 2023) ===
Data given in inflation-adjusted dollars. Tables do not reflect the margin of error in the values.

States and D.C. ranked by median household income. Average annual growth rate 2013–2023, %
States and D.C.	2023	2022	2021	2019	2018	2017	2016	2015	2014	2013	Growth rate
United States	$77,719	$74,755	$69,717	$65,712	$63,179	$60,336	$57,617	$55,775	$53,657	$52,250	3.07%
Washington, D.C.	$108,210	$101,027	$90,088	$92,266	$85,203	$82,372	$75,506	$75,628	$71,648	$67,572	4.82%
Massachusetts	$99,858	$94,488	$89,645	$85,843	$79,835	$77,385	$75,297	$70,628	$69,160	$66,768	4.11%
New Jersey	$99,781	$96,346	$89,296	$85,751	$81,740	$80,088	$76,126	$72,222	$71,919	$70,165	3.58%
Maryland	$98,678	$94,991	$90,203	$86,738	$83,242	$80,776	$78,945	$75,847	$73,971	$72,483	3.13%
New Hampshire	$96,838	$89,992	$88,465	$77,933	$74,991	$73,381	$70,936	$70,303	$66,532	$64,230	4.19%
California	$95,521	$91,551	$84,907	$80,440	$75,277	$71,805	$67,739	$64,500	$61,933	$60,190	4.73%
Hawaii	$95,322	$92,458	$84,857	$83,102	$80,212	$77,765	$74,511	$73,486	$69,592	$68,020	3.43%
(Washington (state)) Washington	$94,605	$91,306	$84,247	$78,687	$74,073	$70,979	$67,106	$64,129	$61,366	$58,405	4.94%
Utah	$93,421	$89,168	$79,449	$75,780	$71,414	$65,358	$65,977	$62,912	$60,922	$59,770	4.57%
Colorado	$92,911	$89,302	$82,254	$77,127	$71,953	$69,117	$65,685	$63,909	$61,303	$58,823	4.68%
Connecticut	$91,665	$88,429	$83,771	$78,833	$76,348	$74,168	$73,433	$71,346	$70,048	$67,098	3.17%
Virginia	$89,931	$85,873	$80,963	$76,456	$72,577	$71,535	$68,114	$66,262	$64,902	$62,666	3.68%
Alaska	$88,121	$86,631	$77,845	$75,463	$74,346	$73,181	$76,440	$73,355	$71,583	$72,237	2.01%
Minnesota	$85,086	$82,338	$77,720	$74,593	$70,315	$68,388	$65,599	$63,488	$61,481	$60,702	3.43%
Rhode Island	$84,972	$81,854	$74,008	$71,169	$64,340	$63,870	$60,596	$58,073	$54,891	$55,902	4.28%
Delaware	$82,174	$81,361	$71,091	$70,176	$64,805	$62,852	$61,757	$61,255	$59,716	$57,846	3.57%
(New York (state)) New York	$82,095	$79,557	$74,314	$72,108	$67,844	$64,894	$62,909	$60,850	$58,878	$57,369	3.65%
Vermont	$81,211	$73,991	$72,431	$63,001	$60,782	$57,513	$57,677	$56,990	$54,166	$52,578	4.44%
Illinois	$80,306	$76,708	$72,205	$69,187	$65,030	$62,992	$60,960	$59,588	$57,444	$56,210	3.64%
Oregon	$80,160	$75,657	$71,562	$67,058	$63,426	$60,212	$57,532	$54,148	$51,075	$50,251	4.78%
Arizona	$77,315	$74,568	$69,056	$62,055	$59,246	$56,581	$53,558	$51,492	$50,068	$48,510	4.77%
North Dakota	$76,525	$71,970	$66,519	$64,577	$63,837	$61,843	$60,656	$60,557	$59,029	$55,759	3.22%
Nevada	$76,364	$72,333	$66,274	$63,276	$58,646	$58,003	$55,180	$52,431	$51,450	$51,230	4.07%
Texas	$75,780	$72,284	$66,963	$64,034	$60,629	$59,206	$56,565	$55,653	$53,035	$51,704	3.90%
Idaho	$74,942	$72,785	$66,474	$60,999	$55,583	$52,225	$51,807	$48,275	$47,861	$46,783	4.82%
(Georgia (U.S. state)) Georgia	$74,632	$72,837	$66,559	$61,980	$58,756	$56,183	$53,559	$51,244	$49,321	$47,829	4.55%
Wisconsin	$74,631	$70,996	$67,125	$64,168	$60,773	$59,305	$56,811	$55,638	$52,622	$51,467	3.79%
Nebraska	$74,590	$69,597	$66,817	$63,229	$59,566	$59,970	$56,927	$54,996	$52,686	$51,440	3.79%
Pennsylvania	$73,824	$71,798	$68,957	$63,463	$60,905	$59,105	$56,907	$55,702	$53,234	$52,007	3.57%
Maine	$73,733	$69,543	$64,767	$58,924	$55,602	$55,277	$53,079	$51,494	$49,462	$46,974	4.61%
Florida	$73,311	$69,303	$63,062	$59,227	$55,462	$52,594	$50,860	$49,426	$47,463	$46,036	4.76%
Wyoming	$72,415	$70,042	$65,204	$65,003	$61,584	$60,434	$59,882	$60,214	$57,055	$58,752	2.11%
South Dakota	$71,810	$69,728	$66,143	$59,533	$56,274	$56,521	$54,467	$53,017	$50,979	$48,947	3.91%
Iowa	$71,433	$69,588	$65,600	$61,691	$59,955	$58,570	$56,247	$54,736	$53,712	$52,229	3.18%
Montana	$70,804	$67,631	$63,249	$57,153	$55,328	$53,386	$50,027	$49,509	$46,328	$46,972	4.19%
North Carolina	$70,804	$67,481	$61,972	$57,341	$53,855	$52,752	$50,584	$47,830	$46,556	$45,906	4.43%
Kansas	$70,333	$68,925	$64,124	$62,087	$58,218	$56,422	$54,935	$53,906	$52,504	$50,972	3.27%
Indiana	$69,477	$66,785	$62,743	$57,603	$55,746	$54,181	$52,314	$50,532	$49,446	$47,529	3.87%
Michigan	$69,183	$66,986	$63,498	$59,584	$56,697	$54,909	$52,491	$51,084	$49,847	$48,273	3.66%
Missouri	$68,545	$64,811	$61,847	$57,409	$54,478	$53,578	$51,746	$50,238	$48,363	$46,931	3.86%
South Carolina	$67,804	$64,115	$59,318	$56,227	$52,306	$50,570	$49,501	$47,238	$45,238	$44,163	4.38%
Ohio	$67,769	$65,720	$62,262	$58,642	$56,111	$54,021	$52,344	$51,075	$49,308	$48,081	3.49%
Tennessee	$67,631	$65,254	$59,695	$56,071	$52,375	$51,340	$48,547	$47,275	$44,361	$44,297	4.32%
New Mexico	$62,268	$59,726	$53,992	$51,945	$47,169	$46,744	$46,748	$45,382	$44,803	$43,872	3.56%
Alabama	$62,212	$59,674	$53,913	$51,734	$49,861	$48,123	$46,257	$44,765	$42,830	$42,849	3.80%
Oklahoma	$62,138	$59,673	$55,826	$54,449	$51,924	$50,051	$49,176	$48,568	$47,529	$45,690	3.12%
Kentucky	$61,118	$59,341	$55,573	$52,295	$50,247	$48,375	$46,659	$45,215	$42,958	$43,399	3.48%
Arkansas	$58,700	$55,432	$52,528	$48,952	$47,062	$45,869	$44,334	$41,995	$41,262	$40,511	3.78%
Louisiana	$58,229	$55,416	$52,087	$51,073	$47,905	$46,145	$45,146	$45,727	$44,555	$44,164	2.80%
West Virginia	$55,948	$54,329	$51,248	$48,850	$44,097	$43,469	$43,385	$42,019	$41,059	$41,253	3.09%
Mississippi	$54,203	$52,719	$48,716	$45,792	$44,717	$43,529	$41,754	$40,593	$39,680	$37,963	3.63%

=== Territories ranked by median household income (2010 to 2021) ===
Territories ranked by median household income. Average annual growth rate 2010–2021, %
Territory	2021	2019	2018	2017	2016	2015	2014	2013	2012	2011	2010	Growth rate
Guam	—	—	—	—	—	—	—	—	—	—	$48,274 (Note: 2010 median income)	N/A
(United States Virgin Islands) Virgin Islands (U.S.)	—	—	—	—	—	—	—	—	—	—	$37,254	N/A
American Samoa	—	—	—	—	—	—	—	—	—	—	$23,892	N/A
Northern Mariana Islands	—	—	—	—	—	—	—	—	—	—	$19,958	N/A
Puerto Rico	$22,237	$20,474	$20,296	$19,343	$20,078	$18,626	$18,928	$19,183	$19,429	$18,660	$18,862	1.57%

=== States and territories ranked by median income (2019) ===
Data for the American Samoa, Guam, the Northern Mariana Islands and the U.S. Virgin Islands is given as of 2010 (source: American FactFinder). Resident population given as of the 2020 United States Census.

States and territories ranked by median income. 2019. Population, and number of households and families
State or territory	Median household income (2019), ACS	Median family income (2019)	Population (April 1, 2020)	Number of households (2019)	Number of families (2019)
United States	$65,712	$80,944	335,073,176	122,802,852	79,594,270
Washington, D.C.	$92,266	$130,291	689,545	291,570	124,978
Massachusetts	$85,843	$108,348	7,029,917	2,650,680	1,665,005
Connecticut	$78,833	$101,272	3,605,944	1,377,166	885,911
New Jersey	$85,751	$105,705	9,288,294	3,286,264	2,241,555
Maryland	$86,738	$105,679	6,177,224	2,226,767	1,462,070
(New York (state)) New York	$72,108	$89,475	20,201,249	7,446,812	4,636,356
(Washington (state)) Washington	$78,687	$94,709	7,705,281	2,932,477	1,882,896
New Hampshire	$77,933	$97,112	1,377,529	541,396	346,413
Colorado	$77,127	$95,164	5,773,714	2,235,103	1,421,844
Virginia	$76,456	$93,497	8,631,393	3,191,847	2,094,763
California	$80,440	$91,377	39,538,223	13,157,873	8,972,643
Minnesota	$74,593	$93,584	5,706,494	2,222,568	1,401,623
Illinois	$69,187	$87,771	12,812,508	4,866,006	3,059,067
Rhode Island	$71,169	$89,373	1,097,379	407,174	249,987
Hawaii	$83,102	$96,462	1,455,271	465,299	316,206
Alaska	$75,463	$91,971	733,391	252,199	163,134
Delaware	$70,176	$87,148	989,948	376,239	242,584
North Dakota	$64,577	$87,055	779,094	323,519	189,509
Pennsylvania	$63,463	$81,075	13,002,700	5,119,249	3,228,224
Vermont	$63,001	$83,458	643,077	262,767	156,153
Oregon	$67,058	$82,540	4,237,256	1,649,352	1,021,588
Wisconsin	$64,168	$81,829	5,893,718	2,386,623	1,470,116
Wyoming	$65,003	$79,946	576,851	233,128	152,859
Maine	$58,924	$76,316	1,362,359	573,618	342,894
Nevada	$63,276	$76,124	3,104,614	1,143,557	723,755
Nebraska	$63,229	$80,062	1,961,504	771,444	493,013
Iowa	$61,691	$78,152	3,190,369	1,287,221	808,802
Michigan	$59,584	$75,703	10,077,331	3,969,880	2,496,550
Florida	$59,227	$71,348	21,538,187	7,905,832	5,083,272
Kansas	$62,087	$79,006	2,937,880	1,138,329	733,489
Ohio	$58,642	$74,911	11,799,448	4,730,340	2,942,581
(Georgia (U.S. state)) Georgia	$61,980	$74,833	10,711,908	3,852,714	2,555,440
Montana	$57,153	$73,014	1,084,225	437,651	269,009
Texas	$64,034	$76,727	29,145,505	9,985,126	6,857,641
Arizona	$62,055	$74,468	7,151,502	2,670,441	1,740,704
North Carolina	$57,341	$72,049	10,439,388	4,046,348	2,630,365
Utah	$75,780	$86,152	3,271,616	1,023,855	760,968
Missouri	$57,409	$73,457	6,154,913	2,458,337	1,546,045
South Dakota	$59,533	$76,826	886,667	353,799	223,964
South Carolina	$56,227	$70,537	5,118,425	1,975,915	1,286,326
Tennessee	$56,071	$69,993	6,910,840	2,654,737	1,727,895
Indiana	$57,603	$73,876	6,785,528	2,597,765	1,639,230
Oklahoma	$54,449	$68,358	3,959,353	1,495,151	975,754
Idaho	$60,999	$72,365	1,839,106	655,859	448,979
Kentucky	$52,295	$66,183	4,505,836	1,748,732	1,129,276
Louisiana	$51,073	$65,105	4,657,757	1,741,076	1,113,831
Alabama	$51,734	$66,171	5,024,279	1,897,576	1,237,883
New Mexico	$51,945	$61,826	2,117,522	793,420	496,961
West Virginia	$48,850	$60,920	1,793,716	728,175	470,472
Arkansas	$48,952	$62,387	3,011,524	1,163,647	755,305
Mississippi	$45,792	$58,503	2,961,279	1,100,229	718,382
U.S. Virgin Islands (Note: 2010 data (population according to 2020 Census))	$37,254	$45,058	87,146	43,214	26,237
Guam	$48,274	$50,607	153,836	42,026	34,199
Puerto Rico	$20,474	$25,388	3,195,153	1,170,982	773,798
Northern Mariana Islands	$19,958	$22,455	47,329	16,035	10,714
American Samoa	$23,892	$24,706	49,710	9,688	8,834

== Per capita and household income ==
=== Per capita personal income by state (1930 to 2023) ===
Per capita personal income by state and D.C. in nominal US dollars. 1930 to 2023
States and D.C.	2023	2020	2010	2000	1990	1980	1970	1960	1950	1940	1930
United States	$68,550	$59,159	$40,526	$30,529	$19,639	$10,208	$4,208	$2,335	$1,541	$601	$621
Washington, D.C.	$100,909	$89,707	$63,182	$43,401	$26,117	$13,234	$5,528	$3,125	$2,427	$1,221	$1,314
Massachusetts	$87,812	$77,371	$52,708	$38,381	$23,115	$10,688	$4,552	$2,548	$1,857	$793	$842
Connecticut	$87,447	$77,810	$61,392	$42,857	$26,392	$12,371	$5,158	$2,860	$1,918	$931	$927
New Jersey	$80,724	$70,952	$50,740	$39,095	$24,755	$11,806	$4,909	$2,712	$1,820	$830	$851
California	$80,423	$70,058	$43,138	$33,175	$21,483	$11,950	$4,965	$2,931	$1,947	$856	$889
(Washington (state)) Washington	$79,659	$67,669	$42,327	$30,786	$20,219	$11,143	$4,400	$2,539	$1,797	$667	$657
(New York (state)) New York	$79,581	$69,886	$48,579	$35,955	$23,992	$11,006	$4,920	$2,847	$1,868	$883	$1,042
Colorado	$78,918	$64,848	$40,827	$33,872	$19,843	$11,019	$4,290	$2,461	$1,584	$548	$574
Wyoming	$77,837	$65,551	$46,395	$29,426	$18,142	$11,614	$3,704	$2,382	$1,792	$602	$582
New Hampshire	$77,260	$67,877	$46,983	$35,323	$20,681	$10,043	$3,997	$2,271	$1,373	$586	$648
Maryland	$73,849	$64,820	$49,617	$35,480	$23,104	$11,477	$4,867	$2,486	$1,702	$723	$721
North Dakota	$73,341	$61,087	$44,084	$25,842	$16,084	$9,059	$3,397	$1,909	$1,388	$352	$308
Virginia	$72,855	$61,469	$45,443	$32,631	$20,840	$10,571	$4,157	$2,050	$1,327	$480	$387
Minnesota	$71,866	$61,270	$42,539	$32,348	$19,929	$10,284	$4,117	$2,182	$1,447	$524	$547
Alaska	$71,616	$61,894	$49,543	$31,996	$23,207	$15,507	$5,911	$3,126	$2,899	...	...
Illinois	$70,953	$61,569	$42,107	$33,072	$21,024	$10,954	$4,632	$2,698	$1,842	$758	$810
South Dakota	$70,353	$59,462	$41,274	$26,727	$16,474	$8,275	$3,386	$1,940	$1,298	$357	$357
Pennsylvania	$67,839	$60,315	$42,098	$30,339	$19,566	$10,038	$4,135	$2,305	$1,552	$659	$717
Nebraska	$67,800	$56,715	$41,086	$28,924	$18,486	$9,392	$3,897	$2,216	$1,583	$440	$510
Rhode Island	$66,480	$59,061	$42,631	$30,350	$20,309	$9,901	$4,305	$2,358	$1,601	$767	$795
Vermont	$66,463	$57,974	$41,492	$29,002	$18,226	$8,793	$3,728	$1,975	$1,189	$519	$572
Oregon	$65,426	$56,504	$35,941	$28,257	$18,153	$10,237	$4,065	$2,366	$1,695	$611	$605
Texas	$65,422	$55,114	$38,910	$28,253	$17,451	$9,986	$3,782	$2,020	$1,392	$438	$407
Nevada	$65,168	$54,646	$37,288	$31,858	$20,512	$11,949	$5,191	$3,079	$2,089	$902	$834
Hawaii	$65,151	$57,030	$41,499	$29,174	$22,431	$11,872	$5,538	$2,516	$1,580	...	...
Delaware	$65,392	$55,792	$41,101	$33,810	$21,462	$10,815	$4,724	$2,873	$2,082	$1,038	$858
Wisconsin	$63,963	$55,427	$39,048	$29,493	$18,435	$10,038	$3,988	$2,270	$1,515	$548	$585
Montana	$63,918	$53,540	$36,000	$22,982	$15,740	$9,148	$3,735	$2,137	$1,678	$566	$501
Kansas	$63,732	$55,037	$39,822	$28,166	$18,436	$10,080	$3,956	$2,211	$1,481	$425	$460
Florida	$63,248	$56,556	$38,778	$29,287	$19,765	$10,153	$4,131	$2,105	$1,351	$531	$468
Maine	$63,117	$54,263	$38,018	$27,478	$17,748	$8,568	$3,569	$2,002	$1,226	$532	$574
Utah	$62,823	$51,754	$32,038	$24,162	$15,004	$8,365	$3,588	$2,122	$1,391	$484	$494
Iowa	$62,351	$52,580	$38,190	$27,341	$17,647	$9,612	$3,932	$2,085	$1,539	$494	$501
Arizona	$61,652	$52,084	$33,774	$26,271	$17,317	$9,676	$4,020	$2,162	$1,408	$506	$518
Missouri	$61,302	$52,091	$36,984	$27,857	$17,917	$9,374	$3,945	$2,226	$1,438	$520	$560
Tennessee	$61,049	$51,924	$35,908	$26,998	$16,710	$8,280	$3,264	$1,659	$1,040	$339	$321
North Carolina	$60,484	$51,759	$35,847	$27,410	$17,481	$8,350	$3,397	$1,666	$1,095	$323	$287
Ohio	$60,402	$52,875	$36,580	$28,496	$18,911	$9,928	$4,137	$2,410	$1,611	$664	$664
Indiana	$60,038	$51,716	$35,590	$28,075	$17,763	$9,368	$3,849	$2,223	$1,525	$552	$512
Michigan	$59,714	$52,780	$35,635	$30,250	$19,048	$10,232	$4,200	$2,411	$1,717	$683	$658
Idaho	$59,035	$49,057	$31,950	$25,139	$16,143	$8,857	$3,691	$1,961	$1,352	$459	$488
(Georgia (U.S. state)) Georgia	$58,581	$51,456	$34,741	$28,760	$17,831	$8,604	$3,542	$1,749	$1,087	$338	$303
Louisiana	$57,100	$50,239	$38,067	$23,907	$15,363	$8,850	$3,195	$1,715	$1,132	$365	$353
South Carolina	$56,123	$48,769	$32,747	$25,025	$16,106	$9,967	$3,225	$1,493	$943	$314	$239
Oklahoma	$55,826	$50,245	$37,157	$24,124	$16,232	$9,631	$3,634	$1,974	$1,164	$374	$365
New Mexico	$54,428	$46,629	$33,658	$23,019	$15,308	$8,649	$3,420	$2,004	$1,260	$377	$333
Arkansas	$54,347	$47,145	$32,218	$22,731	$14,621	$7,601	$2,915	$1,424	$849	$257	$224
Kentucky	$54,326	$47,019	$33,186	$24,816	$15,610	$8,154	$3,261	$1,651	$998	$322	$322
Alabama	$53,175	$45,882	$33,849	$24,258	$15,860	$7,959	$3,081	$1,585	$919	$281	$263
West Virginia	$52,585	$45,067	$32,642	$22,275	$14,607	$8,014	$3,156	$1,660	$1,051	$409	$407
Mississippi	$48,110	$42,510	$31,213	$21,628	$13,353	$8,007	$2,736	$1,267	$780	$212	$197

=== States and territories by household income percentiles (2023) ===
Data given in 2023 dollars. Tables do not reflect the margin of error in the values.

Household income percentiles for U.S. states and Washington D.C.
Region	20th Percentile	40th Percentile	Median	60th Percentile	80th Percentile	95th Percentile	Average of Top 5%	80/20 %ile ratio
United States	$31,942	$61,190	$77,719	$97,458	$155,515	>$250,000	$506,793	4.869
Washington, D.C.	$40,230	$82,575	$108,210	$141,802	$237,280	>$250,000	$774,577	5.898
Massachusetts	$36,620	$76,709	$99,858	$125,116	$204,728	>$250,000	$619,385	5.591
New Jersey	$40,109	$78,129	$99,781	$124,034	$202,071	>$250,000	$616,334	5.038
Maryland	$40,901	$77,522	$98,678	$121,503	$192,595	>$250,000	$522,117	4.709
New Hampshire	$41,591	$77,681	$96,838	$116,559	$178,673	>$250,000	$510,730	4.296
California	$37,852	$74,982	$95,521	$119,542	$194,477	>$250,000	$619,938	5.138
Hawaii	$40,078	$76,375	$95,322	$118,376	$183,132	>$250,000	$505,977	4.569
(Washington (state)) Washington	$40,100	$75,355	$94,605	$115,889	$184,724	>$250,000	$573,110	4.607
Utah	$43,949	$76,728	$93,421	$112,302	$165,245	>$250,000	$468,606	3.760
Colorado	$41,002	$74,457	$92,911	$114,447	$178,394	>$250,000	$535,056	4.351
Connecticut	$36,158	$71,846	$91,665	$114,395	$185,072	>$250,000	$637,673	5.118
Virginia	$36,799	$70,863	$89,931	$111,185	$179,813	>$250,000	$534,776	4.886
Alaska	$38,204	$70,365	$88,121	$106,200	$166,034	>$250,000	$477,622	4.346
Minnesota	$37,850	$68,223	$85,086	$103,805	$160,398	>$250,000	$496,581	4.238
Rhode Island	$33,689	$66,687	$84,972	$104,297	$163,680	>$250,000	$489,811	4.859
Delaware	$36,524	$65,012	$82,174	$100,552	$155,421	>$250,000	$477,949	4.255
(New York (state)) New York	$30,308	$62,380	$82,095	$104,135	$175,120	>$250,000	$619,178	5.778
Vermont	$34,143	$62,330	$81,211	$100,389	$151,571	>$250,000	$453,461	4.439
Illinois	$32,498	$62,716	$80,306	$100,587	$158,265	>$250,000	$514,347	4.870
Oregon	$33,136	$63,526	$80,160	$99,090	$154,420	>$250,000	$464,386	4.660
Arizona	$33,356	$61,345	$77,315	$95,772	$150,019	>$250,000	$461,017	4.498
North Dakota	$32,157	$59,560	$76,525	$92,629	$143,107	>$250,000	$399,162	4.450
Nevada	$33,167	$61,240	$76,364	$93,574	$145,825	>$250,000	$460,558	4.397
Texas	$32,173	$60,419	$75,780	$94,919	$151,411	>$250,000	$494,328	4.706
Idaho	$35,115	$61,014	$74,942	$92,127	$139,748	$243,080	$418,188	3.980
(Georgia (U.S. state)) Georgia	$30,697	$58,792	$74,632	$93,247	$148,068	>$250,000	$467,103	4.824
Wisconsin	$33,182	$59,924	$74,631	$91,756	$139,442	$244,707	$418,095	4.202
Nebraska	$33,620	$60,298	$74,590	$91,593	$139,738	>$250,000	$471,960	4.156
Pennsylvania	$30,676	$58,601	$73,824	$92,477	$146,763	>$250,000	$468,603	4.784
Maine	$32,025	$58,429	$73,733	$91,132	$136,483	$249,126	$415,677	4.262
Florida	$31,559	$58,563	$73,311	$91,114	$144,290	>$250,000	$499,872	4.572
Wyoming	$31,121	$56,842	$72,415	$88,136	$132,246	$230,130	$400,071	4.249
South Dakota	$31,580	$57,073	$71,810	$89,119	$132,593	$240,472	$452,480	4.199
Iowa	$31,956	$56,845	$71,433	$87,553	$134,085	$229,713	$400,534	4.196
Montana	$30,491	$56,177	$70,804	$86,029	$132,885	$236,833	$420,968	4.358
North Carolina	$30,827	$55,724	$70,804	$87,653	$140,304	>$250,000	$443,291	4.551
Kansas	$31,352	$55,660	$70,333	$86,669	$134,863	$236,806	$398,469	4.302
Indiana	$30,501	$55,451	$69,477	$84,702	$132,018	$234,807	$393,813	4.328
Michigan	$29,594	$54,981	$69,183	$85,519	$135,855	$246,871	$409,636	4.591
Missouri	$30,420	$54,772	$68,545	$85,158	$132,469	$241,561	$410,472	4.355
South Carolina	$28,538	$53,580	$67,804	$83,916	$131,886	$245,746	$419,871	4.621
Ohio	$29,479	$53,598	$67,769	$84,874	$134,463	$246,247	$417,374	4.561
Tennessee	$28,679	$53,494	$67,631	$84,566	$133,687	>$250,000	$435,495	4.661
New Mexico	$24,403	$49,093	$62,268	$77,521	$125,783	$229,284	$378,797	5.154
Alabama	$24,744	$49,146	$62,212	$78,412	$123,395	$223,207	$388,183	4.987
Oklahoma	$25,982	$49,673	$62,138	$78,405	$121,993	$220,418	$392,351	4.695
Kentucky	$24,138	$47,445	$61,118	$76,432	$121,641	$219,944	$372,886	5.039
Arkansas	$24,357	$46,449	$58,700	$73,396	$116,085	$220,131	$364,124	4.766
Louisiana	$21,834	$44,502	$58,229	$74,636	$122,581	$227,312	$389,605	5.614
West Virginia	$23,095	$44,050	$55,948	$70,189	$112,522	$200,760	$330,270	4.872
Mississippi	$21,071	$42,400	$54,203	$69,475	$111,926	$206,135	$344,395	5.312

=== States and territories ranked by per capita income (2019 and 2020) ===
Data for the American Samoa, Guam, the Northern Mariana Islands and the U.S. Virgin Islands is given as of 2010 (source: American FactFinder). Resident population given as of the 2020 United States Census. BEA is Bureau of Economic Analysis. ACS is American Community Survey.

States and territories ranked by per capita income. 2019 and 2020. Population, and number of households and families.
State or territory	Per capita income (2019), ACS	Per capita income (2020), BEA	Disposable per capita income (2020), BEA	Population (April 1, 2020)	Number of households (2019)	Number of families (2019)
United States	$35,672	$59,510	$52,853	335,073,176	122,802,852	79,594,270
Washington, D.C.	$59,808	$86,567	$73,568	689,545	291,570	124,978
Massachusetts	$46,241	$78,458	$66,978	7,029,917	2,650,680	1,665,005
Connecticut	$45,359	$78,609	$67,110	3,605,944	1,377,166	885,911
New Jersey	$44,888	$73,460	$64,031	9,288,294	3,286,264	2,241,555
Maryland	$43,325	$66,799	$57,829	6,177,224	2,226,767	1,462,070
(New York (state)) New York	$41,857	$74,472	$62,773	20,201,249	7,446,812	4,636,356
(Washington (state)) Washington	$41,521	$67,126	$60,468	7,705,281	2,932,477	1,882,896
New Hampshire	$41,241	$67,097	$60,715	1,377,529	541,396	346,413
Colorado	$41,053	$63,776	$56,415	5,773,714	2,235,103	1,421,844
Virginia	$40,635	$61,958	$54,283	8,631,393	3,191,847	2,094,763
California	$39,393	$70,192	$60,796	39,538,223	13,157,873	8,972,643
Minnesota	$39,025	$62,005	$54,403	5,706,494	2,222,568	1,401,623
Illinois	$37,728	$62,930	$55,409	12,812,508	4,866,006	3,059,067
Rhode Island	$37,525	$60,825	$54,610	1,097,379	407,174	249,987
Hawaii	$36,989	$58,655	$52,872	1,455,271	465,299	316,206
Alaska	$36,978	$63,502	$59,053	733,391	252,199	163,134
Delaware	$36,858	$56,097	$49,804	989,948	376,239	242,584
North Dakota	$36,611	$61,530	$56,569	779,094	323,519	189,509
Pennsylvania	$35,804	$61,700	$55,271	13,002,700	5,119,249	3,228,224
Vermont	$35,702	$59,187	$53,632	643,077	262,767	156,153
Oregon	$35,531	$56,312	$49,576	4,237,256	1,649,352	1,021,588
Wisconsin	$34,568	$55,593	$49,577	5,893,718	2,386,623	1,470,116
Wyoming	$34,104	$61,855	$56,418	576,851	233,128	152,859
Maine	$34,078	$54,211	$48,939	1,362,359	573,618	342,894
Nevada	$33,575	$53,720	$48,767	3,104,614	1,143,557	723,755
Nebraska	$33,272	$57,570	$52,064	1,961,504	771,444	493,013
Iowa	$33,107	$53,478	$48,210	3,190,369	1,287,221	808,802
Michigan	$32,892	$53,259	$47,982	10,077,331	3,969,880	2,496,550
Florida	$32,887	$55,675	$50,194	21,538,187	7,905,832	5,083,272
Kansas	$32,885	$56,099	$50,579	2,937,880	1,138,329	733,489
Ohio	$32,780	$53,641	$48,390	11,799,448	4,730,340	2,942,581
(Georgia (U.S. state)) Georgia	$32,657	$51,780	$46,568	10,711,908	3,852,714	2,555,440
Montana	$32,625	$53,361	$48,127	1,084,225	437,651	269,009
Texas	$32,267	$55,129	$50,523	29,145,505	9,985,126	6,857,641
Arizona	$32,173	$49,648	$45,025	7,151,502	2,670,441	1,740,704
North Carolina	$32,021	$50,305	$45,060	10,439,388	4,046,348	2,630,365
Utah	$31,771	$52,204	$46,931	3,271,616	1,023,855	760,968
Missouri	$31,756	$51,697	$46,598	6,154,913	2,458,337	1,546,045
South Dakota	$31,550	$59,281	$54,984	886,667	353,799	223,964
South Carolina	$31,295	$48,021	$43,471	5,118,425	1,975,915	1,286,326
Tennessee	$31,224	$51,046	$47,192	6,910,840	2,654,737	1,727,895
Indiana	$30,988	$51,926	$46,872	6,785,528	2,597,765	1,639,230
Oklahoma	$29,666	$49,878	$45,727	3,959,353	1,495,151	975,754
Idaho	$29,606	$48,759	$44,138	1,839,106	655,859	448,979
Kentucky	$29,029	$47,339	$42,720	4,505,836	1,748,732	1,129,276
Louisiana	$28,662	$50,874	$46,771	4,657,757	1,741,076	1,113,831
Alabama	$28,650	$46,479	$42,392	5,024,279	1,897,576	1,237,883
New Mexico	$28,423	$46,338	$42,803	2,117,522	793,420	496,961
West Virginia	$27,446	$44,994	$41,251	1,793,716	728,175	470,472
Arkansas	$27,274	$47,235	$43,083	3,011,524	1,163,647	755,305
Mississippi	$25,301	$42,129	$39,083	2,961,279	1,100,229	718,382
U.S. Virgin Islands	$21,362	N/A	N/A	87,146	43,214	26,237
Guam	$16,549	N/A	N/A	153,836	42,026	34,199
Puerto Rico	$13,345	N/A	N/A	3,195,153	1,170,982	773,798
Northern Mariana Islands	$9,656	N/A	N/A	47,329	16,035	10,714
American Samoa	$6,311	N/A	N/A	49,710	9,688	8,834

== See also ==
- Highest-income counties in the United States
- Household income in the United States
- List of lowest-income places in the United States
- List of countries by average wage
- List of U.S. states by median wage
- Personal income in the United States
- Thank God for Mississippi
