= Aho-Girl =

Japanese manga series and its adaptation(s)

- Aho-Girl: A Clueless Girl
- First volume cover, featuring Yoshiko Hanabatake

アホガール (Aho Gāru)
- Genre: Comedy, slice of life
- Manga
- Written by: Hiroyuki
- Published by: Kodansha
- English publisher: NA: Kodansha USA
- Magazine: Weekly Shōnen Magazine; (November 28, 2012 – February 18, 2015); Bessatsu Shōnen Magazine; (June 9, 2015 – December 9, 2017)
- Original run: November 28, 2012 – December 9, 2017
- Volumes: 12
- Anime television series
- Directed by: Keizō Kusakawa; Shingo Tamaki
- Produced by: Tatsuya Ishiguro; Makoto Furukawa; Tomoyuki Oowada; Souji Miyagi; Gouta Aijima; Kenichi Iguchi; Renta Suzuki; Shuuichi Suzuki; Isao Ishikawa
- Written by: Takashi Aoshima
- Music by: Gin
- Studio: Diomedéa
- Licensed by: Crunchyroll (streaming); NA: Discotek Media (home video)
- Original network: Tokyo MX, Sun TV, BS11
- Original run: July 4, 2017 – September 19, 2017
- Episodes: 12
- icon

Aho-Girl: A Clueless Girl (Japanese: アホガール, Hepburn: Aho Gāru; lit. "Idiot Girl") is a Japanese manga series written and illustrated by Hiroyuki. It was serialized in Kodansha's shōnen manga magazine Weekly Shōnen Magazine from November 2012 to February 2015, and later moved to the publisher's Bessatsu Shōnen Magazine, where it ran from June 2015 to December 2017; its chapters were collected in 12 tankōbon volumes. A 12-episode anime television series adaptation by Diomedéa aired between July and September 2017.

== Plot ==
The story follows the everyday life of high school girl Yoshiko Hanabatake. True to the title, she is known to be exceptionally stupid academically as well as socially. She constantly hangs out with and annoys her studious and serious neighbor/childhood friend Akuru Akutsu, whom Yoshiko's mother wants her to marry. Yoshiko becomes friends with the level-headed Sayaka Sumino, who, along with Akuru, try to keep Yoshiko in check. The Public Morals Chairwoman dislikes the free-spirited Yoshiko but when Akuru makes some casual remarks that compliment her, the chairwoman falls in love with Akuru and begins stalking him while repressing her perverted thoughts. Yoshiko also befriends Ryuichi Kurosaki, a delinquent who thinks of Yoshiko as a gang leader, a group of playground kids, a group of gyaru, and some other students and staff at school.

== Characters ==
=== Major characters ===
Yoshiko Hanabatake (花畑 よしこ, Hanabatake Yoshiko)
Voiced by: Aoi Yūki
The title character of the story is a mischievous, cheerful high school girl who is stupid both academically and socially. She even gets zeroes on multiple choice tests.^{Ch. 1} However what she lacks intellectual capacity she makes up with spunk, ridiculous audacity and abundant energy when it comes to what she wants. She has light brown hair styled in long twin tails. She frequently hangs out with her neighbor, childhood best friend and classmate Akuru much to his annoyance. Her favorite food is bananas.^{Ch. 9} She fails to realize when people are annoyed at her, often mistaking it as a person's desire to play or become her friend.
Akuru Akutsu (阿久津 明, Akutsu Akuru)
Voiced by: Tomokazu Sugita, Makoto Koichi (young)
Akuru is a smart, reclusive and serious high school student who is constantly annoyed by Yoshiko's antics. The reason he and Yoshiko are classmates is because he chose to attend a local high school as the really academic schools were too far away for him to study properly. He scolds Yoshiko for her idiotic behavior, even resorting to punches.^{Ch. 1} He prefers to study, and does not have a girlfriend or any friends besides Yoshiko, although Sayaka agrees to be his friend out of pity, even though he has no desire to obtain more friends.^{Ch. 3} A recurring gag is that he is never able to get a perfect score on any exam, always falling a few marks short.^{Ep.7}
Sayaka Sumino (隅野 さやか, Sumino Sayaka)
Voiced by: Sayaka Harada
Akuru and Yoshiko's classmate who ends up becoming friends with the two. She has blond hair that goes over her shoulders and wears her school uniform with white knee socks. She too is level-headed and assumes the straight-man role,^{Ch. 2} often moderating interactions between Yoshiko and others.^{Ch. 56, 66} She is kind and worries about being boring.^{Vol. 2 profiles} She is very sensitive, especially when others point out her small chest, which appears slightly small, even after she pads it. She sometimes loses her patience.^{Ch. 3, 22, 66}
Fuki Iincho (風紀委員長, Fūki Iinchō; lit. "morals chairman", manga: Head Monitor,^{Vol. 2 profile} anime: Disciplinary Committee President^{Ep. 1})
Voiced by: Sumire Uesaka
A high school upperclassman who is in charge of morals at the school. She has long dark hair. She cannot stand Yoshiko's idiocy. When Akuru starts complimenting her by accident, saying unintentionally princely things like "If (Yoshiko) gives you any more trouble let me know." and "She's a hundred times more attractive than (Yoshiko)", she develops a major crush on Akuru.^{Ch. 5} She starts stalking him, and often has lewd fantasies about him.^{Ch. 7, 11, 16, 25} Yoshiko considers her a love rival because of her breast size.^{Ch. 5} In many instances she tries to reach out to Akuru but her interactions give her a reputation of being just as weird, even though she is initially unaware of that, but with Sayaka's help she eventually discovers her true nature and tries to mend her ways but with little result.^{Ch. 7, 32-33, 53} She is fairly smart academically, placing in the top 5 of her class,^{Ch. 73} but later requests to repeat a grade so that she can be in the same school year as Akuru.^{Ch. 96}

=== Supporting characters ===
Yoshie Hanabatake (花畑 よしえ, Hanabatake Yoshie)
Voiced by: Yoko Hikasa
Yoshiko's mother who is constantly worrying about her daughter, but brightens up to the fact that Akuru pays attention to her and secretly hopes he and Yoshiko can marry, keeping it a secret out of fear of how Akuru would react.^{Ch. 2} She hatches several schemes to have Yoshiko flirt with Akuru but they often backfire.^{Ch. 8} At first she perceives Sayaka to be a threat to marry Akuru but after checking her panties are that of a child, she deems her safe,^{Ch. 14} but finds the Chairwoman to be a far more serious threat.^{Ch. 43} She is shown to be somewhat psychotic, given her drastic methods and the obscene nature of her schemes. ^{Ep. 3} ^{Ep. 5} ^{Ep. 10}
Ryuuichi Kurosaki (黒崎 龍一, Kurosaki Ryūichi)
Voiced by: Taku Yashiro
A delinquent guy whom Yoshiko interacts with, he becomes Yoshiko's disciple, calling her anego (アネゴ; "big sister").^{Ch. 4, 6} He tries to become friends with Akuru but fails because of his shyness, and ends up acting more like his underling.^{Ch. 29} While he may seem stupid, Ryuuichi has proven himself to be very smart as he once stayed home and studied even placing higher than Akuru who was shocked that Ryuuichi was skilled in academics.
Ruri Akutsu (阿久津 瑠璃, Akutsu Ruri)
Voiced by: Sayaka Senbongi
Akuru's younger sister who is in the fifth grade. She is worried she will become an idiot like Yoshiko as she struggles academically,^{Ch. 10} and that even her brother tells her to give up - even giving her a guidebook on how to get through life without a degree as a birthday present. She admires Sayaka because she helps tutor her a little bit.^{Ch. 18}
Playground kids
Voiced by: Shiori Izawa
Voiced by: Yuka Iguchi
Voiced by: Rena Maeda
Two boys (Mamoru and Tadashi) and a girl (Nozomi (希)) whom Yoshiko meets at the playground. They are concerned about Yoshiko's desires to just play all day and not study. Nozomi is kind to others and especially gullible to Yoshiko and her teachings.^{Ch. 12, 17, 27}
Atsuko Oshieda (押枝 あつこ, Oshieda Atsuko)
Voiced by: Rina Satō
Yoshiko's homeroom teacher. She tries to teach Yoshiko but with not much luck. She becomes painfully aware of her singleness because of Yoshiko.^{Ch. 15, 21, 28} She loves Yoshio (Yoshiko in disguise).
Dog (犬, Inu)
Voiced by: Daisuke Namikawa
A big dog that Yoshiko takes a liking to and would like to ride like a horse.^{Ch. 17, 24} Akuru likes him too as he seems to understand his feelings.^{Ch. 48}
Rinko Inui (乾 凛子, Inui Rinko)
A second-year student who takes a liking to Yoshiko and treats her like a dog, even with commands like sit and stay. Her facial expression is difficult to read.^{Ch. 31, 35}
Akane Eimura (栄村 茜, Eimura Akane)
Voiced by: M·A·O
The leader of a trio of gyaru classmates whom Yoshiko starts interacting with later in the series. They do not really like her, but they are just as dumb as Yoshiko in school.^{Ch. 57, 58} Akane has red hair and is the most antagonistic of the three against Yoshiko.^{Ch. 151}. However, she tends to listen and participate in Yoshiko's schemes, and is sometimes unwillingly manipulated by her. She dislikes Akuru, who calls her ugly. She also wants to be more popular and have a boyfriend.^{Ch. 62, 66, 75}
Kii Hiiragi (柊 姫衣, Hīragi Kii) .
Voiced by: Rena Maeda
The second of the gyaru trio classmates.^{Ch. 57, 58} She has short blond hair and usually has an indifferent facial expression to people and romance.^{Ch. 97, 151}
Kuroko Shiina (椎名 黒子, Shīna Kuroko)
Voiced by: Yuka Iguchi
The third of the gyaru classmates.^{Ch. 57, 58} She has long dark hair.^{Ch. 81, 97, 151} She is only one of the three who has a boyfriend (Toshi), although she is extremely shy about it.^{Ch. 57, 58, 81}

== Media ==
=== Manga ===
Written and illustrated by Hiroyuki, Aho-Girl started in Kodansha's Weekly Shōnen Magazine on November 28, 2012. A crossover one-shot with Love Hina was released on August 27, 2014. The series finished its serialization in Weekly Shōnen Magazine on February 18, 2015, and was transferred to Bessatsu Shōnen Magazine on June 9 of that same year, and concluded on December 9, 2017.

Kodansha USA has licensed the manga for English release in North America.

No.	Original release date	Original ISBN	English release date	English ISBN
1	May 17, 2013	978-4-06-384871-7	July 18, 2017	978-1-63236-457-9
Chapters 1–19
The volume introduces the main characters for the series: Yoshiko Hanabatake, a stupid and clueless high school girl; her classmate and neighbor Akuru Akutsu who loves to study but is annoyed by her shenanigans; Yoshiko's mom devises schemes for the two to be together in romantic situations; Sayaka Sumino, a classmate that becomes friends with the two; Ryuichi Kurosaki, a delinquent guy who looks up to Yoshiko; the school's Head Monitor, a girl who despises Yoshiko, but develops an obsessive crush on Akuru; Akuru's little sister Ruri, who also struggles academically; the neighborhood kids at the playground that Yoshiko hangs out with; and Atusko Oshieda, who is Yoshiko's homeroom teacher. Other stories include: Yoshiko and Akuru watch a PreCure film, Sayaka visits Yoshiko's mom, The Head Monitor hides a photo of Akuru from Yoshiko, Yoshiko meets a big dog, Yoshiko interrupts Ruri and Sayaka's study session, Yoshiko tries to comfort Akuru over his grades by acting like a mom.
2	October 17, 2013	978-4-06-394954-4	August 29, 2017	978-1-63236-458-6
Chapters 20–30; Extra: "Aho-Girl's Morning Off"; Chapters 30–36
Yoshiko plays Concentration with Akuru. Oshieda-sensei tries to tutor Yoshiko in reading comprehension. Yoshiko, Sayaka and the Head Monitor break into Akuru's room to find out what he would like for his birthday. Yoshiko and the Head Monitor try to be body sushi models. Yoshiko brings home Dog and buys an expensive banana. Yoshiko's mom confronts the Head Monitor. While hiking, Akuru lays banana-based traps for Yoshiko. Yoshiko and the playground kids attend a super sentai show. Oshieda-sensei trains Yoshiko to be a Japanese idol. Yoshiko helps Ryuichi relate to Akuru. Yoshiko tutors Ruri on her times tables. Yoshiko meets Rinko Inui, who thinks of Yoshiko like a pet. The Head Monitor confiscates Akuru's phone; she later tries to text Akuru, but Yoshiko has the phone and sends her weird replies. Yoshiko is so inspired from eating a banana that she and Sayaka go out to find the grower to thank him. Akuru puts some bananas on a pole to keep Yoshiko entertained.
3	April 17, 2014	978-4-06-395057-1	October 24, 2017	978-1-63236-459-3
Chapters 37–54; Special Edition: "Yoshiko & the Dog Go for a Walk"
Yoshiko makes Akuru buy the Head Monitor a bra for a birthday present. Yoshiko celebrates the beginning of summer vacation. Yoshiko and the playground kids catch cicadas. Yoshiko's mom uses Ryuichi to put Akuru to sleep so that she can blackmail Akuru into marrying Yoshiko. Sayaka has a sleepover at Yoshiko's. Yoshiko and the gang go to the beach and enjoy the hot springs and staying up late. Ruri is upset that Akuru did not invite her, so Akuru tries to treat her with parfaits. Akuru bonds with Dog while Yoshiko is out of town. Akuru gets a part-time job as a fast food clerk until Yoshiko bothers him. Yoshiko upstages a group of Obon Festival dancers. Yoshiko drags Ruri along to rush to her radio calisthenics session. Yoshiko dresses up as a guy to give Oshieda-sensei a summer romance. Sayaka catches the Head Monitor stalking Akuru and lays the truth behind how she is being perceived. Akuru has to apologize to Ruri for getting her a lousy birthday present.
4	August 16, 2014	978-4-06-395166-0	December 12, 2017	978-1-63236-460-9
Chapters 55–71; Special Edition: "Be-Bop Banana Froppuccino Deluxe"
Yoshiko takes Sayaka out in a typhoon so she can be carried into the air by an umbrella. Yoshiko and Akuru argue over what name to give Dog. Yoshiko causes trouble for three gyaru classmates: Akane Eimura, Kii Hiragi, and Kuroko Shiina. She helps Kuroko call her boyfriend. Sayaka buys some grown-up panties, but Yoshiko's mother disapproves. Yoshiko helps the playground kids shop for snacks for their field trip. The Head Monitor is sick and calls for Akuru to come nurse her, only to unknowingly get Yoshiko. Akane gets in a conflict with Akuru and Yoshiko and volunteers herself to head her class in the school festival. Yoshiko distracts Akane and the gang the night before with some running around the school games. Yoshiko finds the Head Monitor rejecting a guy and tells her to let him fondle her. Sayaka gets drunk at an after-festival party. Akuru recalls when he and Yoshiko first met 10 years ago. Ruri tries to ride a bicycle. Yoshiko dresses up as Yoshio-kun again in order to break up with Oshieda-sensei. Yoshiko plays dolls with the playground kids. Yoshiko and Dog meet Sayaka's Pomeranian. Yoshiko beats up a delinquent gang for disrespecting bananas.
5	January 16, 2015	978-4-06-395293-3	February 13, 2018	978-1-63236-533-0
Chapters 72–76; Special Edition: "Akkun Grows Up"; Chapters 77–79; Special Edition: "Yoshiko and the Hot New Toy"; Chapters 80–85; Special Edition: "A Day in the Life of a Dog"
Akuru tries training Yoshiko like a dog. The Head Monitor tries to study with Akuru. Yoshiko confuses an insurance saleswoman. Akane tries to pierce her ears. Yoshiko's mother hopes to spend a romantic night with her husband but has to stop Yoshiko from interfering. Akuru deals with a boy who has been bullying Ruri. Yoshiko deals with mosquitos. Yoshiko and Akuru praise Sayaka for her niceness like she's an angel. Akuru calls the police on the Head Monitor for rummaging through his trash. Akane and Yoshiko tail Shiina as she goes on a date with her boyfriend. Ryuichi discovers that Akuru likes Dog, and feels jealous. Yoshiko catches a cold and Akuru has to nurse her. Yoshiko tries to find Sayaka's birthday wishes. Yoshiko outdoes an old fisherman.
6	May 15, 2015	978-4-06-395393-0	April 24, 2018	978-1-63236-534-7
Chapters 86 and 87; Special Edition: "A Dream of Curry"; Chapters 88–91; Special Edition: "Christmas + Yoshiko"; Chapters 92–94; Special Edition: "New Year's, a Birthday, and Yoshiko"; Chapters 95–97; Special Edition: "The Longest Day"
Yoshiko visits Akane at her home, and they read a manga together. The Head Monitor tries to befriend Ruri, but Yoshiko's mom gets in the way. Nozomi tells the playground boys that she wants to be like Yoshiko. Oshieda-sensei misses Yoshio, so Yoshiko puts on Yoshio's wig and brings her to her house. When Yoshiko's banana is partly run over by a car, Yoshiko tries to cope by meditating in a waterfall. Yoshiko and Akuru visit an arcade where Akuru plays Aitatsu to win a rare card for Ruri. Head Monitor sneaks into Akuru's room but gets trapped in his closet. Yoshiko flatters a saleswoman to get crabs for cheap. She then tries adding bananas to the crab stew, but her mother fights against it. Yoshiko makes a snow fort for the playground kids but then tries to cook mochi inside it. Head Monitor asks the principal to hold her back a year so she can stay with Akuru. To help Akane get a boyfriend, Yoshiko announces Akane's desperation on the street in public.
7	March 9, 2016	978-4-06-395610-8	June 12, 2018	978-1-63236-611-5
Chapters 98–105; "Special Episode"
At the start of their second year, Akuru tries to get Yoshiko ready for school. Sayaka gets in trouble when she says she is happy to see Yoshiko in her class. Yoshiko and Chairwoman have a showdown in the men's bathroom over the subject of their boobs. Yoshiko, the playground kids and Ruri play statues. When Akuru gets a disappointing score on the mock exam and leaves his room, Yoshiko, Sayaka and Dog track him to the outdoors where he has undergone extreme training while studying. Akane worries about her career choices. Realizing Yoshiko is not making progress romantically with Akuru, Yoshiko's mom seduces a guy on the train in order to have him marry Yoshiko. Ryuuichi upstages Akuru on midterms in order to be friends with him.
8	October 7, 2016	978-4-06-395754-9	August 28, 2018	978-1-63236-612-2
Chapters 106–112; "Special Episode"
9	June 9, 2017	978-4-06-395953-6	October 30, 2018	978-1-63236-652-8
Chapters 113–119
10	October 6, 2017	978-4-06-510239-8; 978-4-06-397026-5 (SE)	December 31, 2018	978-1-63236-651-1
"School Trip" (1–10); Special Edition: "The Attack on Aoi Yuki-san!"
11	November 9, 2017	978-4-06-510629-7; 978-4-06-397027-2 (SE)	February 5, 2019	9781632367150
Chapters 120–125; "Special Bonus!"
12	December 15, 2017	978-4-06-510583-2; 978-4-06-397028-9 (SE)	April 16, 2019	978-1-63236-716-7
Chapters 126–130; "I'd Do Anything for You"

=== Anime ===
A 12-episode anime television series adaptation produced by Diomedéa aired from July 4 to September 19, 2017, on Tokyo MX, Sun TV, and BS11. Keizou Kusakawa served as the chief director, with Shingo Tamaki also as a director, and Takashi Aoshima as the script writer. The episodes are 15 minutes long. The opening theme is "Zenryoku Summer!" (全力☆Summer!; 'Full Power Summer!'), performed by Angela. The ending theme is "Odore! Kyūkyoku Tetsugaku" (踊れ!きゅーきょく哲学), performed by Sumire Uesaka, who also voices the Disciplinary Committee President.

Crunchyroll simulcasted the series in multiple regions.

No.	Title (Note: English episode titles are taken from Crunchyroll.)	Director	Original release date
1	"She's Here! Aho Girl!" "Kitazo! Aho Gāru" (Japanese: 来たぞ！アホガール)	Shingo Tamaki	July 4, 2017
Yoshiko Hanabatake is a stupid high school girl, that she even gets zeroes on her multiple choice tests. She loves eating bananas. She hangs out with her studious classmate and neighbor Akuru Akutsu, who is frequently annoyed by her antics and does not hesitate to physically scold Yoshiko. Akuru has to wake Yoshiko up every morning, and deal with her mom, who is hoping that Akuru will marry Yoshiko to take care of her. Their classmate Sayaka Sumino discovers Akuru does not have any friends and decides to be his friend. On the way to school, Yoshiko comes in conflict with the Public Morals Chairwoman, but when Akuru starts acting nice to her, the Chairwoman falls in love with Akuru.
2	"Aho Girl Multiplies!" "Fueru! Aho Gāru" (Japanese: 増える！アホガール)	Mitsuri Tenpei	July 11, 2017
Yoshiko plays with some elementary school kids at the park, until Akuru interferes and proceeds to reprimand the aforementioned children for playing with Yoshiko. Yoshiko confronts a delinquent student Ryuichi Kurosaki but wins him over with her idiocy. Sayaka meets Akuru's little sister Ruri Akutsu who is having trouble in school. The Chairwoman finds Akuru at his class, but when Akuru assumes it's another bag inspection and tells her she can search him in whatever way she wants, the president gets overly excited while Yoshiko tries to stop her.
3	"Security in Senior Citizenship! Aho Girl!" "Rōgo mo Anshin! Aho Gāru" (Japanese: 老後も安心！アホガール)	Kazuki Ohashi	July 18, 2017
Yoshiko's mother is worried that the cute and innocent Sayaka might steal Akuru away from Yoshiko, and demands to check her panties. A large stray dog attacks the kids at the park, but Yoshiko tries to ride it, heedless of the consequences. Yoshiko eats domestically-grown bananas that are so good she literally sprints across Japan to personally thank the farmer, dragging Sayaka with her. Yoshiko tries to cheer up Akuru at home by acting like a mother to her baby.
4	"Charge! Aho Girl!" "Totsunyū! Aho Gāru" (Japanese: 突入！アホガール)	Shota Ibata	July 25, 2017
Yoshiko trains Ryuichi to be Akuru's friend, but he ends up being more of his servant. Yoshiko invites the kids from the park to a local Pachi Rangers hero show that she's hosting, but gets too involved in the story. Yoshiko's teacher Atsuko Oshieda attempts to tutor Yoshiko, but her efforts backfire when Yoshiko turns the topic to Oshieda's own singleness. Yoshiko, Sayaka, and the Chairwoman infiltrate Akuru's room at night to find out what birthday present he would like, but their combined idiocy leads to a series of accidents.
5	"Summertime! Aho Girl!" "Natsu da! Aho Gāru" (Japanese: 夏だ！アホガール)	Sorato Shimizu	August 1, 2017
Akuru reluctantly goes with Yoshiko and Ruri to see the latest Prechure movie, and takes drastic actions when the girls are yelling at the screen. As the group goes to pick out swimsuits for a beach trip, Akuru announces his plans to stay home and study, but Sayaka guilts him into going with his lack of friends. On the day of the trip, Yoshiko's mom sees the Chairwoman as a major rival to Yoshiko for Akuru's affection, and ruins Chairwoman's bikini top.
6	"A Hot Summer! Aho Girl!" "Atsui Natsu da! Aho Gāru" (Japanese: 暑い夏だ！アホガール)	Ageha Kochoran	August 8, 2017
During the beach trip, the Chairwoman tries to get closer to Akuru, but is buried in sand by Yoshiko. Later, at the hot springs, Yoshiko and the Chairwoman try to confirm Akuru's "size" by peeping on him. Meanwhile, Ryuichi spends the vacation trying to delay Yoshiko's mom from ruining the trip. At home, Akuru agrees to watch Yoshiko's dog, and forms a bond with him over a Western movie. A group of Obon dancers try and fail to stop Yoshiko from upstaging them at their own festival.
7	"The Gal! Aho Girl!" "Gyaru ga! Aho Gāru" (Japanese: ギャルが！アホガール)	Takuma Suzuki	August 15, 2017
While lamenting her lack of a love life, Atsuko encounters the captivating "Yoshio." Akuru and Yoshiko argue over Dog's name. Yoshiko tries to befriend some gyaru classmates. They trick Yoshiko into playing hide and seek, but then feel guilty after she disappears for three days. Ruri is greatly insulted by her brother's choice of birthday present.
8	"Like an Angel! Aho Girl!" "Tenshi no Yōna! Aho Gāru" (Japanese: 天使のような！アホガール)	Sorato Shimizu	August 22, 2017
Yoshiko pushes one of her gyaru classmates to confess her love to her boyfriend. Yoshiko helps the park kids shop for snacks for their upcoming field trip. Sayaka tries and fails to curb the Chairwoman's stalker behavior towards Akuru. Yoshiko and Dog meet Sayaka's Pomeranian.
9	"Festival! Aho Girl!" "Fesutibau! Aho Gāru" (Japanese: フェスティバゥ！アホガール)	Shōta Ibata	August 29, 2017
Akuru gets into an argument with Akane Eimura over her chairing their class's Festival Committee. Yoshiko and Akane spend the night playing games instead of working on their festival project. The class shows off a maid cafe theme. Yoshiko demands the Chairwoman leave her latest suitor with a romantic memory. Sayaka accidentally gets drunk at a karaoke bar and cries for respect from her friends.
10	"Drive! Aho Girl!" "Doraibu! Aho Gāru" (Japanese: ドライブ！アホガール)	Shingo Tamaki, Tenpei Mishio	September 5, 2017
Akane pierces her own ear with Yoshiko's help. Yoshiko and Dog race a motorcyclist down a highway. When Yoshiko plays dolls with the playground kids, she turns it into a crazy romance drama. The Chairwoman attempts to make nice with Ruri to get closer to her brother, but Yoshiko's mom shows up to stop her and they have a panty-swiping contest.
11	"Final Battle! Decisive Blow! Aho Girl!" "Kessen! Hissatsu! Aho Gāru" (Japanese: 決戦！必殺！アホガール)	Monshiro Kochōran, Shingo Tamaki	September 12, 2017
Yoshiko tries to help Ruri find something she can do well outside of classwork. When Ryuichi comes back beaten, Yoshiko decides to attack the delinquents of Dick High School to avenge the special Banana Frappuccino he went to get. Dog goes for a walk around town, saving multiple children from danger along the way.
12	"Meeting... And! Aho Girl!" "Deai... Soshite! Aho Gāru" (Japanese: 出会い...そして！アホガール)	Shingo Tamaki	September 19, 2017
Akuru flashes back to his first meeting with Yoshiko ten years ago.

== Reception ==
Volume 1 reached the 43rd place on the weekly Oricon manga chart and, as of May 18, 2013, has sold 27,861 copies; volume 2 reached the 22nd place and, as of October 27, 2013, has sold 61,653 copies; volume 3 reached the 20th place and, as of April 27, 2014, has sold 62,692 copies; volume 4 reached the 22nd place and, as of August 24, 2014, has sold 55,158 copies; volume 5 reached the 34th place and, as of January 18, 2015, has sold 27,473 copies. Volume 6 placed 24th and sold 52,198 copies over 2 weeks. Volume 7 reached number 24 with 30,236 copies sold in its first week.

== Notes ==
- "Ch." is shortened form for chapter and refers to a chapter number of the collected Aho-Girl manga
- "Ep." is shortened form for episode and refers to an episode number of the Aho-Girl anime
