= List of Girlfriend, Girlfriend chapters =

Girlfriend, Girlfriend, written and illustrated by Hiroyuki, was serialized in Kodansha's Weekly Shōnen Magazine from March 4, 2020, to May 24, 2023. Sixteen tankōbon volumes have been published from June 17, 2020, to July 14, 2023. A commercial to promote the series, starring Ayana Taketatsu and Ayane Sakura, was released on October 23, 2020.

In February 2021, Kodansha USA announced the English digital release of the series in North America and the first volume was released on April 6, 2021. The series would later be printed in two-in-one omnibus volumes starting from December 9, 2025, as part of Kodansha USA's Print Club service.

== Volumes ==
No.	Original release date	Original ISBN	English release date	English ISBN
1	June 17, 2020	978-4-0651-9743-1	April 6, 2021 (digital); December 9, 2025 (omnibus)	978-1-63-699035-4 (digital); 979-8-89478-056-6 (omnibus)
1. "Even If It's Not Right" (それが正しい道じゃなくても, Sore ga tadashii michi ja nakutemo); 2. "Negotiations to Two-Timing" (二股交渉, Futamata kōshō); 3. "That Specific Issue" (アレの問題, Are no mondai); 4. "A Night of Doubts" (疑惑の夜, Giwaku no yoru); 5. "Nagisa's Feelings" (渚の気持ち, Nagisa no kimochi); 6. "Don't Get the Wrong Idea" (幻滅されたくない, Genmetsu saretaku nai); 7. "Don't Let Anyone Know" (バレたくないから, Baretaku nai kara); 8. "A Place for the Three of Us" (3人の場所, Sannin no basho); 9. "Don't Leave Me" (捨てられたくない, Suteraretaku nai)
2	September 17, 2020	978-4-0652-0747-5	May 4, 2021 (digital); December 9, 2025 (omnibus)	978-1-63-699087-3 (digital); 979-8-89478-056-6 (omnibus)
10. "Please Come Back" (帰ってきてよ, Kaette kite yo); 11. "Because I'm..." (だって私は..., Datte watashi wa...); 12. "Girlfriend, Girlfriend" (彼女と彼女, Kanojo to kanojo); 13. "Enter Milika" (ミリカ登場, Mirika tōjō); 14. "A Third One?!" (3人目！？, Sanninme!?); 15. "I'm Not Going Anywhere" (絶対出ていかない, Zettai dete ikanai); 16. "Reason Why I Want Her to Leave" (帰したい理由, Kaeshitai riyū); 17. "For Those Two" (二人のためなら, Futari no tame nara); 18. "Hot and Cold" (ツンがデレ, Tsun ga dere)
3	November 17, 2020	978-4-0652-1409-1	June 1, 2021 (digital); March 31, 2026 (omnibus)	978-1-63-699141-2 (digital); 979-8-90074-037-9 (omnibus)
19. "What Must be Done" (やるべきこと, Yarubeki koto); 20. "When Cold Exteriors Melt" (ツンがデレデレ, Tsun ga deredere); 21. "Stay With Me" (そばにいて, Soba ni ite); 22. "So Just Embrace Her!" (抱いてやれ, Daite yare); 23. "So Obviously in Love" (どう見ても好き, Dō mite mo suki); 24. "Trying to be Coy, but It Ain't Flying!" (ツンのデレがバレ, Tsun no dere ga bare); 25. "It Doesn't Matter What You Say!" (どんなに言われても, Donna ni iwarete mo); 26. "After Kissing Someone Who's Not His Girlfriend" (彼女以外の子にキスをされた結果, Kanojo igai no ko ni kisu o sareta kekka); 27. "Excited for the Hot Springs" (温泉楽しみ, Onsen tanoshimi)
4	January 15, 2021	978-4-06-521960-7	July 6, 2021 (digital); March 31, 2026 (omnibus)	978-1-63-699209-9 (digital); 979-8-90074-037-9 (omnibus)
28. "Only on a Special Day" (非日常だからできること, Hinichijō da kara dekiru koto); 29. "I'm Fine" (私は大丈夫ですので, Watashi wa daijōbu desu no de); 30. "Alone for Five Minutes" (二人きりの5分間, Futari kiri no gofunkan); 31. "Vs. Shino" (VS．紫乃, VS. Shino); 32. "The Common Things at a Hot Spring" (温泉でありがちなこと, Onsen de arigachi na koto); 33. "What Naoya Means to Nagisa" (渚にとっての直也, Nagisa ni totte no Naoya); 34. "Me Too, I'm..." (私だって, Watashi datte); 35. "Nagisa Is a Girlfriend Too!" (渚も彼女, Nagisa mo kanojo); 36. "Two-Timing Is...!" (二股なんて絶対に, Futamata nante zettai ni)
5	April 16, 2021	978-4-06-522885-2	September 7, 2021 (digital); December 5, 2026 (omnibus)	978-1-63-699345-4 (digital); 979-8-90074-038-6 (omnibus)
37. "Wake Up, Naoya" (目覚めて直也, Mezamete Naoya); 38. "In That Case, I..." (それなら私は, Sore nara watashi wa); 39. "Using My Sister" (妹を使おう, Imōto o tsukaō); 40. "A Blissful Time" (幸せな時間, Shiawase na jikan); 41. "Let's Gooo! Summer Break!" (イケイケゴーゴー夏休み, Ike ike gō gō natsuyasumi); 42. "Please, Shino-san" (お願い紫乃さん, Onegai Shino-san); 43. "Let's Live Together" (一緒に住む！, Issho ni sumu!); 44. "Shino and Saki" (紫乃と咲, Shino to Saki); 45. "Shino and Naoya" (紫乃と直也, Shino to Naoya)
6	June 17, 2021	978-4-06-523588-1	November 2, 2021 (digital); December 5, 2026 (omnibus)	978-1-63-699456-7 (digital); 979-8-90074-038-6 (omnibus)
46. "Were You...?" (もしかして, Moshi ka shite); 47. "Welcome, Shino-san" (いらっしゃい紫乃さん, Irasshai Shino-san); 48. "Hang in There" (しっかりして, Shikkari shite); 49. "Girlfriends and Fireworks ①" (花火と彼女①, Hanabi to kanojo ①); 50. "Girlfriends and Fireworks ②" (花火と彼女②, Hanabi to kanojo ②); 51. "Girlfriends and Fireworks ③" (花火と彼女③, Hanabi to kanojo ③); 52. "Girlfriends and Fireworks ④" (花火と彼女④, Hanabi to kanojo ④); 53. "Girlfriends and Fireworks ⑤" (花火と彼女⑤, Hanabi to kanojo ⑤); 54. "Girlfriends and Fireworks ⑥" (花火と彼女⑥, Hanabi to kanojo ⑥)
7	August 17, 2021	978-4-06-524478-4	January 4, 2022 (digital); June 16, 2026 (omnibus)	978-1-63-699548-9 (digital); 979-8-90074-034-8 (omnibus)
55. "It's Not Fair" (ずるい, Zurui); 56. "Girlfriends and Resolutions ①" (彼女と覚悟①, Kanojo to kakugo ①); 57. "Girlfriends and Resolutions ②" (カノジョと覚悟②, Kanojo to kakugo ②); 58. "Girlfriends and Resolutions ③" (カノジョと覚悟③, Kanojo to kakugo ③); 59. "Girlfriends and Resolutions ④" (カノジョと覚悟④, Kanojo to kakugo ④); 60. "Girlfriends and Resolutions ⑤" (カノジョと覚悟⑤, Kanojo to kakugo ⑤); 61. "Girlfriends and Resolutions ⑥" (カノジョと覚悟⑥, Kanojo to kakugo ⑥); 62. "Girlfriends and Resolutions ⑦" (カノジョと覚悟⑦, Kanojo to kakugo ⑦); 63. "The Final Five Months" (決着の5か月間, Ketchaku no Gokagetsukan)
8	October 15, 2021	978-4-06-525143-0	March 1, 2022; June 16, 2026 (omnibus)	978-1-63-699641-7 (digital); 979-8-90074-034-8 (omnibus)
64. "The Night with Shino" (紫乃との夜, Shino to no yoru); 65. "The Night with Milika" (ミリカとの夜, Mirika to no yoru); 66. "The Night with Nagisa" (渚との夜, Nagisa to no yoru); 67. "The Night with Saki" (咲との夜, Saki to no yoru); 68. "Titty Showdown" (チチバトル, Chichi batoru); 69. "Attack of the Parents ①" (親、襲来, Oya, shūrai); 70. "Attack of the Parents ②" (親、襲来 ②, Oya, shūrai ②); 71. "That Aside..." (それはそれとして, Sore wa sore to shite); 72. "Milika and Shino" (ミリカ&紫乃, Mirika & Shino)
9	January 17, 2022	978-4-06-526606-9	June 7, 2022	978-1-68-491207-0
73. "Unshakeable Feelings" (ゆずれない想い, Yuzurenai omoi); 74. "Girlfriends on Vacation ①" (カノジョとバカンス①, Kanojo to bakansu ①); 75. "Girlfriends on Vacation ②" (カノジョとバカンス②, Kanojo to bakansu ②); 76. "Girlfriends on Vacation ③" (カノジョとバカンス③, Kanojo to bakansu ③); 77. "Girlfriends on Vacation ④" (カノジョとバカンス④, Kanojo to bakansu ④); 78. "Girlfriends on Vacation ⑤" (カノジョとバカンス⑤, Kanojo to bakansu ⑤); 79. "Girlfriends on Vacation ⑥" (カノジョとバカンス⑥, Kanojo to bakansu ⑥); 80. "Her Determination ①" (カノジョの決意①, Kanojo no ketsui ①); 81. "Her Determination ②" (カノジョの決意②, Kanojo no ketsui ②)
10	April 15, 2022	978-4-06-527541-2	October 11, 2022	978-1-68-491484-5
82. "Her Determination ③" (カノジョの決意③, Kanojo no ketsui ③); 83. "Her Determination ④" (カノジョの決意④, Kanojo no ketsui ④); 84. "Her Determination ⑤" (カノジョの決意⑤, Kanojo no ketsui ⑤); 85. "Her Determination ⑥" (カノジョの決意⑥, Kanojo no ketsui ⑥); 86. "Her Determination ⑦" (カノジョの決意⑦, Kanojo no ketsui ⑦); 87. "Her Determination ⑧" (カノジョの決意⑧, Kanojo no ketsui ⑧); 88. "Her Determination ⑨" (カノジョの決意⑨, Kanojo no ketsui ⑨); 89. "Her Determination ⑩" (カノジョの決意⑩, Kanojo no ketsui ⑩); 90. "Her Determination. And..." (カノジョの決意。そして。, Kanojo no ketsui. Soshite.)
11	June 17, 2022	978-4-06-528183-3	December 13, 2022	978-1-68-491590-3
91. "Clean Up" (後始末, Atoshimatsu); 92. "Got Zero Results" (なんの成果もあげられませんでした, Nan no seika mo age raremasendeshita); 93. "Alcohol Is for Those Who Are 20 and Over" (お酒は20歳から, O sake wa 20-sai kara); 94. "What's Important Is the Second Time" (2度目が肝心, 2-Dome ga kanjin); 95. "I Don't Know How to Kiss" (キスのやりかたがわかりません, Kisu no yarikata ga wakarimasen); 96. "Let's Study Hard" (お勉強を頑張りましょう, O benkyō o ganbarimashō); 97. "What About the Future?" (将来どうするの？, Shōrai dō suru no?); 98. "Chase Your Dreams!" (夢に向かってゴー, Yume ni mukatte gō); 99. "Let's Get Through Those Tests!" (テストを乗り越えろ！, Tesuto o norikoero!)
12	September 16, 2022	978-4-06-529133-7	February 14, 2023	978-1-68-491701-3
100. "Nagisa's Path" (渚の進路, Nagisa no shinro); 101. "Milika and Tests" (ミリカとテスト, Mirika to tesuto); 102. "Curious About That" (アレが気になります, Are ga ki ni narimasu); 103. "The Greatest Crisis" (最大の危機, Saidai no kiki); 104. Oh Crap, Naoya!" (やばい直也, Yabai Naoya); 105. "The Power from All of Us" (みんなのちから, Min'na nochi kara); 106. "Nagisa and Mother" (渚と母, Nagisa to haha); 107. "Nagisa and the Future" (渚と将来, Nagisa to shōrai); 108. "Exam Results" (テストの結果, Tesuto no kekka)
13	November 17, 2022	978-4-06-529710-0	April 25, 2023	978-1-68-491888-1
109. "Celebration" (お祝い, Oiwai); 110. "Other People" (他人, Tanin); 111. "Girlfriends and Dates" (カノジョとデート, Kanojo to dēto); 112. "A Date with Nagisa ①" (渚とデート①, Nagisa to dēto ①); 113. "A Date with Nagisa ②" (渚とデート②, Nagisa to dēto ②); 114. "A Date with Shino ①" (紫乃とデート①, Shino to dēto ①); 115. "A Date with Shino ②" (紫乃とデート②, Shino to dēto ②); 116. "A Date with Milika ①" (ミリカとデート①, Mirika to dēto ①); 117. "A Date with Milika ②" (ミリカとデート②, Mirika to dēto ②)
14	February 17, 2023	978-4-06-530629-1	July 11, 2023	979-8-88-933036-3
118. "A Date with Milika ③" (ミリカとデート③, Mirika to dēto ③); 119. "A Date with Milika ④" (ミリカとデート④, Mirika to dēto ④); 120. "A Date with Saki ①" (咲とデート①, Saki to dēto ①); 121. "A Date with Saki ②" (咲とデート②, Saki to dēto ②); 122. "A Date with Saki ③" (咲とデート③, Saki to dēto ③); 123. "After the Dates" (デートを終えて, Dēto o oete); 124. "Things That Cannot be Erased" (消せないもの, Kesenai mono); 125. "Things That Cannot be Lost" (無くせないもの, Nakusenai mono); 126. "Normalcy" (普通, Futsū)
15	April 17, 2023	978-4-06-531265-0	September 12, 2023	979-8-88-933142-1
127. "Saki and the Three's Feelings ①" (咲と3人の気持ち①, Saki to 3-ri no kimochi ①); 128. "Saki and the Three's Feelings ②" (咲と3人の気持ち②, Saki to 3-ri no kimochi ②); 129. "Saki and the Three's Feelings ③" (咲と3人の気持ち③, Saki to 3-ri no kimochi ③); 130. "Saki and the Three's Feelings ④" (咲と3人の気持ち④, Saki to 3-ri no kimochi ④); 131. "What Comes After" (二股の先へ, Futamata no saki e); 132. "Girlfriends and Kisses" (彼女とキス, Kanojo to kisu); 133. "The Final Battle ①" (最後の戦い①, Saigo no tatakai ①); 134. "The Final Battle ②" (最後の戦い②, Saigo no tatakai ②); 135. "The Final Battle ③" (最後の戦い③, Saigo no tatakai ③)
16	July 14, 2023	978-4-06-532187-4	January 9, 2024	979-8-88-933324-1
136. "The Final Battle ④" (最後の戦い④, Saigo no tatakai ④); 137. "The Final Battle ⑤" (最後の戦い⑤, Saigo no tatakai ⑤); 138. "The Final Battle ⑥" (最後の戦い⑥, Saigo no tatakai ⑥); 139. "The Final Battle ⑦" (最後の戦い⑦, Saigo no tatakai ⑦); 140. "The Final Battle ⑧" (最後の戦い⑧, Saigo no tatakai ⑧); 141. "The Final Battle ⑨" (最後の戦い⑨, Saigo no tatakai ⑨); 142. "The Final Battle ⑩" (最後の戦い⑩, Saigo no tatakai ⑩); 143. "After the Battle" (決着のあと, Ketchaku no ato); 144. "Girlfriend, Girlfriend" (カノジョも彼女, Kanojo mo kanojo)
