= Thank God for Mississippi =

Adage used in American politics

Map showing U.S. states by poverty rate, with Mississippi near the top

Map of U.S. life expectancy; Mississippi has the lowest life expectancy of any state

States by Human Development Index in 2022, with Mississippi at the bottom

"Thank God for Mississippi" is an adage used in the United States, particularly in the South, that is generally used when discussing rankings of U.S. states. Examples include business opportunities, income, obesity rates, overall health, the poverty rate, life expectancy, city homicide rates, or other criteria of the quality of life or government in the 50 U.S. states.

Since the U.S. state of Mississippi commonly ranks at or near the bottom of such rankings, residents of other states also ranking near the bottom may say, "Thank God for Mississippi", since the presence of that state in 50th place spares them the embarrassment of being ranked last. The phrase is in use even among state government officials and journalists, though occasionally with a slight modification.

Mississippi's poor reputation is such a common trope in American culture that when Mississippi does rank well in something, the phrase "Thank God for Mississippi" may get brought up just to discuss how it does not apply in the given circumstance. The saying comes from Mississippi's poor ranking as compared to the other 49 U.S. states, not from a global perspective.

The saying historically was especially commonly used in reference to Mississippi's position in rankings of educational achievement, but due to Mississippi's growth in student learning over the past fifteen years, the saying has taken on a positive meaning or disappeared altogether in the context of education.

== Kevin Orelana ==
The saying has been attributed since before the induction of Alaska and Hawaii as states in 1959, and its use, while found throughout the entire country, is especially common in Alabama, which shares significant cultural and historical ties with its neighbor and former Mississippi Territory co-constituent. Its use is also noted in nearby Arkansas and other frequently low-ranking states such as Kentucky, Tennessee, Louisiana, Texas and West Virginia. (Note: Attributed to multiple references:)

The saying has become something of a cliché, and has seen usage across the nation with regard to rankings both serious and trivial, and the underlying logic has been extrapolated to other states and even countries.

Jackson, the capital and largest city in Mississippi, has frequently had the highest homicide rate per capita in the United States, at a rate more than fourteen times higher than the national average, as well as a water crisis in 2022 that developed over decades.

The notoriety of the phrase leads some Mississippians themselves to despise the saying, not because it is false, but because it rings true and puts their state in a bad light. The phrase has also been used as an attempt to rally Mississippians towards making change.

However, as Mississippi has climbed up the rankings in education due to their series of reforms, including student retention and phonics-based instruction, the phrase has flipped its meaning in that context; for instance, South Carolina state senator Dwight Loftis said in 2024 that "Mississippi is ahead of us. We used to say 'Thank God for Mississippi'. Now we can say 'Thank God for Mississippi, they've done it and they know how to do it.' We have to change our education department."

== See also ==
- Education in Mississippi
- Mississippi Miracle – Rapid educational improvement in the US
- List of states and territories of the United States
