= Mississippi miracle =

Rapid educational improvement in the US

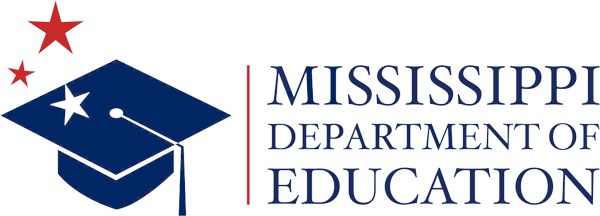
Mississippi Department of Education

The Mississippi Miracle is the rapid improvement of K–12 student performance in Mississippi since 2013, widely attributed to a series of policy, curriculum, and pedagogical changes initiated at the state level. The term can also be used to generally refer to improvements in student test scores in other southern states that implemented similar changes, which has also been dubbed the "Southern surge". The positive changes followed decades of low academic performance in the state and likely helped minimize some of the negative educational impacts of the COVID-19 pandemic.

Mississippi students were performing a full grade level below their peers around the country as recently as 2013, but by 2024, they were performing nearly half a grade level above the average U.S. student. The Miracle has been accredited to various causes working together, principally driven in Mississippi by the Literacy-Based Promotion Act (LBPA) and in other states by similar forces and trends.

== Background ==
In 2002, national No Child Left Behind legislation imposed penalties on public schools with poor standardized test scores in English and mathematics. Because Mississippi education policies did not vary significantly from the rest of the United States at this time, No Child Left Behind is believed to be the root cause behind the rise in Mississippi test scores throughout the 2000s. Mississippi did not outpace the country in scoring at any point in the 2000s. In 2013, the National Assessment of Educational Progress (NAEP) ranked Mississippi in 49th place nationally for fourth-grade literacy, with the average fourth-grade student receiving a reading score of 209, considerably lower than the national average of 221. At the school district level, since No Child Left Behind evaluated and punished schools on an annual basis, Mississippi schools would repeatedly attempt short-term reforms which were quickly abandoned at the end of the year.

In 2010, Mississippi joined PARCC as a move towards implementing Common Core state standards. Policy makers theorized that higher standards could come about by changing methods rather than increasing resources. Governor Phil Bryant called for a complete overhaul of educational standards, grounded in Florida's 2003 A-Plus Literacy Act which ended social promotion of illiterate students. Unlike No Child Left Behind, which punished low-performing schools, Florida's law assigned additional resources to schools with widespread retention or low test scores. Mississippi's similar Literacy-Based Promotion Act, a bill introduced to improve students' reading skills "so that every student completing third grade reads at or above grade level," was sponsored by 7 Republicans and 1 Democrat. The bill garnered support from both parties, including all but 2 Republicans and 14 Democrats in the House. It passed both houses of the Mississippi Legislature by wide margins, having passed the Senate 51–0, and the House 113–5–2. It was then signed into law on April 18, 2013.

Mississippi Department of Education civil servant Kymyona Burk was tasked with implementing the law and was promoted as the first state literacy director. Burk subsequently hired Carey Wright as an expert in early childhood education.

Similar circumstances inspired Florida, Louisiana, Tennessee, and Arkansas, among other states, to tackle their own struggling education systems.

== Literacy-Based Promotion Act ==
Mississippi's LBPA contained four different fundamental provisions meant to ensure student success.

=== Support for teachers ===
Money was devoted to hiring highly trained reading coaches to support students, as well as literacy-based professional development for all teachers.

=== Early detection of literacy problems ===
Schools began to screen students at a young age for issues in literacy. Students who demonstrate a lack of literacy proficiency are brought to grade level through school provided specialized services.. Tests are given three times annually from kindergarten through third grade.

=== Supporting struggling readers ===
Schools were given direction on how to best address student educational gaps. Non-proficient children receive an Individualized Reading Plan made in conjunction with parents.

=== Mandatory retention of students who do not pass a 3rd-grade reading test ===
Students in 3rd grade are given multiple opportunities to pass a reading test, often known as the "third-grade gate". Students who repeatedly earn less than a passing grade on the test are retained and do not proceed to fourth grade. These students are assigned to a teacher with expertise in helping struggling readers. While precise figures are hard to come by, it is estimated that roughly 6.5% of Mississippi third-graders were held back in 2023, with the vast majority of these students having failed to pass the reading test.

Mississippi Governor Tate Reeves said of introducing mandatory retention of struggling students:

Many folks said, "Look, you can't do that. If you do that, fifty percent of our kids are going to be held back or sixty percent of our kids are going to be held back." But we had the exact opposite experience. What actually happened is we raised the level of expectations, and Mississippians did what Mississippians do. They rose up and they met those increased expectations.

== Results ==
The NAEP gives a standardized, nationwide test to fourth-grade students in both reading and mathematics. The Urban Institute adjusts the results by demographics, adjusting for income, race, and other factors correlated with variance in academic achievement.

After adjusting for demographics Mississippi was the nation's #1 state in reading as well as in mathematics. Demographic adjustments were calculated by how each individual student who takes the NAEP scores relative to students nationwide who are the same gender, age, race or ethnicity, free or reduced-price lunch receipt status, special education status, and English language learner status. This was the state whose students' performance increased the most from 2013 until 2022, despite the COVID-19 pandemic which contributed to depressed scores nationwide.

Even without any adjustments for demographics, Mississippi ranks ninth in fourth-grade literacy. African-Americans in Mississippi outperform African-Americans in 47 of the other 49 states in reading; Mississippi's Hispanic students lead the nation for their demographic in reading (and second place in math).

These improvements are also taking place in Arkansas, Florida, and Louisiana, though less drastically.

These results also hold true (though less dramatically) in math; as students across the four southern states experience more success in reading, they are also showing more progress in math.

This growth has carried over to a large degree to eighth-grade students. While in 2013, Mississippi students were 13 points behind their nationwide peers in both reading and mathematics, by 2023, the gap had narrowed to just 6 points in the former and 7 points in the latter. However, Mississippi officials are aware that the improvement of older students is not as dramatic as that of younger students, and steps are being taken to address this.

== Louisiana ==
Louisiana students have also historically performed very poorly compared to their peers across the nation. After implementing their own literacy reforms, including the Steve Carter Literacy Program, scores have risen dramatically; after adjusting for demographics, Louisiana now ranks in the top ten states for education nationally. Alongside Mississippi, Louisiana is one of only six states whose scores improved from 2013 to 2022.

State Superintendent Cade Brumley said, "Look, we're very excited. Our team is excited, teachers are excited, the governor is excited—everyone is happy about the progress. I am thankful too. This is a place we've never been as a state. But too many kids can't read on grade level. Too many can't do math. And too many are still stuck in schools that are failing them. We've got a ton of work to do."

== Impact ==
Whole language learning and balanced literacy is on the decline nationally as a result of districts and states around the country noticing the Mississippi Miracle. Other states, such as New York and Wisconsin, are implementing phonics-based curricula and strategies, sometimes referred to as the Science of reading.

Other states have taken notice; South Carolina state senator Dwight Loftis said in 2024 that "Mississippi is ahead of us. We used to say 'Thank God for Mississippi'. Now we can say 'Thank God for Mississippi, they've done it and they know how to do it.' We have to change our education department."

States that did not implement the reforms that Mississippi, Louisiana, Arkansas and Florida utilized have suffered; Oklahoma, for instance, passed a bill in 2012 that mirrored the LBPA, only to pass a new law two years later that defanged the law. This was done to avoid actually holding back the students that could not read at grade level. Oklahoma's scores have since plummeted and the state ranks near the bottom of the NAEP's list.

UFLI, a Science of Reading project of the University of Florida, has led to tremendous student growth in reading, both inside and outside of Florida.

U.S Secretary of Education chair Linda McMahon invoked 'The Mississippi Miracle' during her 'Returning Education to the States Tour', in which she highlighted decentralized, state‑led education models that align with The Trump administration's goal of shifting federal control of education to states and communities after Donald Trump ordered the closing of The Department of Education.

== Criticism ==
Some have criticized the improvements in test scores, claiming that they are at least partially attributable to policies that "game" the statistics. An editorial article by Wainer et al. asserts:

It is disappointing, but not surprising, that the lion's share of the effects of the "Mississippi miracle" are yet another case of gaming the system. There is no miracle to behold. There is nothing special in Mississippi's literacy reform model that should be replicated globally. It just emphasizes the obvious advice that, if you want your students to get high scores, don't allow those students who are likely to get low scores to take the test. (Note: The article was later edited, having incorrectly stated that Mississippi ranked last in 4th and 8th grade math scores in 2024; the correct figures were 16th and 35th, respectively.)

== See also ==
- Phonics
- Reading
- Science of reading
- Structured literacy
