= Jackpot Girls =

Japanese manga series

- First tankōbon volume cover

ドリーム☆ジャンボ☆ガール (Dorīmu Janbo Gāru)
- Genre: Comedy; Yuri
- Manga
- Written by: Hiroyuki
- Published by: Kodansha
- English publisher: NA: Kodansha USA
- Imprint: Shōnen Magazine Comics
- Magazine: Weekly Shōnen Magazine
- Original run: May 28, 2025 – present
- Volumes: 7
- icon

Jackpot Girls (Japanese: ドリーム☆ジャンボ☆ガール, Hepburn: Dorīmu Janbo Gāru), also known as Dream Jumbo Girl, is a Japanese manga series written and illustrated by Hiroyuki. It began serialization in Kodansha's Weekly Shōnen Magazine in May 2025, and has been compiled into seven volumes as of November 2026.

== Plot ==
The series follows two best friends, Chie Ōno and Kanae Yumemura. Chie is a high school girl who is aiming to enter the University of Tokyo, but does not like studying and is worried about the current state of the economy. On New Year's Eve, Kanae decides to share with Chie one hundred lottery tickets, wanting to help Chie financially. To their shared amazement, they win the lottery, with the two sharing the grand prize of 700 million yen. However, Chie's surprise leads to her losing focus on her exams in favor of following stocks, causing her to fail the entrance exams. With them now graduating from high school and facing an uncertain future, the two decide to live an exciting life using their newfound riches to buy whatever they want.

== Characters ==
Chie Ōno (大野 千恵, Ōno Chie)
A high school girl and Kanae's best friend. She studied and worked hard to get grades good enough to qualify for the University of Tokyo's entrance exams, although she ends up failing due to the anxiety she faced following her winning the lottery. She and Kanae skip their graduation ceremony, instead buying a sports car.
Kanae Yumemura (夢村 叶, Yumemura Kanae)
Chie's best friend, who shared her lottery tickets with Kanae as she knew about Chie's financial issues. After they graduate, she buys them a tower suite where they could live together. She wants to spend the money they won on fun activities. She is very attached to Chie and appears to have feelings for her. She is a big fan of the underground idol Kirara Ishigami.
Mei Miyamori (宮守 芽衣, Miyamori Mei)
A high school girl that Chie and Kanae encounter on the street one day. Her family is financially struggling due to a bad loan her father made, and she was working to pay off her father's debts. After Kanae pays off the debts, she becomes Chie and Kanae's maid. Chie then makes her an account on the video sharing site MeTube to help her earn more money.
Kirara Ishigami (石上 きらら, Ishigami Kirara)
An underground idol that Kanae is a fan of. Despite working as an idol for years, she never gained much success, mostly due to her agency being small. Due to online harassment, she was forced by her agency to retire. Kanae became upset after Kirara announced her retirement, leading Kanae and Chie to tracking her down and giving her money to continue her idol career. After deciding to continue her career, she becomes a self-produced idol, with the others supporting her financially.
Nito Suenaga (末永 ニト, Suenaga Nito)
A woman who becomes suspicious of Chie and the others' newfound wealth. She stalked them and found out how they got their money, leading her to blackmail them and asks them to make her their "sugar baby". She appears to have feelings for Chie.

== Publication ==
The series is written and illustrated by Hiroyuki, who began serializing it in Kodansha's Weekly Shōnen Magazine on May 28, 2025. The first tankōbon volume was released on August 12, 2025; seven volumes have been released as of November 17, 2026. A collaboration music video with the group JELEE from the anime series Jellyfish Can't Swim in the Night was released to coincide with the release of the second volume.

In October 2026, Kodansha USA announced that it had licensed the series for English publication, with the first volume set to release in Q4 2027.

| No. | Release date | ISBN |
|---|---|---|
| 1 | August 12, 2025 | 978-4-06-540345-7 |
| 2 | October 17, 2025 | 978-4-06-541104-9 |
| 3 | December 17, 2025 | 978-4-06-541944-1 |
| 4 | March 17, 2026 | 978-4-06-542999-0 |
| 5 | May 15, 2026 | 978-4-06-543627-1 |
| 6 | August 17, 2026 | 978-4-06-544642-3 |
| 7 | November 17, 2026 | 978-4-06-545728-3 |

== Reception ==
The series has been nominated for the twelfth Next Manga Award in 2026 in the print category.
