= Social promotion =

Practice in primary and secondary education

Social promotion is an educational practice in which a student is automatically promoted to the next grade at the end of the school year, regardless of whether they have mastered the necessary material or attended school consistently. This practice typically applies to general education students as well as those in special education. The main objective is to keep students with their peers by age, maintaining their intended social grouping. Social promotion is sometimes referred to as promotion based on seat time—the time the student spends in school. It is based on enrollment criteria for kindergarten, which often requires students to be 4 or 5 years old at the start of the school year (5 or 6 years old for first graders), with the goal of allowing them to graduate from high school before turning 19.

Advocates of social promotion argue that it is done to protect students' self-esteem, foster socialization with their age cohort, encourage participation in sports teams, or promote students who may be weaker in one subject but stronger in others.

In Canada and the United States, social promotion is generally more applicable to primary education. Secondary education is more flexible, as students can take different classes based on their academic level rather than strictly by grade. This flexibility reduces the significance of social promotion. For instance, a student might study social studies with their age group while taking math with younger students, depending on their assessed math level.

In some countries, grade retention is allowed for students who have not learned the required material or who have been frequently absent. The opposite of social promotion is merit-based promotion, where students advance only after demonstrating mastery of the necessary material. This could involve either moving to the next grade or advancing to a higher-level course in the same subject. In grade-based curricula, this is known as "mid-term promotion." In course-based curricula, promotion is open-ended and depends on fulfilling prerequisites for the next course.

== Pros ==
Supporters of social promotion policies do not so much defend social promotion as argue that retention is even worse. They contend that retention is not a cost-effective response to poor performance when compared to other interventions, such as additional tutoring or summer school, which are often cheaper. These advocates cite numerous research findings indicating that retention is correlated with harms, but without proving a causal link.

The harms of grade retention, as cited by critics, include:

- Increased dropout rates over time among repeaters. For instance, studies by Allenseorth (2005) and Frey (2005) highlight that in Minnesota schools, dropout rates for retained students nearly doubled compared to non-repeaters—12.4% for non-repeaters and 27.2% for retained students. However, this study importantly compared retained students to the average student as opposed to retained students' academic peers.
- A lack of evidence supporting long-term academic benefits for retained students.
- Higher rates of mental disorders and dangerous behaviors, such as drinking, drug use, crime, teenage pregnancy, depression, and suicide among repeaters compared to promoted students, though again, this compares retained students to the average student as opposed to retained students' academic peers.
- Feelings of isolation from peers due to being in different age groups, which may lead to bullying, fewer friendships, and ridicule.

Critics of retention also point out its financial burden on school systems, as having a student repeat a grade adds an extra year of schooling for that individual, provided they do not drop out. Additionally, some parents express concern that older retained students may victimize younger students.

== Cons ==
Opponents of social promotion argue that it deprives children of a proper education. When socially promoted students reach higher levels of education, they may be unprepared, fail courses, and struggle to make normal progress towards graduation.

They believe social promotion has the following negative impacts:

- Students who must wait until the end of the school year to move on to more advanced studies are denied immediate success.
- Students promoted to a class for which they are unprepared are set up for further failure.
- Students may experience so many easy successes in subsequent years that their study habits deteriorate, or they become frustrated with trivial lessons, leading them to drop out.
- Students may face numerous failures in later years, which frustrates them and increases their dropout risk.
- Their frustration with "baby classes" can lead to classroom disruptions or the humiliation of others.
- Their frustration can cause disruptions that lower the achievement of their classmates.
- It sends the message to all students that hard work is unnecessary for progression.
- It forces the next teacher to handle a mix of prepared and underprepared students, complicating the teaching process.
- It gives parents and students a false sense of the child's academic progress.
- It creates social cliques among same-age peers, which can result in peer pressure, bullying, and drug abuse.
- Eliminating the social promotion system could make the incentives of merit-based promotion more effective early in each student's academic journey.

== Statistics ==
In the United States, grade retention is more common among boys (who lag behind girls in development) and non-white, non-Asian students (who are more likely to be poor). Girls, white, and Asian students are retained at lower rates, by comparison. By the time students reach high school, the retention rate for boys is about ten percentage points higher than for girls. In the early grades, retention rates are similar among white Americans, African Americans, and Hispanic Americans. However, by high school, the retention rate is about 15 percentage points higher for African Americans and Hispanics than for whites. Across all grades, Black students are three times more likely to be retained than white students, while Hispanics are twice as likely.

African American boys are the group most often retained in school. By the ages of 15–17, 50% of African American boys are either below their peers' grade level or have dropped out of school, whereas only 30% of white girls aged 15–17 are below the modal grade of their peers.

There are arguments both for and against social promotion and retention. Social promotion may disadvantage students who have not learned the material, while grade retention can lead to social issues because retained students are older than their peers.

In 1999, educational researcher Robert M. Hauser commented on the New York City school district's plan to end social promotion, claiming that "the great mass of evidence is strongly negative" without providing any of said evidence.

A study of 99,000 Florida students by Jay P. Greene and Marcus A. Winters found that "retained students slightly outperformed socially promoted students in reading in the first year after retention, and these gains increased substantially in the second year. Results were robust across two distinct IV comparisons: an across-year approach comparing students who were essentially separated by the year they happened to have been born, and a regression discontinuity design."

== History ==
With the proliferation of graded schools in the mid-19th century, grade retention, along with mid-term promotions, became common practices. In fact, about a century ago, approximately half of all American students were retained at least once before the age of 13.

Social promotion began to spread in the 1930s, alongside growing concerns about the psychosocial effects of retention. This trend reversed in the 1980s as concerns about declining academic standards increased.

The practice of grade retention in the U.S. has steadily climbed since the 1980s, although local educational agencies may or may not follow this trend. For example, in 1982, New York City schools eliminated social promotions. However, the problems caused by this policy change led the city to reinstate social promotion. In 1999, the city again eliminated social promotion, but it was reinstated after the number of repeaters reached 100,000 by 2004, driving up costs and leading to cutbacks in numerous programs, including those designed to help underachievers.

== Alternatives ==
Apart from social promotion, there is grade retention, in which students repeat a grade if judged to be low performers. Grade retention aims to help students learn and sharpen skills such as organization, management, study skills, literacy, and academics, which are crucial before advancing to the next grade, college, and the labor force.

In the U.S., simple social promotion is not considered an adequate alternative to grade retention. Current theories among academic scholars suggest addressing underperformance with remedial help. Students with specific needs or disabilities require special teaching approaches, equipment, or care within or outside a regular classroom. Since students with intellectual disabilities are handled separately, schools may treat two students with identical achievements differently if one student is low-performing due to a disability while the other is typically developing but also underperforming.

In addition to social promotion, there is merit promotion, which can be implemented through mid-term promotion or a course-based curriculum with a directed acyclic graph of prerequisites similar to college curricula. This alternative allows each student to advance at their own pace and could save school districts money by ending the practice of warehousing "talented and gifted students," enabling these students to graduate early.

== See also ==
- Grade retention
- Grade skipping
