= Grade retention =

Process of having a student repeat an educational course

Grade retention or grade repetition is the process of a student repeating a grade after failing the previous year.

In the United States, grade retention can be used in kindergarten through to third grade; however, students in high school are usually only retained in the specific failed subject. For example, a student can be promoted in a math class but retained in an English class. Most elementary school grades (kindergarten through 5th grade) are taught all subjects in one classroom for the whole day, with exceptions in art and athletics. In these grades, the student who fails or scores below the accepted level in most or all subjects is to be considered for retention. If ultimately retained, the student will then repeat the entire school year's curriculum.

Where it is permitted, grade retention is most common among at-risk students in early elementary school. At-risk students with intellectual disabilities are only intended to be retained when parents and school officials agree to do so. Children who are relatively young in their age cohort are four times more likely to be retained.

Mandatory grade retention of third-grade students who struggle in reading has been a critical part of the Mississippi Miracle, which has seen several low-performing states soar in the national rankings as their students demonstrate increased confidence and capabilities in both reading and mathematics.

== History ==
Different schools have used different approaches throughout history. Grade retention or repetition was essentially meaningless in the one-room schoolhouses of more than a century ago due to limited access to outside standards and the small scale of the school with only a few students in each age group, was conducive to individualized instruction. With the proliferation of larger, graded schools in the middle of the nineteenth century, retention became a common practice and only one century ago, about half of all American students were retained at least once before the age of thirteen.

An alternative to grade retention due to failure is a policy of social promotion, with the idea that staying within their same age group is important. Social promotion is the obligatory advancement of all students regardless of achievements and absences. Social promotion is used more in countries which use tracking to group students according to academic ability. Some academic scholars believe that underperformance must be addressed with intensive remedial help, such as summer school or after-school programs in contrast to failing and retaining the student. Social promotion began to spread in the 1930s with concerns about the psychosocial effects of retention. Social promotion is the promoting of underperforming students under the ideological principle that staying with their same age peers is important to success. This trend reversed in the 1980s as concerns about slipping academic standards rose, and the practice of grade retention in the United States has been climbing steadily ever since. However, in most other countries, retention rates have been decreasing.

The practice of making retention decisions on the basis of the results of a single test, called high-stakes testing, is widely condemned by professional educators and test authors alike. Indeed, Mississippi and other states use data points from multiple tests to determine if a child is to be retained or not.

== Research ==
Academic studies on grade retention are difficult to perform and analyze for several reasons. However, the empirical benefits of grade retention have been clearly demonstrated.

For example, in two similar states in the Southern United States, policies were implemented to address the problem of historically poor reading scores. Both Oklahoma and Mississippi passed similar laws to require grade retention for struggling third-grade readers. However, two years later, Oklahoma passed a new law to no longer require retention; Mississippi held the course and duly implemented mandatory retention. As a result, over the next twelve years, test scores in Mississippi skyrocketed, while Oklahoma's plummeted. While cause and effect cannot be strictly proven, the CEO of ExcelinEd, Patricia Levesque, said that "The difference is Mississippi persisted with the tough-love reform. Oklahoma did not."

Due to the difficulty of constructing studies, there is as of yet no conclusive research proving that grade retention is significantly helpful or harmful. Some existing research has been accused of being methodologically invalid due to the selection bias in the group allocation phase. The three different types of studies that exist or have been proposed may have inherent pitfalls to overcome before the resulting data can be deemed as accurate.

- Studies that compare students who were retained with students who were only considered for retention and were eventually promoted, concluded that social promotion is beneficial to the students. The students that were selected for promotion were often viewed as "better", or "less weak" than the students that were retained, and the "better" students were selected for promotion "because the school believed them to be stronger or more personally mature students", whereas the students that were selected for retention were viewed as "weaker" students and were retained as a result of this.
- Studies that compare retained students with their own prior performance seem to favor grade retention; however, these studies have been accused of being inaccurate because they allegedly do not adequately compensate for personal growth, or stressful changes at home like abusive living conditions, or drastic environmental issues such as living in poverty; all of which will have a definitive impact on the students performance.
- Studies which randomly assign a large pool of borderline students to promotion or retention is the most methodologically sound type of research of this topic. It is imperative that the research is provided with sufficiently detailed information on a large enough scale in order to provide valuable or possibly even definitive information. Although this method can potentially provide the most accurate results, schools and parents are unwilling to have a child's future determined by random assignment, therefore, due to institutional and parental opposition, along with other ethical reasons, these types of studies are not utilized.

=== Non-academic outcomes ===
Retention, when based on subjective factors rather than objective measures of reading ability, is commonly associated with poor social adjustment, disruptive behavior, negative attitudes towards school and low academic attendance; that is to say, these negative factors are inherent among students who will be most likely to be struggling to begin with and therefore be retained." Children who are at risk of retention, therefore, possess a "stronger predictor of delinquency than socioeconomic status, race, or ethnicity," in addition to a higher likelihood of drug and alcohol use and teenage pregnancy. None of these associations or studies, however, came from states that implemented universal mandatory grade retention for struggling readers.

== International ==
=== Australia ===
Australia uses grade retention, although in 2010 the New South Wales Department of Education and Training enacted a policy that states that student retention will no longer be allowed at any school. For example, as of 2010, students will not be repeating eleventh grade or twelfth grade due to the abundance of post school services available to them after they complete twelfth grade, services such as TAFEs or college universities.

=== New Zealand ===
In New Zealand, secondary schools commonly use a system of internal academic streaming in which children of the same age are subdivided on the basis of ability, and lower achieving students (those who would be retained under the North American system) are taught in different classes, and at a different rate, from higher achieving students, but are kept within their own age group. This system has largely rendered grade retention obsolete in all but the most exceptional circumstances.

In most cases where academic streaming is insufficient, additional special services are viewed as being preferential to grade retention, particularly when behavioral challenges are involved.

=== Argentina ===
Argentina contemplates grade retention in all grades except first grade and the last grade of high school. In elementary school, students are retained when they fail one of the basic areas: math, language and social sciences. In secondary school, students are allowed a maximum of two courses failed in order to be promoted. If they fail three or more, they should repeat.

=== East Asia ===
South Korea, Malaysia and North Korea do not practice grade retention. Although grade retention is technically possible in Japan, the practice is largely obsolete.

=== Singapore ===
Singapore practices grade retention in secondary schools if a student is unsuccessful in achieving a satisfactory accumulated percentage grade. The school authorities may also decide that it would be more appropriate for the student to advance to a higher level in a lower stream such as in the cases of "express" and "normal" (academic) students. Grade retention is most common in junior colleges where a promotional criterion is set in place.

=== Turkey ===
In Turkey, grade repetition is done in primary, middle and high schools. Those who fail classes in primary school, those who are constantly absent, and upon the request of their parents, repeat the grade. In middle school, a student whose score is below 50 in any course or below 70 in a Turkish course and who is absent for 20 days or more is subject to repeat grade. Teachers who attend the student's classes meet to decide whether to do this. Those who fail 4 or more courses in high school and have a grade of 50, those who fail 4 or more courses and a grade below 50, and those who are absent for 30 days repeat a grade.

=== Hong Kong ===
Hong Kong practices grade retention in elementary and secondary school if the student obtains a failing grade even after taking a retest.

=== Western Europe ===
Norway and Denmark do not allow grade retention during elementary school and junior high school (1st–10th grade).

In Sweden, a school's headmaster can decide to let a student repeat a grade in primary school (1st–9th grade) with their legal guardian's permission; if there are particularly strong reasons for it, the headmaster can decide on it even without the legal guardian's permission. The headmaster can also allow a student to retake the year of preschool preceding the first year of primary school if their legal guardian requests it and have reasons for it.

In the United Kingdom, a similar streaming system to New Zealand's is used. The exception to this is that students at sixth form (the final two years of secondary education, where there is not usually streaming) may have to repeat a year if they fail a year during this period or complete an access year if they do not get good enough grades at 16.

Austria, Belgium, France, Germany, Italy, Luxembourg, the Netherlands, Portugal, Spain and Switzerland commonly use grade retention.

Greece allows grade retention if a student fails more than five final exams, or five or fewer both in May examinations and in September examinations. A student who has missed more than 114 periods of class can also repeat a grade.

=== North America ===
The United States and Canada both use grade retention.

In the U.S., six-year-old students are most likely to be retained, with another spike around the age of 12. In particular, some large schools have a transitional classroom, sometimes called "kindergarten 2", for six year olds who are not reading ready.

== Common arguments ==
The following are common arguments regarding this practice.

=== Arguments against grade retention ===
Opponents of "no social promotion" policies do not defend social promotion so much as say that retention is even worse. They argue that retention is not a cost-effective response to poor performance when compared to cheaper or more effective interventions, such as additional tutoring and summer school. They point to a wide range of research findings that show no advantage to, or even harm from, retention, and the tendency for gains from retention to see out.

Grade retention is often correlated with several negative long-term impacts, but may or may not cause them.

Harm from retention cited by critics include:

- Lowering the academic self esteem of the student and making them feel as if they were mentally inferior, in turn causing them to give up on their academics. It may also cause them to be the subject of ridicule and bullying by other students.
- Increasing the drop-out rates of retained students over time, although the increased drop out rates of retained students can be explained fully by their poor academic performance prior to retention (children who are retained actually are less likely to drop out than other children with similar academic performance who are not retained).
- Presuming there to be no evidence of long-term academic benefit for retained students (though studies have shown that retained students actually do benefit academically from retention and that this benefit is both substantial and long-lasting).
- Preventing retained students from progressing with their classmates, which may cause a feeling of separation since most students stay with the same group throughout school.
- Keeping children from being in the same age groups.
- Endangering normally progressing younger students in the class which the older student is required to repeat, when the older student is likely to possess a greater level of physical development.
- Decreasing hiring chances. Indeed, grade retention has been shown in research to be correlated with the probability of being invited for a job interview in certain jobs, though when compared to other students who were low performers while at the same grade level, the effect disappears and even reverses.

Critics of retention also note that retention is expensive for school systems: requiring a student to repeat a grade is essentially to add one student for a year to the school system, assuming that the student does not drop out.

The possibility of grade retention has been shown to be a significant source of stress for students. In one study of childhood fears performed in the 1980s, the top three fears for US sixth graders were a parent's death, going blind, and being retained. After two decades of increasing retention practices, a repeat of the study in 2001 found that grade retention was the single greatest fear, higher than loss of a parent or going blind. This change likely reflects the students' correct perception that they were statistically far more likely to repeat the sixth grade than to suffer the death of a parent or the loss of their vision. It remains unproven whether this serves as a benefit or a detriment to their performance in school.

=== Arguments for grade retention ===
Proponents of grade retention argue that passing a child who did not learn the necessary material cheats the child of an education. As a result, when the child gets older, the student will likely fail classes or be forced to attend summer school. They argue, from data, that some children would benefit from an additional year, especially in kindergarten, to mature and develop social and emotional skills. This additional time will assist students with improved academic performance. proponents of grade retention argue that failing to retain struggling students has the following negative impacts:

- Students who are promoted cannot do the work in the next grade, and so are being set up for further failure.
- Students will have many failures in the high school years, which will most likely lead to dropping out.
- It sends the message to all students that they can get by without working hard.
- It forces teachers to deal with under prepared students while trying to teach the prepared.
- It gives parents a false sense of their children's progress.
- It will not get them the help they need.

== See also ==
- Super senior
