= Hiroyuki (artist) =

Japanese manga artist

Hiroyuki (ヒロユキ; born April 23, 1982) is a Japanese manga artist from Ishikawa Prefecture, Japan. He is notable for the creation of the four-panel comic strip manga Dōjin Work which is the first of his works to be adapted into an anime television series. He also created the four-panel manga series The Comic Artist and His Assistants, which was serialized from 2008 to 2012, with a sequel serialized from August 2013, and adapted into an anime television series which aired in 2014. Hiroyuki has also created dōjinshi based on the Type-Moon visual novels Tsukihime and Fate/stay night. His older sister, Kōji Megumi (恵 広史, Megumi Kōji), is also a manga artist.

== Works ==
- Dōjin Work (ドージンワーク) (2004–2007)
- The Comic Artist and His Assistants (マンガ家さんとアシスタントさんと) (2008–2012, 2013–2014)
- Super Oresama Love Story (スーパー俺様ラブストーリー) (2009)
- Aho-Girl (アホガール) (2012–2017)
- Girlfriend, Girlfriend (カノジョも彼女) (2020–2023)
- A Manga Artist Who Has Had Four Works Animated Went into Debt for 50 Million Yen as a Result of Being Addicted to Wristwatches (アニメ化4作品のマンガ家が腕時計にハマった結果5000万円の借金をつくった話) (2023)
- Jackpot Girls (ドリーム☆ジャンボ☆ガール) (2025–present)
