= Girlfriend, Girlfriend =

Japanese manga series

- First tankōbon volume cover, featuring Saki Saki

カノジョも彼女 (Kanojo mo Kanojo)
- Genre: Harem; Romantic comedy
- Manga
- Written by: Hiroyuki
- Published by: Kodansha
- English publisher: NA: Kodansha USA
- Imprint: Shōnen Magazine Comics
- Magazine: Weekly Shōnen Magazine
- Original run: March 4, 2020 – May 24, 2023
- Volumes: 16
- Anime television series
- Directed by: Satoshi Kuwabara (S1); Takatoshi Suzuki (S2)
- Produced by: List: Season 1: Hiroyuki Aoi; Kentarou Hattori; Masahiro Hibi; Souichirou Naitou; Sumio Udagawa; Shintarou Yoshitake; Season 2: Mika Sugimoto; Kou Tachibana; Hiroaki Yamazaki; Daisuke Aramaki; Kazuo Tsutsui; Toyoshige Miyashita
- Written by: Keiichirō Ōchi; Kazuhiko Inukai (S2)
- Music by: Miki Sakurai; Tatsuhiko Saiki; Sayaka Aoki (S1); Kanade Sakuma (S2); Junko Nakajima (S2)
- Studio: Tezuka Productions (S1); SynergySP (S2)
- Licensed by: Crunchyroll: SA/SEA: Muse Communication
- Original network: MBS, TBS, BS-TBS, AT-X
- Original run: July 3, 2021 – December 23, 2023
- Episodes: 24
- icon

Girlfriend, Girlfriend (Japanese: カノジョも彼女, Hepburn: Kanojo mo Kanojo; lit. 'She Is My Girlfriend Too'), also known as KanoKano (カノかの) for short, is a Japanese romantic comedy manga series written and illustrated by Hiroyuki. It was serialized in Kodansha's shōnen manga magazine Weekly Shōnen Magazine from March 2020 to May 2023, with its chapters collected in sixteen tankōbon volumes. The series focuses on a high school student who engages in a polyamorous relationship with his childhood friend and another girl who confessed her feelings for him.

An anime television series adaptation, produced by Tezuka Productions, aired from July to September 2021 on the Animeism programming block. A second season, produced by SynergySP, aired from October to December 2023.

== Plot ==
Naoya Mukai is a high school student who has recently begun dating his childhood friend Saki Saki. One day, another classmate of his named Nagisa Minase, who is in love with him, decides to confess her feelings to him. Initially, Naoya was not going to date Nagisa, but after some initial hesitation, he eventually accepts her request to be her boyfriend if Saki agrees. Naoya decides that he will have both Saki and Nagisa as girlfriends at the same time.

As Naoya currently lives alone due to his parents living elsewhere for work, Saki and Nagisa decide to live with him. The series follows their daily school life, as Naoya, Saki, and Nagisa experience difficulties and challenges in maintaining their non-monogamous relationship, which is only worsened by the arrival of Rika Hoshizaki, whose extreme obsession of Naoya constantly terrifies him. Before long, another girl named Shino Kiryū also gets involved as she too has unrequited feelings for Naoya.

== Characters ==
Naoya Mukai (向井 直也, Mukai Naoya)
Voiced by: Junya Enoki (Japanese); Kevin D. Thelwell (English)
Naoya is Saki's childhood friend. He confessed to her every month until she accepted, but also agrees to take Nagisa as a girlfriend as well as he found her to be cute, even though he initially did not like her in a romantic way. He is an only child; as such, he hopes to have a girlfriend who has siblings. Shino becomes his third girlfriend after Saki agrees to let Naoya date her as well. Rika on the other hand is given a challenge to win over Naoya before a deadline, or else she will have to stop trying. Rika finally becomes his fourth girlfriend when she agrees to join his harem.
Saki Saki (佐木 咲)
Voiced by: Ayana Taketatsu (PV), Ayane Sakura (anime) (Japanese); Brittany Lauda (English)
Naoya's childhood friend and first girlfriend. She shares a first and last name as her parents thought such a name would be cute. (Note: Her full name contains the same reading but not the same kanji in writing.) While initially not romantically interested in Naoya and constantly rejecting him every month, she eventually accepts and starts to genuinely fall in love with him. She has a complex about her small chest, especially when compared to Nagisa. Although cheerful and kind, she is very hot-tempered and has a tendency to be violent and aggressive, even towards Naoya. She is a member of their school's basketball club.
Nagisa Minase (水瀬 渚, Minase Nagisa)
Voiced by: Ayane Sakura (PV), Azumi Waki (anime) (Japanese); Madeleine Morris (Note: Kelsey Maher filled in for Morris as Nagisa in episode 16.) (English)
A classmate of Naoya, who becomes his second girlfriend after confessing to him. She was previously a shy girl who felt that she was not good at anything, then fell in love with Naoya as he inspired her to pursue skills that she was good at. Naoya initially did not like her at all and rejected her on the spot, but once she finally proved herself to him, he realized he is in love with her as well and accepts her alongside Saki.
Rika Hoshizaki (星崎 理香, Hoshizaki Rika)
Voiced by: Ayana Taketatsu (anime) (Japanese); Megan Shipman (Note: Bryn Apprill filled in for Shipman as Rika in episode 15 while the latter was on maternity leave.) (English)
A schoolmate of Naoya. She is secretly a popular vlogger who goes by the online alias Milika (ミリカ, Mirika). She becomes extremely obsessed with Naoya, and desperately wants to be his third girlfriend, going as far as stalking him and his girlfriends, camping outside his house to get his attention, as well as nearly raping him against his will. Her obsession with him slowly takes a toll on her sanity, which makes the group even more terrified of her. Despite this, Naoya constantly rejects her, since he has no romantic feelings for her at all, and often tends to stay away from her out of fear. In spite of this, she eventually becomes a part of the group, but it is only so she can be given a chance to make Naoya fall in love with him before the end of the year or else she will have to leave him alone for good.
Shino Kiryū (桐生 紫乃, Kiryū Shino)
Voiced by: Rie Takahashi (anime) (Japanese); Elizabeth Maxwell (Note: Corey Pettit filled in for Maxwell as Shino in episodes 21 and 22.) (English)
Saki's best friend and classmate who comes from a rich family. She is at the top of their class academically. She discovers Naoya's romantic arrangement with Saki and Nagisa and she disapproves of it. It is later revealed that she is also secretly in love with Naoya and that her attempts to end Saki's relationship with him are an attempt to get over her feelings for him. After this is discovered, she continues to stay with the group until either Saki tells Shino to give up or Naoya accepts her. Naoya eventually confesses his love for her, and with Saki's blessing, she officially becomes his third girlfriend.
Mr. Hoshizaki (ミリカ父, Mirika Chichi)
Voiced by: Tomokazu Seki^{Ep. 6 credits} (Japanese); Ben Phillips (English)
Rika and Risa's father.
Risa Hoshizaki (星崎 理沙, Hoshizaki Risa)
Voiced by: Aoi Koga (Japanese); Rachel Thompson (English)
Rika's younger sister.

== Production ==
Girlfriend, Girlfriend is based on Seiseidōdō, Futamata-suru Hanashi (正々堂々、二股する話, "A Story of Two-timing but Fair and Square"), which Hiroyuki had uploaded on Twitter and later published in Comiket 86 in August 2019.

== Media ==
=== Manga ===
Written and illustrated by Hiroyuki, Girlfriend, Girlfriend was serialized in Kodansha's shōnen manga magazine Weekly Shōnen Magazine from March 4, 2020, to May 24, 2023. Kodansha collected its chapters in 16 tankōbon volumes, released from June 17, 2020, to July 14, 2023. A commercial to promote the series, starring Ayana Taketatsu and Ayane Sakura, was released on October 23, 2020.

In February 2021, Kodansha USA announced the English digital release of the series in North America and the first volume was released on April 6, 2021. In November 2025, Kodansha USA announced that it would release the series in print in a 2-in-1 volume omnibus edition, set to start on December 9 of the same year.

=== Anime ===
In November 2020, the 51st issue of Weekly Shōnen Magazine announced that the series would receive an anime television series adaptation. Tezuka Productions animated the series, with Satoshi Kuwabara as director, Keiichirō Ōchi as scriptwriter, and Akiko Toyoda designing the characters. Miki Sakurai, Tatsuhiko Saiki, and Sayaka Aoki composed the series' music. It aired from July 3 to September 18, 2021, on the Animeism programming block on MBS, TBS, and BS-TBS, as well as AT-X. (Note: MBS listed the series premiere at 26:25 on July 2, 2021, which is July 3 at 2:25 a.m.) Necry Talkie performed the series' opening theme song "Fuzaketenai ze" (ふざけてないぜ), while Momo Asakura performed the series' ending theme song "Pinky Hook" (ピンキーフック, Pinkī Fukku). Crunchyroll streamed the series outside of Asia. Muse Communication licensed the series in South and Southeast Asia, and streamed it on its YouTube channel and iQIYI.

On September 16, 2022, it was announced that the anime would be receiving a second season. It was produced by SynergySP, with Takatoshi Suzuki serving as the director, Kazuhiko Inukai serving as scriptwriter along with Ōchi, Shouko Hagiwara serving as the character designer, and Kanade Sakuma and Junko Nakajima composing the music along with Sakurai and Saiki. The second season aired from October 7 to December 23, 2023. (Note: MBS listed the season premiere at 26:23 on October 6, 2023, which is October 7 at 2:23 a.m.) Hikari Kodama performed the opening theme song "Dramatic ni Koi Shitai" (ドラマチックに恋したい), while ClariS performed the ending theme song "Forira" (ふぉりら).
