= History of education in Kentucky =

History of education in Kentucky covers education at all levels from the late 18th century to the early 21st century. The frontier state was slow to build an educational system. In K–12 and higher education, Kentucky consistently has ranked toward the bottom of national rankings in terms of funding, literacy levels, and student performance. Inside the state the Appalachian region always lagged. The Bluegrass area, however, built a strong reputation in higher education.

== Elementary education ==
Education was a private family matter in early Kentucky. There was no effort at the state or local level to start public schools. Wealthy families had their children tutored at home or at small local "academies" that charged tuition. Teachers were ill-prepared and focused on the 3 Rs—reading, writing and simple arithmetic.

A few private schools pre-dating Kentucky's statehood, such as the Salem Academy in Bardstown starting in 1794. Plans were put forward by 1800 but never put in operation. State funds that were allocated were diverted to other uses. Some towns set up charity schools for paupers but they had a negative stigma attached. The full-fledged development of public education in the state did not materialize until after 1865.

=== 19th century ===
There were a number of weaknesses in schools in Kentucky before 1865. During the Civil War most schools were disrupted or closed.

Education was not free or compulsory in Kentucky until the late 19th century. Most children, especially from poor or rural families, did not have the opportunity to attend school. Conditions were especially negative in the mountain districts. A few places did operate small charity schools for the poor. Public high schools were rare before the late 19th century. The more expensive private academies often covered a year or two beyond the 8th grade.

Teachers were poorly qualified. Most had graduated from 8th grade and take a year or two additional schooling in "normal school" programs. For women it was usually a brief interlude before marriage. For men it was a low status, low paying job with little future. The best teachers were often Presbyterian or Methodist ministers who taught a school attached to their church. They were already paid by their congregations and enjoyed high social status.

The curriculum in Kentucky schools in the early 19th century was very limited. Most students only learned basic reading, writing, and arithmetic. There was little focus on higher-order thinking skills or creativity. The children played during outdoor recess but there were no organized sports or extra-curricular activities.

Most schools operated in decrepit buildings with few textbooks or blackboards. The one teacher simultaneously handled all the grades in an overcrowded and uncomfortable room. There were seldom enough books or other materials.

Private academies operated on a tuition basis in towns. They provided a better quality education through grade 8, and sometimes added additional years. Upscale academies became local finishing schools for girls, with an emphasis on social skills, music, dancing and embroidery.

According to Philip C. Kimball, under the leadership of Thomas Noble and the federal government's Freedmen's Bureau, a school system for Kentucky Blacks was created in the late 1860s. They persevered against the hostility of scattered white mobs, the inadequate training of some teachers, and minimal local or state tax support. With strong support from the black community and Northern churches, the new system grew rapidly in 1868 and 1869 to reach parity with the established white school system. Although federal funding ended in 1870, black schools multiplied until full state funding was assured in 1882.

Down to the 1940s, the state and local governments gave far less money to all-black public schools compared to the favored white public schools. (Apart from Berea, there were no racially integrated schools). However many private schools for Blacks were funded by Northern philanthropy well into the 20th century. Support came from the American Missionary Association; the Peabody Education Fund; the Jeanes Fund (also known as the Negro Rural School Fund); the Slater Fund; the Rosenwald Fund; the Southern Education Foundation; and the General Education Board, which was massively funded by the Rockefeller family.

=== 20th century ===
In Lexington, the city school superintendent Massillon Alexander Cassidy implemented Progressive Era reforms. He focused on upgrading the buildings and setting up teacher-training. He emphasized the need to improve literacy rates and expand access to public schooling. Cassidy's own philosophy stressed the use of science, business, and expertise. He also had a paternalistic attitude toward blacks, who were in segregated public schools.

The Kentucky Education Association is a powerful lobbying group dedicated to higher funding, safer buildings, better study materials, smaller classes, and the empowerment of teachers, school employees and parents.

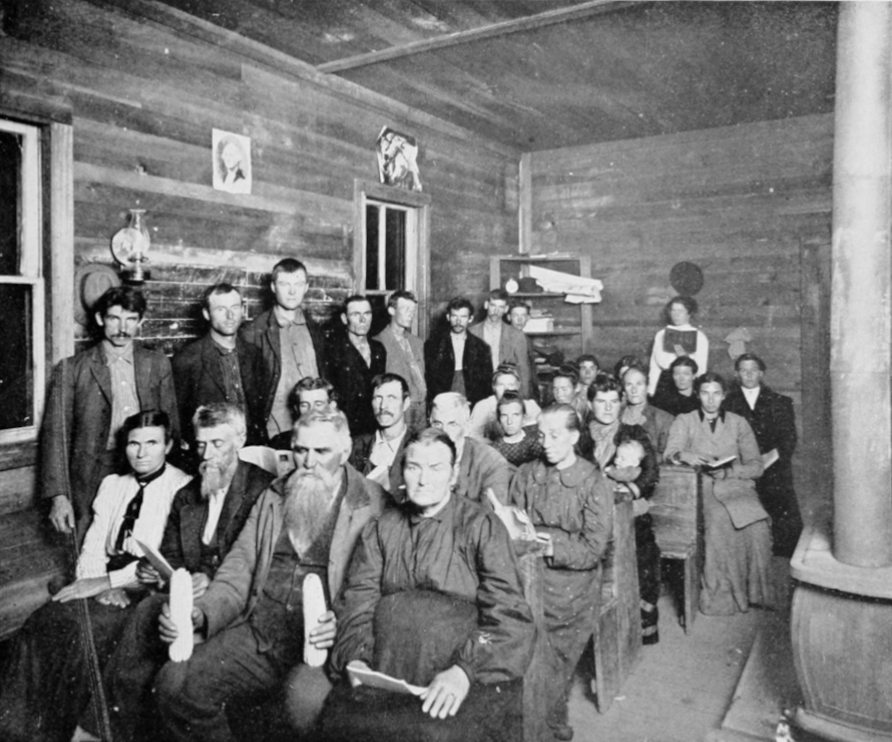
A "moonlight school"; night classes for illiterate adults in local school in mountains, c. 1916

=== The mountain districts ===
The mountain districts had very low levels of literacy until well into the 20th century. Schools were scarce and offered only a few months of classes for a few years. The problem of adult illiteracy led to the introduction of adult literacy classes, typified by "Moonlight Schools" introduced by Cora Wilson Stewart in Rowan County 1911. In 1914, the state extended moonlight schools to all counties. In the following two years, 40,000 adults were taught to read and write.

== Higher education ==
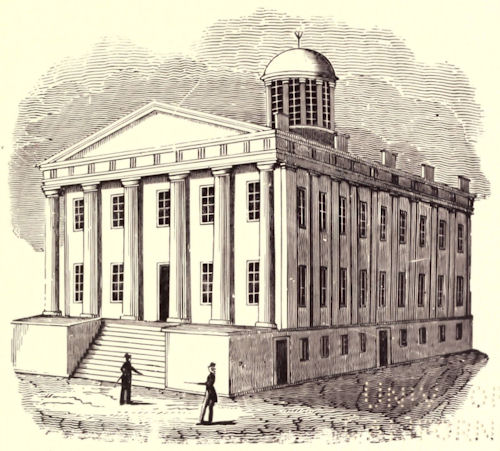
Medical Hall at Transylvania University in Lexington; it burned down in 1863.

Wealthy families sent their sons east to established colleges. Professional training in law and medicine was gained by young men working as aides for established mentors.

=== Transylvania ===
Transylvania Seminary was established by Presbyterians in 1780 to train ministers. By 1799, the small institution was renamed Transylvania University. Horace Holley (1781–1827), was a leading New England minister who served as president from 1818 to 1827. Holley made Transylvania the outstanding institution of higher learning west of the Alleghenies. He reorganized it as a four-year institution, and founded the medical school and the law school. Holley attracted eminently qualified faculty; by 1825, the medical school was ranked second in the country. The university's enrollment quadrupled, and it graduated 650 men (compared to 60 graduates before 1818). Henry Clay taught law and was a member of Transylvania's Board from 1807 to 1852. Famous alumni included Stephen F. Austin, founder of Texas; Jefferson Davis, President of the Confederate States of America; Richard Mentor Johnson, vice president under Martin Van Buren; John C. Breckinridge, vice-president under James Buchanan; and Samuel Freeman Miller, U.S. Supreme Court Justice.

Following the Civil War, Kentucky University was hit by a major fire, and both it and Transylvania University were left in dire financial condition. In 1865, both institutions merged, using Transylvania's campus in Lexington while perpetuating the Kentucky University name.

=== Berea ===
Berea College was founded in Berea, Kentucky, in 1855 by John Gregg Fee as a one-room school for teenagers from the mountain districts. In 1869 it expanded into college level work. It became the first important higher education institution in the South to be coeducational and racially integrated, admitting both black and white students in a fully integrated curriculum. From 1865 to 1892, Berea College enrolled an equal number of black and white students, making it a unique integrated college in the South. However, Berea faced intense opposition from segregationists. The Day Law in 1904 prohibited racial mixing forcing Berea students to be all white until it reintegrated in 1950. In 1906, the Labor Program was set up, requiring every student to work as part of their educational experience. A notable alumnus is Carter G. Woodson, who is known as the "Father of Black History."

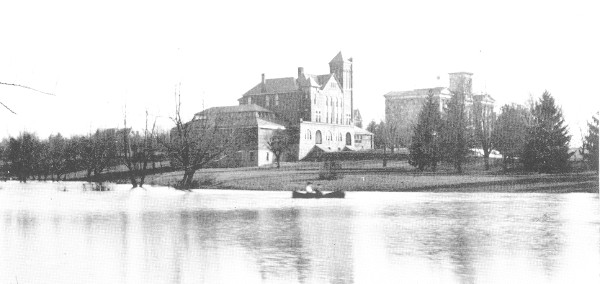
The early campus: Barker Hall in the center, the Main Building to the right, and a lake in the foreground where the Student Center was later built

=== University of Kentucky ===
John Bryan Bowman was appointed head of the new "Agricultural and Mechanical College of Kentucky" (called "A&M"), a department of Kentucky University. It received federal support through the Morrill Land-Grant Act in 1865. In 1866 it opened with 190 students and 10 professors, on the campus at Ashland, The Henry Clay Estate. In 1869 James Kennedy Patterson replaced Bowman and the first degree was awarded. In 1876, the university began to offer master's degree programs. In 1878 A&M separated from Kentucky University, which reverted to its original name Transylvania University. For the new school, Lexington donated a 52-acre (210,000 m^{2}) park and fair ground, which became the core of UK's present campus. A&M was initially a male-only institution, but began to admit women in 1880.

In 1892, the official colors of the university, royal blue and white, were adopted. An earlier color set, blue and light yellow, was adopted earlier at a Kentucky-Centre College football game on December 19, 1891. The particular hue of blue was determined from a necktie, which was used to demonstrate the color of royal blue.

On February 15, 1882, Administration Building was the first building of three to be completed on the present campus. Three years later, the college formed the Agricultural Experiment Station, which researches issues relating to agribusiness, food processing, nutrition, water and soil resources and the environment. This was followed up by the creation of the university's Agricultural Extension Service in 1910, which was one of the first in the United States. The extension service became a model of the federally mandated programs that were required beginning in 1914.

== Kentucky Education Reform Act ==
Legislation was passed in 1990 and was known as the Kentucky Education Reform Act (KERA). This act instituted six basic initiatives, some of the most important being a focus on core subjects, community service, and self-sufficiency. Kentucky education has seen improvements in terms of equalizing funding among various schools, but still has a long way to go in becoming nationally competitive in its educational outcomes and standardized test scores.

2024 Kentucky Amendment 2, a proposal to allow state funding of private schools, failed to pass in November 2024.

== See also ==
- Education in Kentucky
  - Kentucky Department of Education, a branch of state government
- Kentucky Education Association
- List of school districts in Kentucky
  - List of middle schools in Kentucky
  - List of high schools in Kentucky
- List of colleges and universities in Kentucky
  - University of Kentucky
  - Eastern Kentucky University
  - University of Louisville
  - Western Kentucky University
