= Jackson Davis (education official) =

- Born: September 25, 1882; Cumberland County, Virginia
- Died: April 15, 1947 (aged 64); Cartersville, Virginia
- Occupations: Principal, education official, and education reformer
- Known for: Assisted in the creation of the United Negro College Fund
- Board member of: YMCA of Roanoke (1903-1904); Jeanes Foundation (1908); General Education Board (1915-1946)
- Spouse: Corinne Mansfield (m. 1911; died 1941)
- Children: 2

Academic background
- Education: Columbia University

Academic work
- Era: Jim Crow
- Institutions: Williamsburg Public Schools (1902-1904); Smyth County Public Schools (1904-1905); Henrico County Public Schools (1905-1908); Virginia State Department of Education (1910-1915)

Jackson Davis (September 25, 1882 – April 15, 1947) was a principal, education official, and education reformer from Virginia during the Jim Crow era of segregation. He was involved in supervising education programs for African Americans and promoted well maintained manual labor colleges for them. He did not express any opposition to segregation. He took photographs and documented conditions at some of the schools serving African Americans and Native Americans in the southern United States, especially in rural areas. He was also involved with philanthropic organizations, traveled to Africa twice, and was part of a colonization society.

By attracting funds from the Jeanes Foundation, Davis found support for manual labor colleges for African Americans and became the first Jeanes Supervising Industrial Teacher. Later, starting in 1909, Davis first became an inspector for the Virginia State Board of Education and then, until 1915, the state agent for Negro Rural Schools. He advocated for their schools to be well maintained as at Virginia Estelle Randolph's school. He did not oppose segregation. From 1915 to 1929 he worked as a field agent for the General Education Board. From 1929 onward, he rose from the position of assistant director (1929) to director (1946). In addition, Davis was a trustee and, from 1946, the president of the Phelps Stokes Fund.

He helped develop the Jeanes Foundation's Supervising Teacher Program, leadership of the General Education Board in New York City, (later part of the Rockefeller Foundation), and participation in the planning which led to the formation of the United Negro College Fund which helps support students attending historically black colleges and universities in the United States. The Jackson Davis Elementary School in Henrico County, Virginia is named after Davis.

The Jackson Davis Collection of over 5,000 photographs and numerous manuscripts and documents housed at the University of Virginia is one of the more comprehensive archives available for research on the topic of minority education during the Jim Crow era in the southern United States.

== Youth, education ==
Jackson T. Davis was born on September 25, 1882, in Cumberland County, Virginia to William Anderson Davis and Sally Wyatt (née Guy) Davis. He was educated in Richmond City Public Schools, Richmond, and attended the College of William and Mary in Williamsburg, where he graduated in the Class of 1902 with a Bachelor of Arts (B.A.) degree. He earned his Master of Arts (M.A.) degree from Columbia University in 1908.

Honorary Doctor of Law (LL.D.) degrees were conferred upon him by the University of Richmond in 1930 and the College of William and Mary in 1931.

== Career ==
For 15 years Davis served in various education positions in Virginia, mostly with the public schools. He then went to work with the New York City-based General Education Board, where for the next 30 years he focused on rural and African American education in the southern United States and became an internationally known leader in his field.

=== Virginia public schools ===
Upon graduating from the College of William and Mary in 1902, he first became the principal of the public schools of Williamsburg, Virginia, a small city where William and Mary is located. From 1903 to 1904, he was assistant secretary of the YMCA in the City of Roanoke. He was next principal of the Smyth County Public Schools in the incorporated town of Marion from 1904 to 1905.

In 1905, Jackson Davis was named Division Superintendent of Henrico County Public Schools, a school division in the large county which adjoins Richmond, where he served for five years. In 1908, he became professionally involved with another Virginian, Virginia Estelle Randolph, who was also to become well known in African-American education as they led Henrico County's role in beginning the work of the Jeanes Foundation.

Anna T. Jeanes was a wealthy Quaker who lived in Philadelphia. She had outlived her other family members. She has been described as "a remarkable woman with a vision for Christian peace which she used her fortune to promote." As she neared the end of her life, she was approached by Dr. Booker T. Washington and others to see if she would help fund their efforts. If she could, she wanted to help "the little country schools", and set aside $1 million from her family inheritance to establish a fund called the Jeanes Foundation. The purpose was to maintain and assist rural schools for African Americans in the South. The organization provided funds to employ supervisors of teachers who were dedicated to upgrading vocational training programs for teachers of black students.

As the overseer of twenty three elementary schools in Henrico County, Virginia Randolph worked with Davis to develop the first in-service training program for black teachers and worked on improving the curriculum of the schools. With the freedom to design her own agenda, she shaped industrial work and community self-help programs to meet specific needs of schools. She chronicled her progress by becoming the author of the Henrico Plan which became a reference book for southern schools receiving assistance from the Jeanes Foundation, which later became known as the Negro Rural School Fund. The teachers were educated to use the procedures developed by Miss Randolph, Jackson Davis and others in normal schools such as at what is now Hampton University, Tuskegee University, and many other historically black colleges and universities (HBCUs).

Dr. James H. Dillard, president of the Jeanes Foundation, credited Jackson Davis and Virginia Randolph as the inventors of the real Jeanes plan. Their work together with the Jeanes Foundation development project helped both Davis and Randolph to commit the rest of their lives to rural and African American education.

In 1910, Jackson Davis was named State Agent for African-American rural schools for the Virginia State Department of Education. Serving from 1910 to 1915, during this time, he traveled extensively around Virginia, visiting communities, meeting teachers and pupils, and inspecting facilities. His surviving collection of photographs provided vivid graphical impact to accompany his reports from this period of the racially-segregated schools in Virginia.

=== General Education Board ===
In 1915, Davis became affiliated with the General Education Board as a field agent. After two years, he was promoted to be the board's general field agent at headquarters in New York City. In 1929, he was named assistant director. He became associate director in 1933 and vice-president and director in 1946.

For 30 years, Davis specialized in education and interracial problems in both the Southern United States, and in Africa, notably Belgian Congo and Liberia. In 1935 he went to Africa as a Carnegie visitor, and in 1944 went again as head of a group sent by the Foreign Missions Conference of North America, the British Conference of Missions, and the Phelps-Stokes Fund.

Dr. Davis was also a trustee of the Phelps-Stokes Fund, an organization devoted to African-American education and race relations both in America and in Africa. He became vice-president of the fund in 1940, and succeeded Anson Phelps Stokes as president in 1946.

In 1943, Dr. Davis was involved with the planning that led to creation of the United Negro College Fund (UNCF), stating "an effort of this kind would provide the form of expression which is needed to promote better interracial relations and that there are many people who would find this the most desirable way possible to express their good will toward the Negro." Early supporters of the UNCF included President Franklin Delano Roosevelt and John D. Rockefeller Jr.

He was also a frequent contributor to educational journals. In 1946, he co-authored Africa Advancing: A Study of Rural Education and Agriculture in West Africa and the Belgian Congo, with Margaret Wrong and Thomas M. Campbell. The book provided the results of an earlier survey (made in 1944).

== Photography ==
In 1915, Davis was appointed as the field agent for the General Education Board, an NGO set up by John D. Rockefeller. In this role, he documented the conditions, often miserable, in rural African American schools in a series of 6,000 photographs.

He photographed George Perley Phenix and a Monacan man splitting wood.

He photographed:

- Amherst Indian School in Falling Rock, Amherst County, Virginia
- Bear Mountain Indian Mission School in Amherst County
- Caroline County Training School
- Elizabeth City State Normal School
- Maynesville Industrial and Educational Institute

The University of Virginia has nine of his photographs in its "Virginia Indian Archive".

== Books ==
- Africa Advancing: A Study of Rural Education and Agriculture in West Africa and the Belgian Congo, co-authored with Thomas Monroe Campbell and Margaret Wrong (1945)

== Family ==
On May 19, 1911, Davis married Corinne Mansfield in Bluffton, Georgia. They had two daughters, Helen Mansfield Davis (who married John Phillip Lynch Jr.) and Ruth Elizabeth Davis (who married Charles Rolfe Langhorne). His wife of 30 years predeceased him in 1941.

== Death and legacy ==
Dr. Davis died suddenly at his home in Cartersville, Virginia on April 15, 1947. In Henrico County, Virginia, Jackson Davis Elementary School, dedicated in 1962, was named for him.

The Jackson Davis Collection of over 5,000 photographs and numerous manuscripts and documents was given to the Special Collections Department of the University of Virginia by his daughters and additional papers were late added by his granddaughters. The collection is located in the Albert and Shirley Small Special Collections Library at the University of Virginia in Charlottesville, Virginia.

== See also ==
- Lewis Hine, photographer and social reformer
