= Southern Education Board =

Executive branch of the Conference for Education in the South (1901–1914)

The Southern Education Board was established in 1901 as the executive branch of the Conference for Education in the South. The Conference emerged from meetings in Capon Springs, West Virginia, in 1898–1900. Its mission was promoting public education in the South as well as modern agricultural methods and rural community development. It closed in 1914.

The director was Edgar Gardner Murphy, an Episcopal minister from Montgomery, Alabama. Leading Board members included Robert Curtis Ogden (1836–1913), president; Charles D. McIver (1860–1908), secretary; George Foster Peabody (1852–1938), treasurer; Edwin A. Alderman (1861–1931); William H. Baldwin (1863–1905); Wallace Buttrick (1853–1926); J.L.M. Curry (1825–1903); Charles W. Dabney (1855–1945); George Sherwood Dickerman (1843–1937); Hollis B. Frissell (1851–1917); H.H. Hanna; Walter Hines Page (1855–1918); and Albert Shaw (1857–1947). It was related to a series of philanthropic organizations directed at the South, including the Southern Conference for Education and Industry, the Southern Educational Association, and the Southern Education Society.

Its records are held by the Wilson Library at the University of North Carolina at Chapel Hill.

== See also ==
- Edgar Gardner Murphy
- History of education in the Southern United States
