= Virginia Randolph Cottage =

Historic school building in Virginia, United States

- U.S. National Register of Historic Places
- U.S. National Historic Landmark
- Virginia Landmarks Register
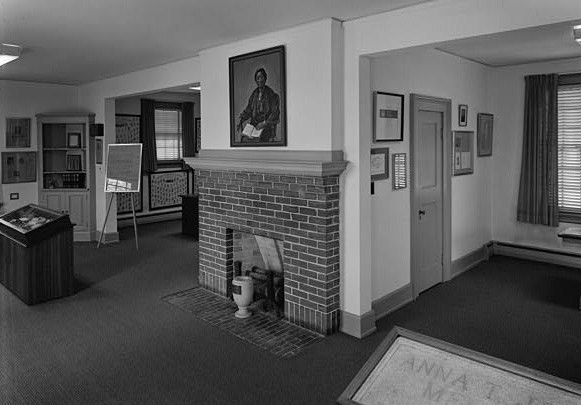
- c. 1984 HABS photo

- Location within Virginia Location within the United States
- Location: 2200 Mountain Rd., Glen Allen, Virginia
- Coordinates: 37°39′39″N 77°28′56″W
- Built: 1937
- NRHP reference No.: 74002126
- VLR No.: 043-0043

Significant dates
- Added to NRHP: December 2, 1974
- Designated NHL: December 2, 1974
- Designated VLR: March 18, 1975

The Virginia Randolph Cottage, now the Virginia E. Randolph Museum, is a museum at 2200 Mountain Road in Glen Allen, Virginia. The museum is dedicated to the history of Virginia E. Randolph (1874–1958), an African-American vocational educator in the area for 55 years. The building, built in 1937 and housing Randolph's home economics classrooms, was declared a National Historic Landmark in 1974 in recognition of her legacy as a trainer of vocational teachers; her remains are interred on the grounds.

== Description and history ==
The Virginia Randolph Museum is located east of Glen Allen, on the north side of Mountain Road, just east of the main buildings of the Academy at Virginia Randolph, part of the Henrico County public schools. The museum building is a single-story brick house, with a gabled roof pierced by three dormers. It is not architecturally distinctive, and its interior has been partitioned to better serve its present purpose as a museum. It was built in 1937 with federal funding assistance.

Virginia E. Randolph was born to former slaves, and made her early career as an educator. In 1908 she was chosen by the Henrico County supervisor to develop a model program of training and supervision for vocational teachers. Under the auspices of the Jeanes Foundation, the methods and plans developed by Virginia Randolph in Henrico County eventually achieved internationally widespread adoption.

Randolph also continued to teach in the Henrico County schools until her retirement in 1949. The home economics building, where she is said to have had an office, continued to be used as a teaching facility until 1969-70, and was then converted by the county into a museum in Randolph's honor. Randolph is buried in a grave nearby.

== See also ==
- List of National Historic Landmarks in Virginia
- National Register of Historic Places listings in Henrico County, Virginia
