= Edgar Murphy =

Edgar Murphy may refer to:

- Edgar Gardner Murphy (1869–1913), American clergyman and author
- Edgar O. Murphy (1878–1959), mayor of Farmingdale, New Jersey
