= James H. Dillard House =

Historic house in Louisiana, United States

- James H. Dillard Home
- U.S. National Register of Historic Places
- U.S. National Historic Landmark
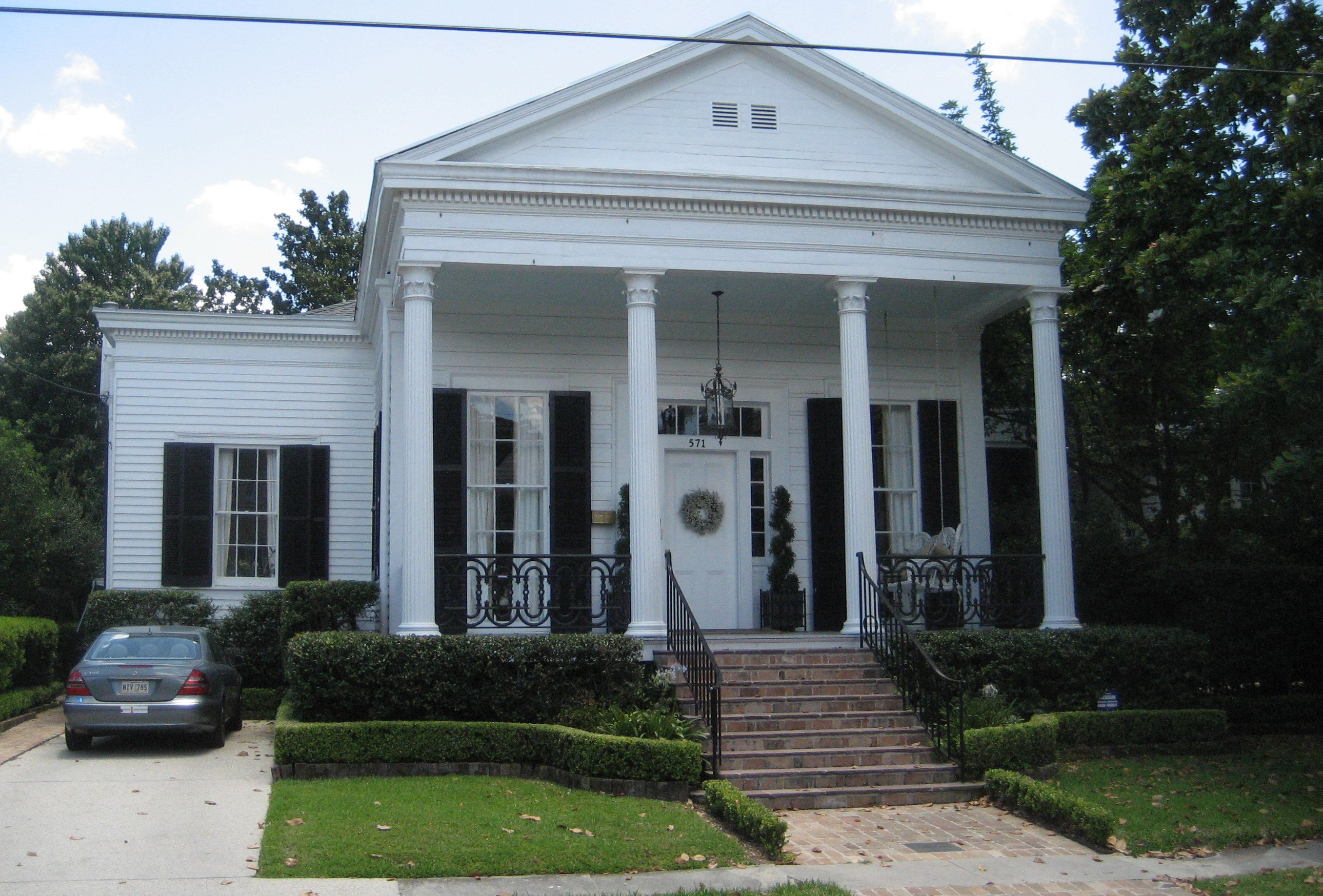

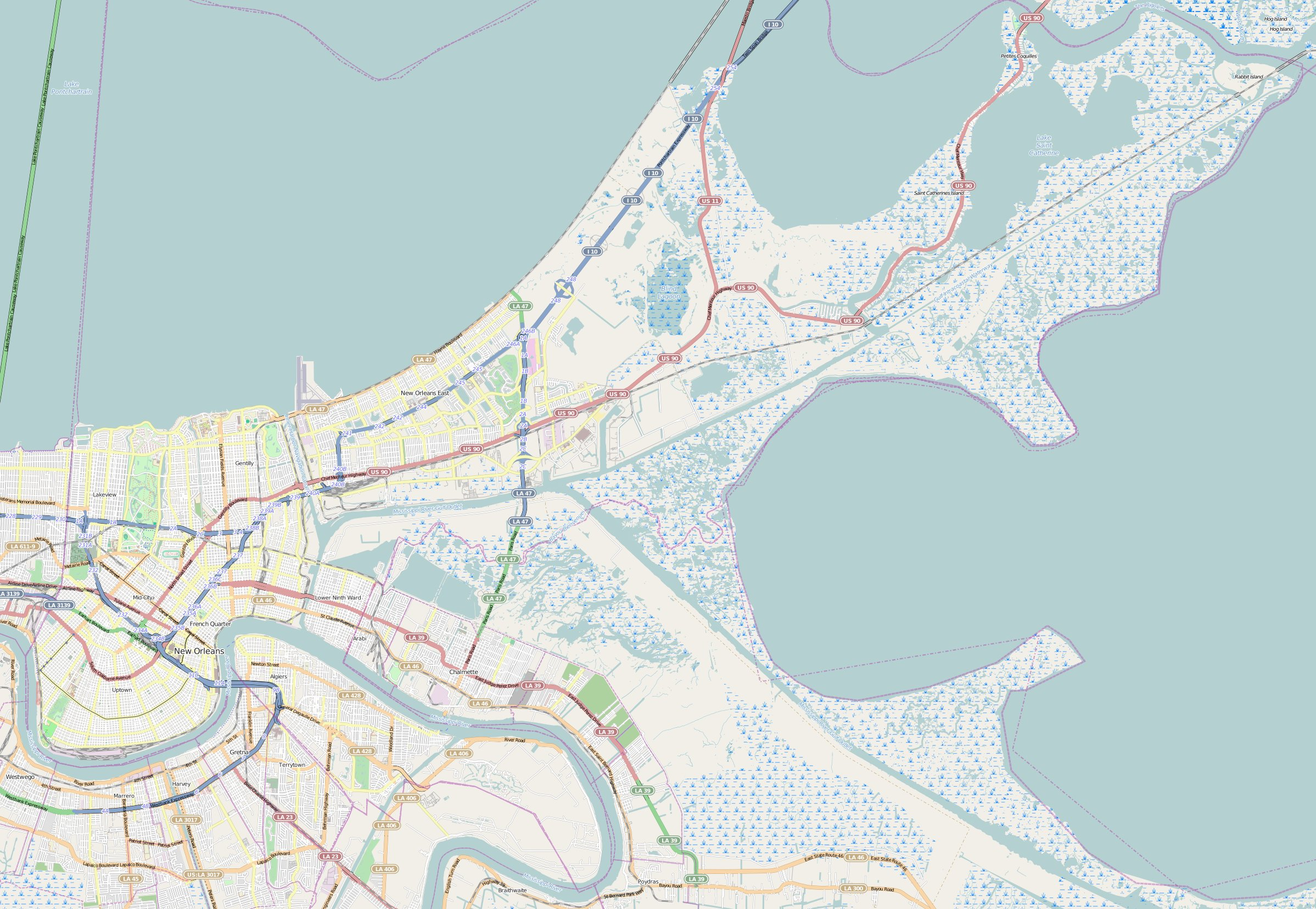
- Location within New Orleans Location within Louisiana Location within the United States
- Location: 571 Audubon Street, New Orleans, Louisiana
- Coordinates: 29°56′6.54″N 90°7′34.16″W
- Built: 1894
- NRHP reference No.: 74000929

Significant dates
- Added to NRHP: December 2, 1974
- Designated NHL: December 2, 1974

The James H. Dillard House is a historic house at 571 Audubon Street in New Orleans, Louisiana. Built in the 19th century, it was from 1894 to 1913 the residence of James H. Dillard (1856–1940), a leading white educator of African-Americans across the American South during a period of difficult race relations. It was declared a National Historic Landmark on December 2, 1974.

== Description and history ==
The house is located in the Audubon neighborhood of New Orleans, on the east side of Audubon Street between St. Charles Avenue and Dominican Street. It is a roughly cruciform single-story wood-frame structure, with a main hip-roofed central section, from which other elements project to the front and rear. The front projection is gable-roofed, with a four-column neoclassical portico. The house's construction date is not known, but it has not had substantial alterations since the turn of the 20th century, the period of Dillard's ownership.

James H. Dillard was a Virginia native who was educated as a lawyer, but chose to work as a teacher and school administrator. In 1891, he was appointed professor of Latin at Tulane University, and moved to New Orleans. He quickly rose in prominence in both academic and civic circles, and was invited run for mayor. He forged relations with both white and African-American academic communities during this period, when race relations were particularly difficult. By 1905, he was serving as a trustee of a number of African-American colleges, and in 1908 took over leadership of the Negro Rural School Fund. Dillard University is named in his honor.

== See also ==
- List of National Historic Landmarks in Louisiana
- National Register of Historic Places listings in Orleans Parish, Louisiana
