= Virginia Randolph =

19th and 20th-century American schoolteacher

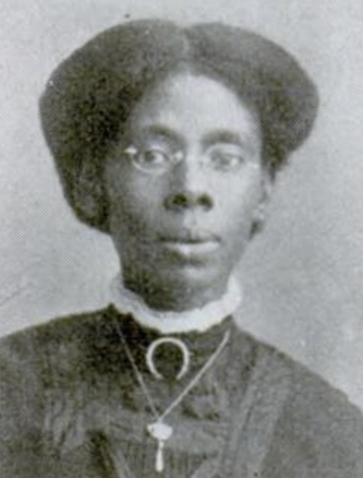
- Born: Virginia Estelle Randolph; May 1870; Richmond, Virginia, U.S.
- Died: March 16, 1958 (aged 87); Richmond, Virginia, U.S.
- Occupation: Educator

Virginia Estelle Randolph (May 1870 – March 16, 1958) was an American educator in Henrico County, Virginia. She was named the United States' first "Jeanes Supervising Industrial Teacher" by her Superintendent of Schools, Jackson Davis, and she led a program funded by the Jeanes Foundation to upgrade vocational training throughout the U.S. South as her career progressed. Her work is widely associated with vocational education. Two schools of the Henrico County Public Schools system were named in her honor and in 2009 Randolph was posthumously honored by the Library of Virginia as one of their "Virginia Women in History" for her career and contributions to education.

== Early life and education ==
Born in May 1870, (Note: According to the Encyclopedia Virginia article: "Although Randolph's birth date is commonly given as June 8, 1874, the birth register for the Bureau of Vital Statistics for the City of Richmond reveals that her actual birth was in May 1870. This earlier birth year is also supported by the Freedman’s Bank account entry for Nelson Randolph, wherein he reports having two daughters, Mary and Virginia, in 1871." The United States Federal Census of 1880 also shows that she was born in 1870. As mentioned, she was (erroneously) said to have been born in 1874, in Richmond, Virginia.) she was the daughter of former slaves Sarah Elizabeth Carter Randolph and Edward Nelson Randolph Her mother was a domestic worker from Campbell County and her father was a bricklayer. Virginia had three sisters: Mary, Sarah, and Emma, the latter of whom was one month old when her father died in 1874. Her mother remarried twice. Her second husband was Joseph Anderson, a carpenter. She then married a laborer, Joseph Minor. The family attended the Moore Street Missionary Baptist Church, which operated the Moore Street Industrial School. The school taught black children academic and manual arts, like printmaking, carpentry, and sewing. Randolph was a member of the church throughout her life. She was taught handiwork by her mother.

Raised during the Reconstruction era following the American Civil War (1861–1865), Randolph was educated in schools in Richmond, Virginia. The state formed a public school system in 1870. She attended Baker School, the first public school built for black students in Richmond. Her second school, Richmond Colored Normal School (now Armstrong High School), was founded by the Freedmen's Bureau in 1867. A "noted secondary school", its curriculum included botany, civil government, physical geography, map drawing, and physiology. It also prepared interested students to be teachers. She was a teacher at the age of 16.

== Career in public education ==
Randolph began her career as a school teacher. After a short teaching experience in Goochland County, she taught in Hanover County in 1893. She secured a teaching position with the Henrico County School Board the next year. She opened a one-room schoolhouse, the Mountain Road School. She fixed up the dilapidated building and traveled throughout the county to recruit students. As a teacher there, Randolph taught her students woodworking, sewing, and gardening, as well as academics. She believed that manual arts helped students have opportunities for employment if they were unable to acquire secondary education. She involved members of the community members—while also instilling pride and pro-activity—she established school improvement leagues and the Willing Worker Clubs. Beyond the importance of academics and learning skills, Randolph also thought it was important to promote healthy spirits and hearts. Towards that end, she established Sunday afternoon classes at the school, with the assistance of Virginia Union University faculty and students and her minister, Reverend R. O. Johnson. Her programs were financially supported by Bryan and Steward families and were promoted by Henrico County Schools's supervisor Jackson Davis.

In 1908, Davis named her to become the United States' first "Jeanes Supervising Industrial Teacher." Anna T. Jeanes, a wealthy Philadelphia Quaker, had set aside $1 million to establish a fund to maintain and assist rural schools for African Americans in the South. Among its projects, the Jeanes Foundation provided funds to employ black "supervisors" dedicated to upgrading vocational training programs for black students. Jeanes supervisors sought to improve schools throughout communities until 1968.

As the overseer of twenty-three elementary schools in Henrico County, Randolph developed the first in-service training program for black teachers and worked on improving the curriculum of the schools. With the freedom to design her own agenda, she shaped industrial work and community self-help programs to meet specific needs of schools. She chronicled her progress by becoming the author of the Henrico Plan which became a reference book for southern schools receiving assistance from the Jeanes Foundation, which became known as the Negro Rural School Fund. Randolph's teaching techniques and philosophy were later adopted in Great Britain's African colonies.

On March 30, 1908, following a proclamation by Virginia Governor Claude A. Swanson, Randolph founded the first Arbor Day Program in Virginia. She and her students planted twelve sycamore trees. Some of the trees remain standing as living monuments, but over the years, some of the trees were lost to disease. In 1976, the remaining ones were named the first notable trees in Virginia by the National Park Service.

In 1915, Randolph opened the Virginia Randolph Training School and later expanded the facility to include dormitories for future teachers. It was later renamed to Virginia Randolph Education Center. Randolph was appointed to the Industrial School Board of Colored Children after the death of another noted Richmonder, Maggie L. Walker. She also served for many years on the Inter-Racial and Health Board for the Commonwealth of Virginia.

After a 57-year career with Henrico County Public Schools, Randolph retired in 1949. A foundation to honor her and award scholarships was formed in 1954.

== Personal life ==
Randolph, who remained single throughout her life, took in children whose parents were unable to care for them to board at her house. She adopted Carrie B. Sample, one of fifty children that she took in and raised. She died in Richmond on March 16, 1958, at the age of 87.

== Legacy ==
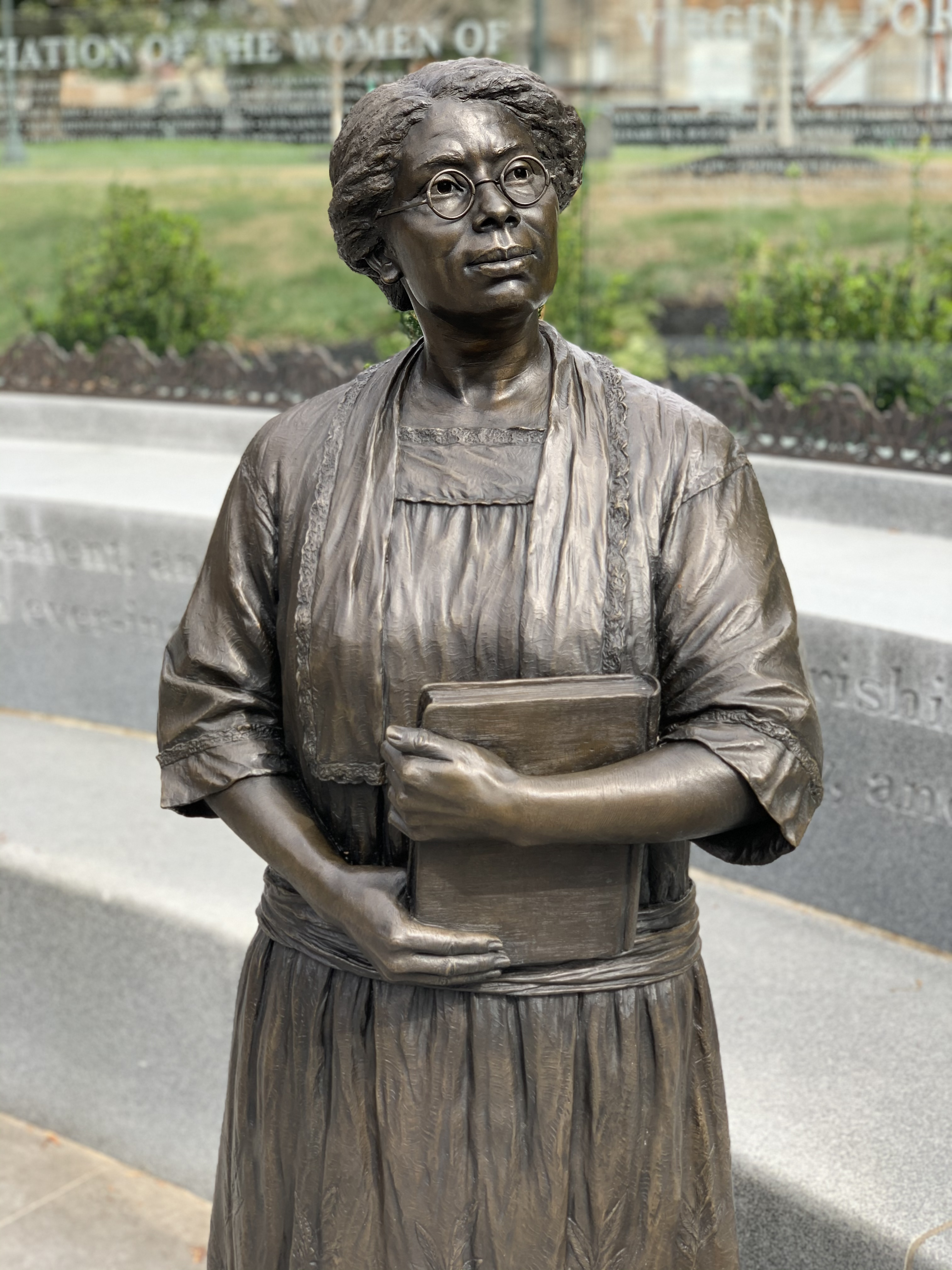
Statue of Virginia Randolph included in the Virginia Women's Monument.

The Virginia Randolph Fund was founded in 1936 as a tribute to her. The Southern Education Foundation, a not-for-profit foundation, was created in 1937 from four funds intended to support education for blacks: the Peabody Education Fund, the John F. Slater Fund, the Negro Rural School Fund, and the Virginia Randolph Fund.

- The Virginia Randolph Home Economics Cottage was made into a museum in memory of Randolph in 1970. The Virginia Historic Landmarks Commission designated the museum a State Historic Landmark. In 1976 the museum was named a National Historic Landmark by the United States Department of Interior, National Park Service. Randolph reportedly had an office in the building. Her gravesite is on the grounds.

The Academy at Virginia Randolph, formerly Virginia Randolph Community High School, in Glen Allen, Virginia is named in her honor.

The Virginia Randolph Foundation, Inc formed in 1954, annually awards scholarships to Henrico County high school students who will be attending a four-year college or university.
