= Albert and Shirley Small Special Collections Library =

Library in Virginia, US

Coordinates: 38.0361°N 78.5058°W

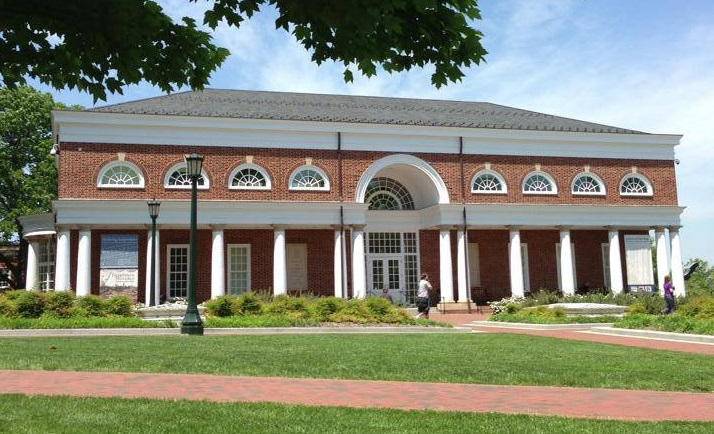
The Library in 2013. Two further stories of public space and stacks are underground

The Albert and Shirley Small Special Collections Library at the University of Virginia is a research library that specializes in American history and literature, history of Virginia and the southeastern United States, the history of the University of Virginia, Thomas Jefferson, and the history and arts of the book. The library is named after Albert and Shirley Small, who donated substantially to the construction of the library's current building. Albert Small, an alumnus of the University of Virginia, also donated his large personal collection of "autograph documents and rare, early printings of the Declaration of Independence." This collection includes a rare printing of the Dunlap broadside of the Declaration of Independence. Joining the library's existing Dunlap in the Tracy W. McGregor Collection of American History, Small's copy made U.Va. the only American institution with two examples of this, the earliest printing of the nation's founding document. It also includes the only letter written on July 4, 1776, by a signer of the Declaration, Caesar Rodney. The Albert H. Small Declaration of Independence Collection boasts an interactive digital display which allows visitors to view the historical documents electronically, providing access to children and an opportunity for visitors to manipulate the electronic copies without risk of damage to the original work.

Though the collections cover a range of fields, the library is best known for the Tracy W. McGregor Library of American History, the Clifton Waller Barrett Library of American Literature, the William Faulkner collections, Jorge Luis Borges Collections, the Sadleir-Black Collection of Gothic Fiction, extensive book, manuscript, and photography holdings in Virginia history, and original documents of the works, life, and legacy of Thomas Jefferson. Additional strengths include historical papers of James Madison, Dolly Madison and James Monroe, typography and other book arts, trade catalogues, slave narratives, equestrianism and other forms of traditional sports, documents, correspondence and oral records of the Southern Civil Rights Movement, political and public affairs papers of major Virginia political figures, and one of the world's largest collections of miniature books.

== History ==
Rufus Holsinger's image of the Rotunda burning in 1895, destroying most of the library collections

Thomas Jefferson situated a library, rather than a chapel, at the center of the University of Virginia's campus, unlike existing American colleges. He also composed the first list of books to be included in the collection and placed newspaper appeals for library gifts to fill the new library, which was housed in The Rotunda. James Madison, who was the second rector of the university after Jefferson, established the first endowment fund for acquisitions, through a bequest made in his will in 1836. After the Rotunda burned in 1895, only twenty percent of the original books survived; they are the longest held volumes in the Small Special Collections Library today, and librarians have for many years been acquiring replacements for burnt volumes. The University Archives and the earliest manuscript gift to the university—the papers of Richard Henry Lee, acquired before 1832—also survived.

In the early decades of the twentieth century, many rare and unique items were added to the library's collections, both books and manuscripts. Purchases were also made as well, including the John Henry Ingram collection of Edgar Allan Poe. In 1930 a "Virginia Collection" was established in one wing of the library and the first archivist was hired. Following the construction of the new Alderman Library in 1938, the Division of Rare Books and Manuscripts was organized to house and administer the principal historical materials in the library's collection. Over time, these units became separated, so that by 1962 there were two divisions: the Rare Books Division and the Manuscripts and University Archives Division. These departments merged in 1987 to form the Special Collections Department. In 2004, the current building opened.

== Collections ==
=== Foundational collections ===
In 1938, the library accepted as a donation the library of Tracy W. McGregor, the Detroit philanthropist and book collector; McGregor had bequeathed his collection to the administrators of the McGregor Fund, who selected the University of Virginia as its final home. The fund also supported the construction of the McGregor Library, a large room in the new Alderman Library that housed the Rare Books reading room for several decades. McGregor's collection of rare books, maps, and manuscripts comprised three areas of study: American exploration and history, British literature, and Cotton Mather and other members of the Mather family. The collection immediately established the University of Virginia as a center for the study of American history and culture.

In 1960, the library received a deposit that established it as a major site for the study of American Literature, when Clifton Waller Barrett placed in the library his major collection of books and manuscripts of major and minor American writers through 1940. The library has continued to collect in the tradition of Barrett since the collection arrived; Barrett's donation was finalized in the early 1990s. The Barrett book collection contains first and other significant editions of virtually every major work of American literature from the nation's founding to 1950, as well as many minor works, since Barrett's collecting interests stretched well beyond the canon. Of particular interest are deep holdings in little known writers, and an extensive collectionof editions and other printed materials related to Harriet Beecher Stowe's novel Uncle Tom's Cabin. Some of the significant manuscript materials held within the Barrett Collection include more than a hundred letters of the early American novelist Charles Brockden Brown, manuscripts of several major works of Washington Irving and James Fenimore Cooper, hundreds of manuscript fragments for the significantly enlarged second edition of Walt Whitman's Leaves of Grass, a large collection of the papers of Louisa May Alcott and the Alcott family, significant manuscripts and correspondence of Mark Twain, the papers of Stephen Crane, including a manuscript of The Red Badge of Courage, over 650 letters of Henry James, significant holdings in the manuscripts, personal papers, and correspondence of Lafcadio Hearn, Robert Frost (including a recently discovered unpublished poem), and Ernest Hemingway, and the papers of novelists John Dos Passos and Ellen Glasgow and poets Vachel Lindsay and Sara Teasdale.

=== Thomas Jefferson ===
The university has long been the home to many original documents relating to Thomas Jefferson and his family. Holdings include hundreds of letters to and from Jefferson, his architectural drawings, family documents, numerous books from Jefferson's library, an extensive research collection of works about Jefferson, and artifacts such as one of his polygraphs and the telescope with which Jefferson watched the construction of the university from his hilltop home nearby, Monticello.

=== University of Virginia archives and faculty papers ===
The library documents the history of the university all the way back to its founding; holdings include the original minute book of the Board of Visitors, written mostly in the hand of the first secretary, Thomas Jefferson, as well as the first matriculation book, which documents every student who entered the university in its early decades, including notables such as Edgar Allan Poe. Early ledgers of the university document the building of the university's structures, the renting of enslaved laborers to build and maintain the campus, and the development of a curriculum. Documents from the late nineteenth- through the twentieth century document the development of the university's modern infrastructure, student organizations, expansion of the campus and operations, and debates over the university's refusal to admit women and black students.

Papers of many of the university's most prominent faculty are held in Special Collections, including civil rights activist Julian Bond, physicist Jesse Beams, poet Charles Wright, and novelists Ann Beattie and John Casey.

=== William Faulkner ===
U.Va. holds the largest collection of printed and manuscript materials related to William Faulkner. His association with the library began when he came to the university as a visiting faculty member, first in the 1930s and then in the late 1950s. The William Faulkner Foundation, which Faulkner founded, was created in part as a mechanism by which to secure the continued deposit of his papers in the university's Manuscripts Collection after his death, which occurred in 1962. This collection, converted from a deposit to a gift in 1962, comprises the bulk of the manuscripts and typescripts of the writer's novels and short stories, along with extensive correspondence and other related materials. In 1960, scholar and bibliographer Linton Massey had donated his massive collection of Faulkner editions, periodicals, and secondary works. Faulkner's daughter, Jill, deposited many further manuscripts and over 300 books from Faulkner's library over the course of many years, and additional Faulkner collections, such as the papers of U.Va. professor and Faulkner biographer Joseph Blotner, have been added. The collection is the basis for a major online archive of Faulkner audio recordings.

=== Virginia ===
The collections are an important source for research on the history of Virginia, with particular strength in Charlottesville and Central Virginia. Collections of many significant Virginia families, plantations, and businesses are at the core of historical materials documenting Virginia from its earliest days to the present. Plantation and early family papers contain rare information about enslaved persons, including a significant collection of letters written by previously enslaved Virginians who moved to Liberia. The collections are notable in their representation of regional debates over race, including the archives of influential eugenicists and civil rights activists. Also notable are the records of the Charlottesville School Board, which document the era of desegregation and massive resistance. Papers of Charlottesville and Albemarle County political figures are wide-ranging.

=== Political cartoons and caricature ===
The collections are rich in the genre of political or editorial cartoons, and include the archives of Richmond editorial cartoonist Ed Seibel, UVA alumnus Bob Gorrell, and Art Wood. The Gerald Meeks Collection is a comprehensive collection of examples of American cartoon artists; among its treasures are a large collection of Oscar Cesare originals. The papers of Edward Stettinius Jr. include a large number of original editorial cartoons about the founding of the United Nations. A complete set of Vanity Fair (UK magazine) caricatures also resides in the library. In 2018 the library acquired the papers and original art of editorial cartoonist and fine artist Pat Oliphant.

=== Gordon Collection ===
The Gordon Collection (also known as the Douglas H. Gordon Collection) comprises some 1200 volumes of French books dating from the 16th through the 19th century. Over 600 were printed before 1600, and many retain their original bindings.

== Research and outreach ==
Special Collections is visited by a wide range of audiences, and its collections likewise have been featured in significant publications worldwide. Major cross-institutional digital humanities projects featuring the collections include the Walt Whitman Archive , the Edgar Allan Poe Society's collected e-texts website, the Rossetti Archive, Mark Twain in his Times, and Uncle Tom's Cabin & American Culture. Among several large digital collections produced in-house are the Jackson Davis Collection, a significant resource for the study of African American educational history and the photo archive of the studio of Rufus Holsinger, who documented life in Charlottesville, Virginia; this was the first University of Virginia collection to join the Digital Public Library of America project and one of the DPLA's founding collections.

The library's collections play a prominent role in many courses taught in the Rare Book School, which serves hundreds of scholars, librarians, and book dealers each summer. Of particular interest are the extensive publishers bindings, early printed works, and a working Hinman Collator.

In 2012, the Special Collections played a significant role in documenting the ouster and reinstatement of the university's president, Teresa Sullivan. Along with collecting physical documentation of the public and press reaction to the events, the library made news for collecting born digital materials and accepting materials collected for the library by members of the public.
