= Tuskegee Institute Silver Anniversary Lecture =

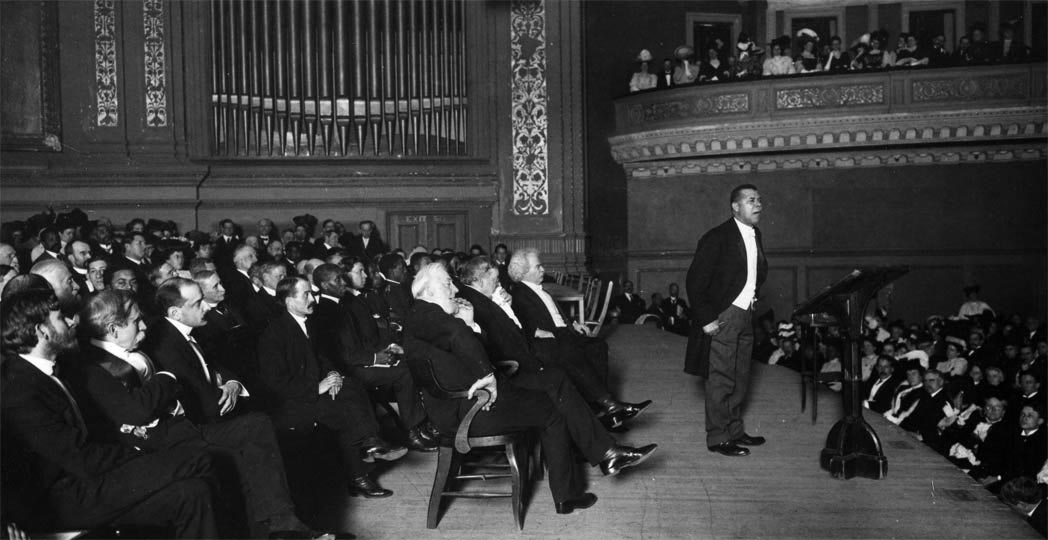
- Booker T. Washington at Carnegie Hall in 1906. Mark Twain is seated behind him.
- Date: January 23, 1906
- Location: Carnegie Hall
- First reporter: The New York Times
- Participants: Booker T. Washington, Mark Twain, Joseph Hodges Choate, Robert Curtis Ogden, John D. Rockefeller, Henry H. Rogers, Clarence H. Mackay, Morris K. Jesup, J. G. Phelps Stokes, Isaac Newton Seligman, George Foster Peabody, John Crosby Brown, Carl Schurz, W. H. Schieffelin, William Jay Schieffelin, Joseph Hodges Choate, Henry Villard, Nicholas Murray Butler, Cleveland H. Dodge, Alfred Shaw, Felix M. Warburg, R. Fulton Cutting, Collis P. Huntington, Robert Bowne Minturn, Jr., Jacob H. Schiff, Paul M. Warburg

The Tuskegee Institute Silver Anniversary Lecture was an event at Carnegie Hall on January 23, 1906, to support the education of African Americans in the South. It involved many prominent members of New York society, with speakers including Booker T. Washington, Mark Twain, Joseph Hodges Choate, and Robert Curtis Ogden. It was the beginning of a fund raising drive started by Booker T. Washington for the Tuskegee Institute with a goal of making up the annual operating shortfall, plant improvements, and creating an endowment. There were three distinct appeals for the fundraising: adding an annual income of $90,000 a year, creating an endowment of $1,800,000, and installing a heating plant at a cost of $34,000.

The donations were to be made with the idea that an educational duty was owing to the African Americans that had become a part of the population of the United States upon the abolition of slavery.

The lecture at Carnegie Hall was in honor of the "silver jubilee" celebration, or 25 years since Tuskegee Institute was founded in April 1881.

== The event ==
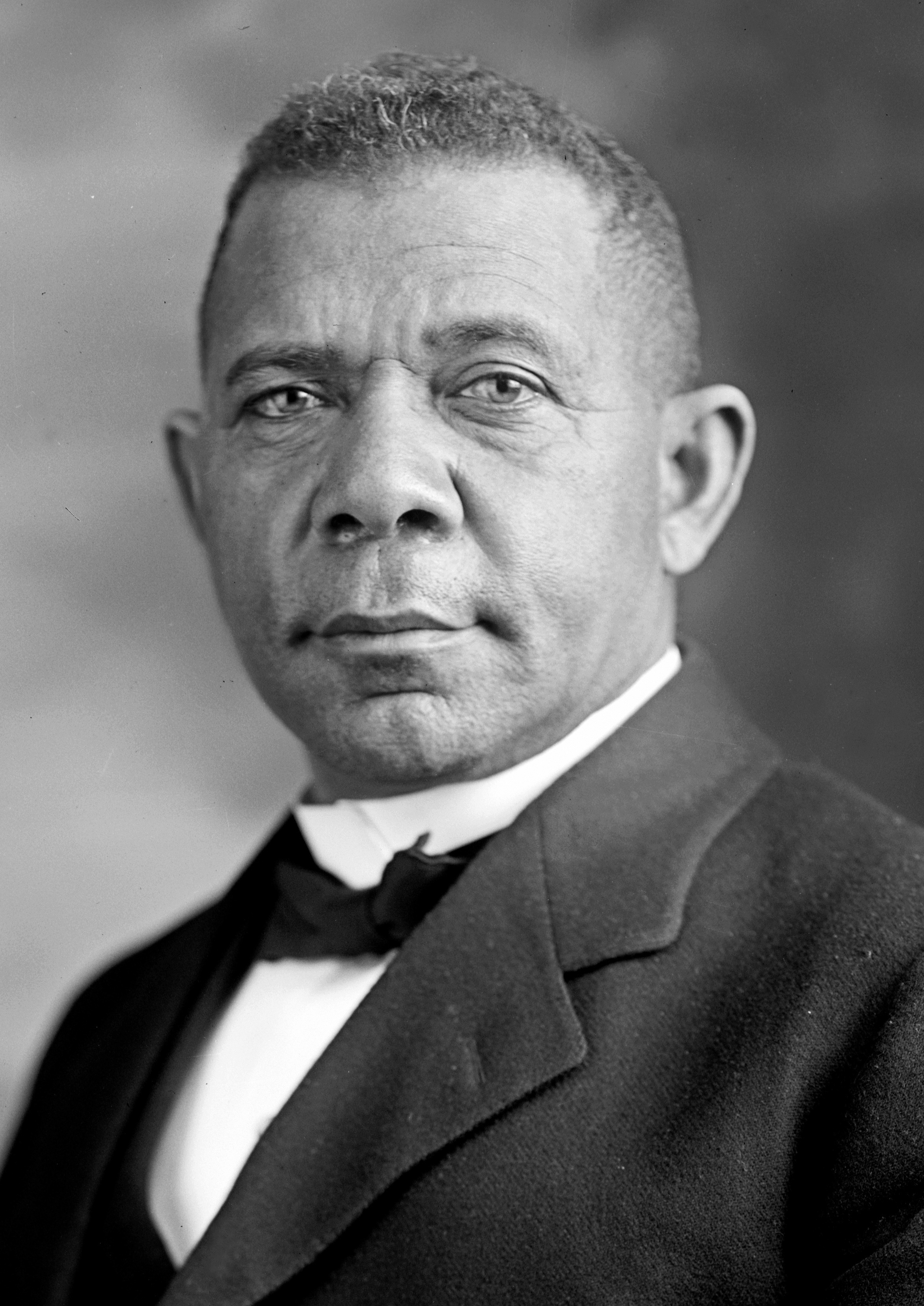
Booker T Washington, 1905

The lecture took place on January 23, 1906, and was reported on the next day as the lead story on the front page of The New York Times. The speakers included Washington himself, along with great orators of the day including Mark Twain, Joseph Hodges Choate, and Robert Curtis Ogden. Eight African American singers entertained between the speeches with revival songs.

Carnegie Hall was filled to capacity the night of the lecture, with a large group gathering outside. The New York Times likened the crowd to ones seen at Carnegie Hall a few months earlier, when New York District Attorney William Travers Jerome had used the venue to orchestrate his reelection campaign.

Many New York luminaries attended: John D. Rockefeller, Henry H. Rogers, Clarence H. Mackay, Morris K. Jesup, J. G. Phelps Stokes, Isaac Newton Seligman, George Foster Peabody, John Crosby Brown, Carl Schurz, W. H. Schieffelin, William Jay Schieffelin, Joseph Hodges Choate, Henry Villard, Nicholas Murray Butler, Cleveland H. Dodge, Alfred Shaw, Felix M. Warburg, R. Fulton Cutting, Collis P. Huntington, Robert Bowne Minturn, Jr., Jacob H. Schiff, Paul M. Warburg.

William Jay Schieffelin, a progressive businessman and socialite related to the Vanderbilt family, opened the lecture and introduced Joseph Hodges Choate, who was a well known lawyer and diplomat. Choate was associated with many of the most famous litigations in American legal history, including the Kansas prohibition cases, the Chinese exclusion cases, the Maynard election returns case, the Income Tax Suit, and the Tilden, Stanford, and AT Stewart will cases. He was influential in the founding of the Metropolitan Museum of Art.

Mark Twain's speech was punctuated by laughter and applause, especially when he referred to wealthy men who swear off tax assessments.

Booker T. Washington was introduced by Robert Curtis Ogden, a progressive businessman and financial supporter of the Tuskegee Institute. He had excerpts of his speech published by the New York Times.

"The negro in many ways has proved his worth and loyalty to this country. What he now asks is that through such institutions as Hampton, Fisk, and Tuskegee he shall be given the chance to render high and intelligent service to our country in the future. I have faith that such an opportunity will be given him."

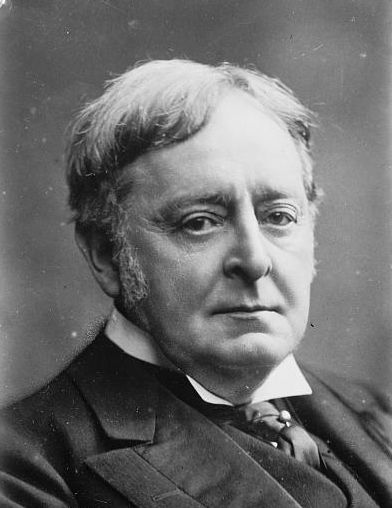
Joseph Hodges Choate, 1910

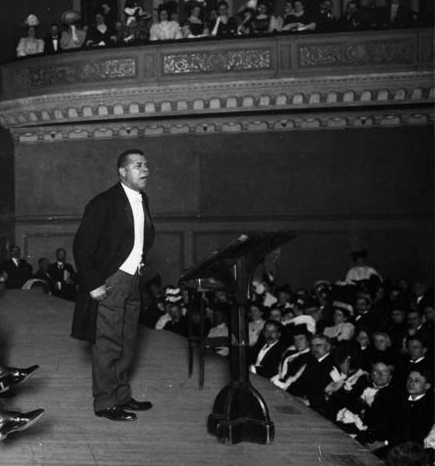
Booker T. Washington delivering his speech

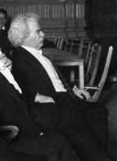
Mark Twain after speaking at Carnegie Hall, listening to Booker T. Washington's speech
