= Moonlight School =

Adult literacy program in Kentucky

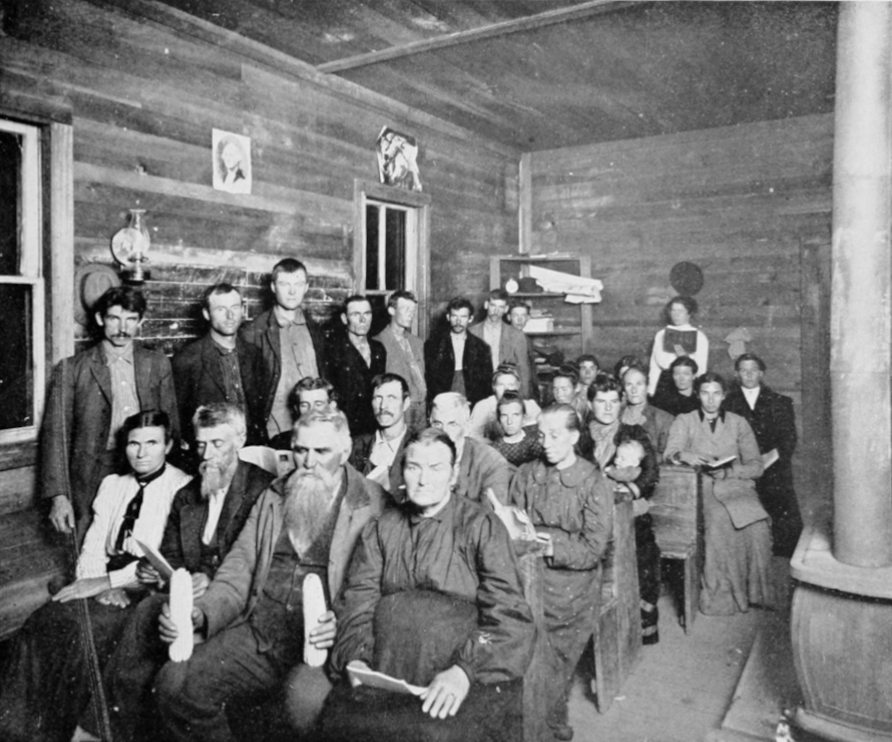
Moonlight School in Kentucky, c. 1916

Moonlight Schools were a program of educational offerings for illiterate adults in Kentucky in the early 1900s which spread to many other U.S. states.

== History ==
The first Moonlight School was created in September 1911, in Rowan County, Kentucky by Cora Wilson Stewart, then a superintendent in the Rowan County Schools. Adults would attend school at night in the buildings where children studied during the day. The school supposedly only operated on moonlit nights so people could get there and home safely which gave the project its name.

Teachers were asked to volunteer to teach at night and they also canvassed their districts to see who might need literacy instruction. There were no school books for adults who couldn't read, so a newspaper was published with a very small word list which had area news and also introduced a subtle element of competition between the area schools. Once students had mastered basic reading they could also learn other subjects which included "history, civics, English, health and sanitation, geography, home economics, agriculture, horticulture and good roads."

== Program growth ==
In 1914, at Stewart's urging, Governor James B. McCreary had the Commonwealth of Kentucky create the Kentucky Illiteracy Commission to extend this program statewide with an aim to end illiteracy in Kentucky by 1920. Counties had competitions to see which could wipe out illiteracy first, with bibles given to the students in the winning county which was Tabor Hill, in Rowan County. The Kentucky Federation of Women's Clubs and the Colonial Dames led a fundraising and letter writing effort and ministers observed "No Illiteracy Sunday" in their churches.

Before their second session of the Moonlight Schools, there was a Moonlight School Institute held for the teachers, according to Stewart it was "the first institute for night school teachers in America." By the second session, the program had enrolled 1,600 students, 350 of whom learned to read and write. A home department was established who would visit people in their homes who could not get to one of the schoolhouses. Since the state still had legal segregation, there were also 15 Colored Moonlight Schools created in Kentucky by 1915. Mercer County, Kentucky offered a Moonlight School in every school district that served Black students. In 1915, Stewart published the Country Life Reader: First Book and, in 1916, she published the Country Life Reader: Second Book. Both books featured material of interest to adults, written for people with low literacy. Stewart became concerned during World War I when Selective Service determined that 700,000 men were illiterate, so she developed The Soldier’s First Book to help teach military recruits to read.

== Expansion and legacy ==
Alabama and Mississippi began their own Moonlight School programs shortly after Kentucky did, and by 1916 eighteen states had their own Moonlight Schools. Ten thousand adults were educated in North Carolina's Moonlight Schools in 1915. In 1922 Stewart—who was then Chairman of the Illiteracy Commission of the National Education Association as well as Chairman of the Illiteracy Committees of the National Council of Education—wrote a book about the program to "tell the story of the moonlight schools."

One of the schoolhouses that was a Moonlight School is on the campus of Morehead State University, and is a historic site now called the Cora Wilson Stewart Moonlight School. The Moonlight Schools Collection at Morehead State has collected oral histories and research concerning the history of the Moonlight Schools and the life of Cora Wilson Stewart.
