= James H. Dillard =

American educator (1856–1940)

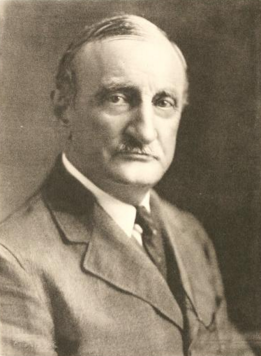
- Dillard, as pictured in his 1932 book Selected writings of James Hardy Dillard
- Born: James Hardy Dillard; October 24, 1856; Nansemond County, Virginia, U.S.
- Died: August 2, 1940 (aged 83); Charlottesville, Virginia, U.S.
- Occupation(s): Educator, advocate
- Spouse(s): Mary Harmanson (1881–1896, her death); Avarene Lippincott Budd (1899–1940, his death)
- Children: 10 (6 with Harmanson and 4 with Budd)

James Hardy Dillard (October 24, 1856 – August 2, 1940), also known as J. H. Dillard, was an educator from Virginia. The son of slaveholders, Dillard was educated at Washington and Lee University and held a variety of teaching positions. In 1891, Dillard was named a professor at Tulane University in New Orleans, Louisiana.

There, he became increasingly active in advocating for black education. He led the Jeanes Fund from 1907 to 1931 and also led the Slater Fund for seven years. Following the merger of two black colleges in New Orleans in 1930, Dillard University was founded and was named in his honor.

== Personal life ==
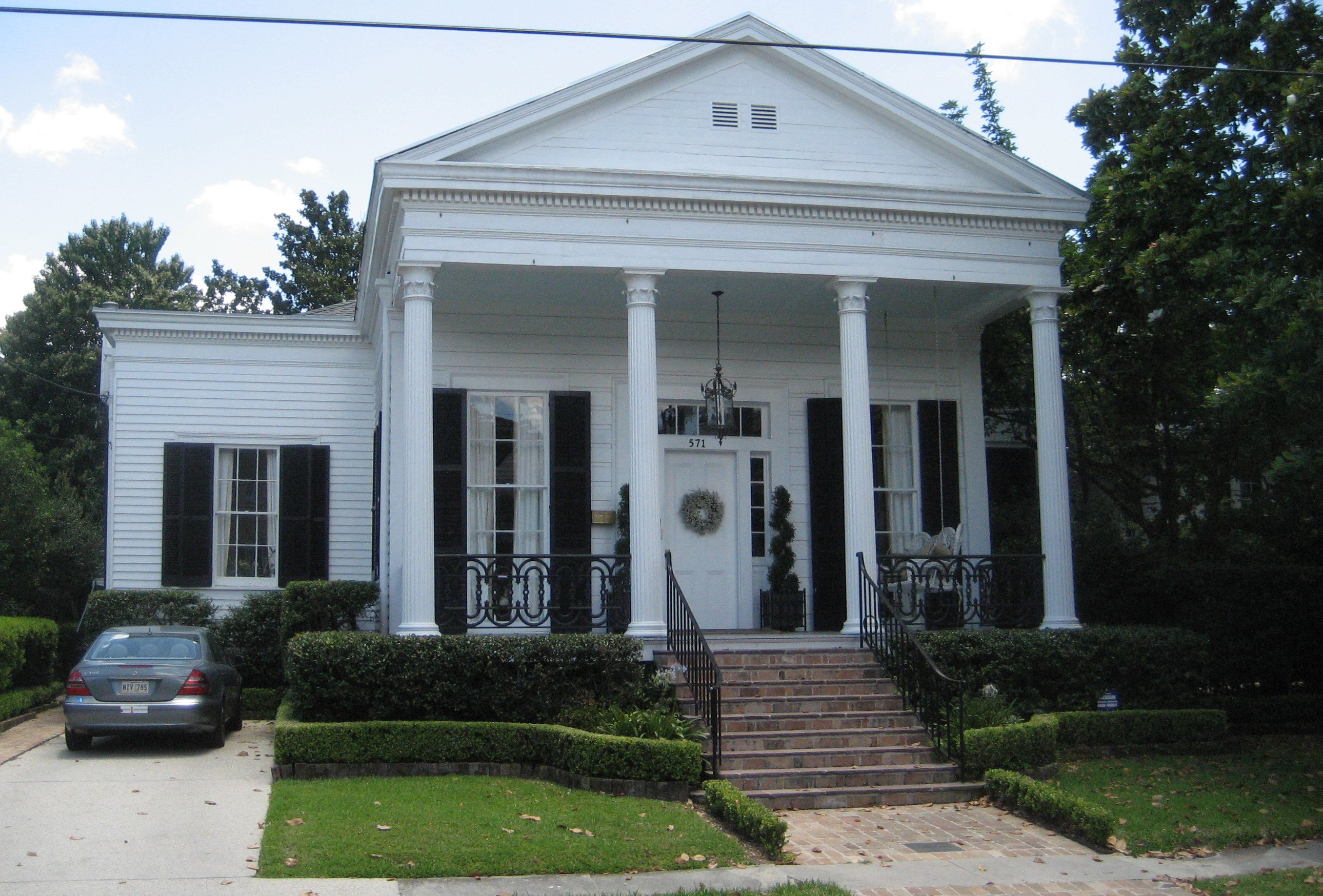
Dillard's house in New Orleans

Dillard was born in Nansemond County, Virginia, on October 24, 1856. His parents, James and Sara Brownrigg (Cross) Dillard, were slave owners. Dillard attended Washington and Lee University, then taught as an assistant professor of mathematics there from 1876 to 1877. For the next five years, he was the principal of the Rodman School in Norfolk, Virginia. He then spent another five years overseeing Norfolk Academy, then was accepted as principal of the Mary Institute at Washington University in St. Louis, in Missouri. Dillard led the school from 1887 to 1891.

Dillard married Mary Harmanson on July 5, 1882; they had six children. After her death, he married Avarene Lippincott Budd, with whom Dillard had four children. Son Hardy Cross Dillard served as a judge on the International Court of Justice from 1970 to 1979. James Hardy Dillard died on August 2, 1940, in his home in Charlottesville, Virginia.

The James H. Dillard House in New Orleans is today recognized as a National Historic Landmark. Along with the university in New Orleans, J. H. Dillard is the namesake of Fort Lauderdale's Dillard High School (and its predecessor Old Dillard High School, which now houses an African-American history museum).

== Educational work ==
Dillard was appointed a professor of Latin at Tulane University in New Orleans, in 1891; then was named dean of the College of Arts and Sciences three years later. As president of the New Orleans Public Library, he promoted the construction of a Carnegie library for black citizens. He left Tulane to become director of the Negro Rural School Fund (Jeanes Fund), following the death of founder Anna T. Jeanes in 1907, leading it until 1931. In 1910, he became director of the Slater Fund, leading it for seven years. These two philanthropic foundations supported vocational training for blacks and training institutes for black teachers. Dillard was named vice president of the Phelps Stokes Fund in 1925.

Dillard University was formed in 1930 following the merger of New Orleans University and Straight College, two institutions where Dillard was a trustee, and the university was named in his honor. Dillard won the Gold award for Distinguished Achievements in Race Relations of the Harmon Award in 1928, for "his success in increasing county training schools for Negroes from four to more than three hundred, with increased public appropriations from a little more than $3,000 to $1,000,000 annually."
