= Kentucky Education Association =

The Kentucky Education Association (KEA) is an advocacy and lobbying group for "improved education funding, safe schools, better materials, smaller class sizes, and the empowerment of school employees and parents" in Kentucky's education system. It was founded in 1857. Membership is voluntary, and all school employees can join. KEA has satellites in every school district of Kentucky and is an affiliate of the National Education Association. It is the largest professional group in the state.

== Organization ==
KEA is divided into 13 separate districts, each governed by an elected board of directors. KEA also elects members to its policy making arm, the Delegate Assembly, which is held each year, and to the National Education Association's representative delegation.

KEA runs 15 offices throughout Kentucky and employs over 55 staff members under an Executive Director. KEA's president and vice president are allowed to work full-time for KEA rather than holding normal classroom positions.

== Political influence ==
KEA's political unit is called the Kentucky Educators' Political Action Committee (KEPAC) It was an FEC-registered federal Political Action Committee during the 2000 and 2008 elections. In the 2008 election, KEA spent over $27,000 to send direct mail to influence its members to vote for U.S. Senate candidate Bruce Lunsford. The Richmond Register reported some influence on the 2011 Kentucky gubernatorial election over the issue of funding for education.

In 2011 the KEA pressed Kentucky lawmakers not to proceed with proposed cuts to the education budget, but the bill passed on March 2, 2011.

Earlier in 2011 the KEA withdrew their opposition to Senate Bill 12, which would give authority for school superintendents rather than school councils to hire principals, to focus on issues of education funding.

In 2008 KEA/KEPAC was ranked as the number-three political action committee in Kentucky, having spent $286,014 in the state. In 2010, the organization spent $435,291.18 on state political activities and ended the year with $451,575.66 of funds.

=== Historical ===
In 1911, KEA elected its first female president, Cora Wilson Stewart.

In 1913, KEA was criticized for not fully supporting the women's suffrage movement in Kentucky. The Lexington Leader claimed it was because it would mean equal rights and therefore higher pay to female teachers. KEA denied the allegation.

In 1955, KEA successfully lobbied both gubernatorial candidates to pledge an increase of $20 million to public schools in Kentucky.

In 1968, KEA helped to push through an increase to the state's sales tax (to 5%) to provide additional funding for education.

The group organized a widespread teacher's strike in the state in 1970 to demand a pay raise. Throughout the 1970s, KEA tried repeatedly and unsuccessfully to get a bill giving teachers the right to unionization. This fight resulted in numerous work stoppages.

In 1985 the KEA successfully lobbied for an education bill to pass.

In 1987, KEA backed a Republican governor (John Harper) for the first time in their 13-year history of gubernatorial endorsement.

== Current leadership ==
- President: Joel Wolford
- Vice President: Jessica Hiler
- Executive Director: Richard Mullins

== See also ==
- Education in Kentucky
- History of education in Kentucky
