= Robert Curtis Ogden =

American businessman and educationalist (1836–1913)

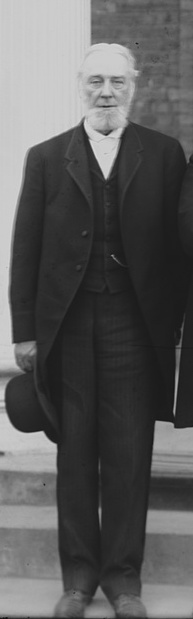
- Robert Curtis Ogden, 1906 in Tuskegee, Alabama
- Born: June 20, 1836; Philadelphia, Pennsylvania
- Died: August 6, 1913 (aged 77); Kennebunkport, Maine

Robert Curtis Ogden (June 20, 1836 – August 6, 1913) was a businessman who promoted education in the Southern United States.

== Biography ==
Ogden was born in Philadelphia, Pennsylvania, on June 20, 1836. He began work in a dry-goods store at 14 years of age, and moved with his family to New York City in 1852. By 1860, he had married Ellen Lewis, was living in Brooklyn, and was a partner in the clothing firm of Devlin and Company. He served a few months as a soldier during the Civil War. In 1861 he had visited the South as an agent of his firm. Once peace was established, he was much impressed by the work of his friend Samuel C. Armstrong, who founded and headed Hampton Institute in Virginia. Ogden resolved to make similar efforts to promote education in the South.

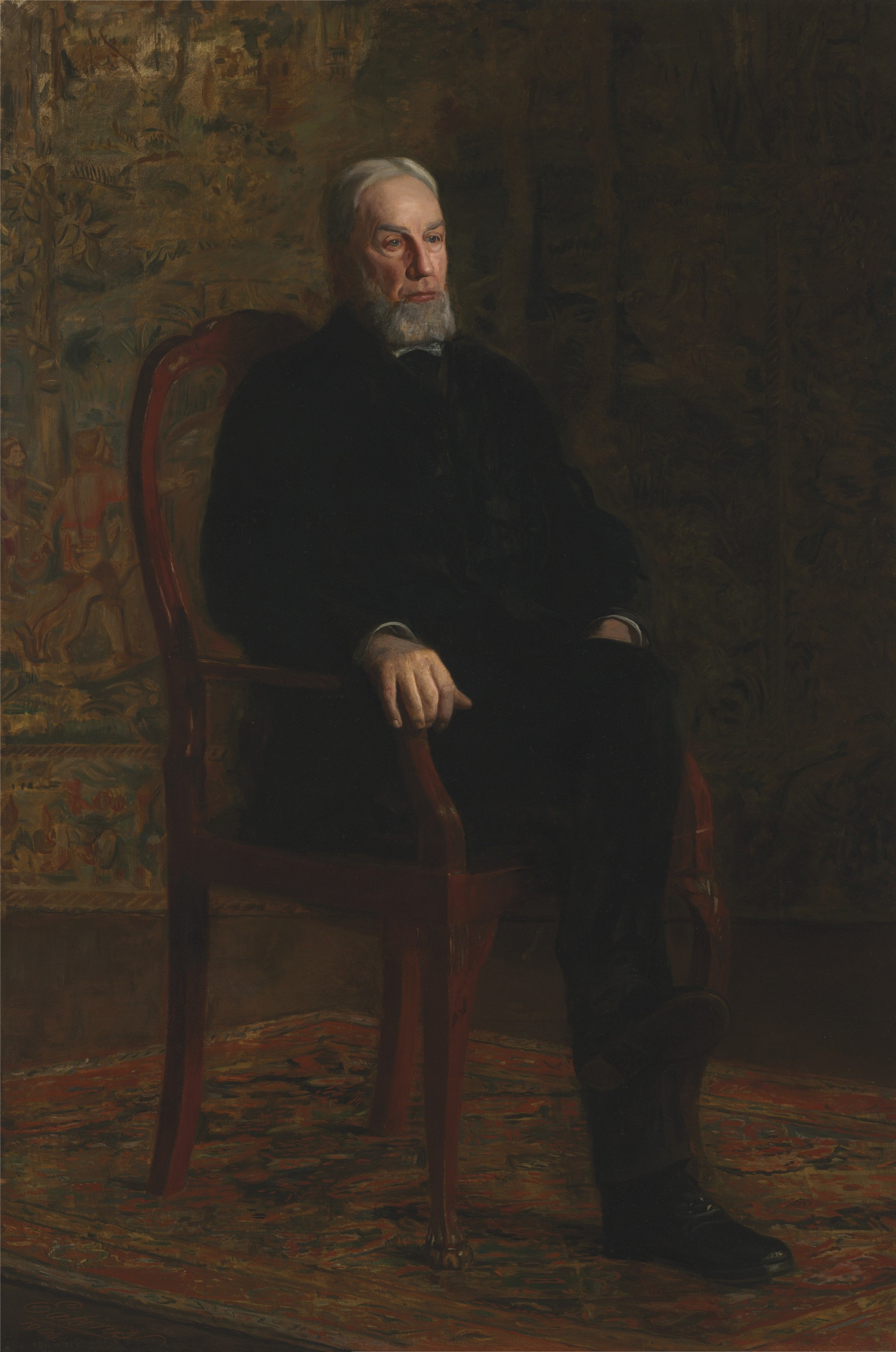
Robert C Ogden, By Thomas Eakins

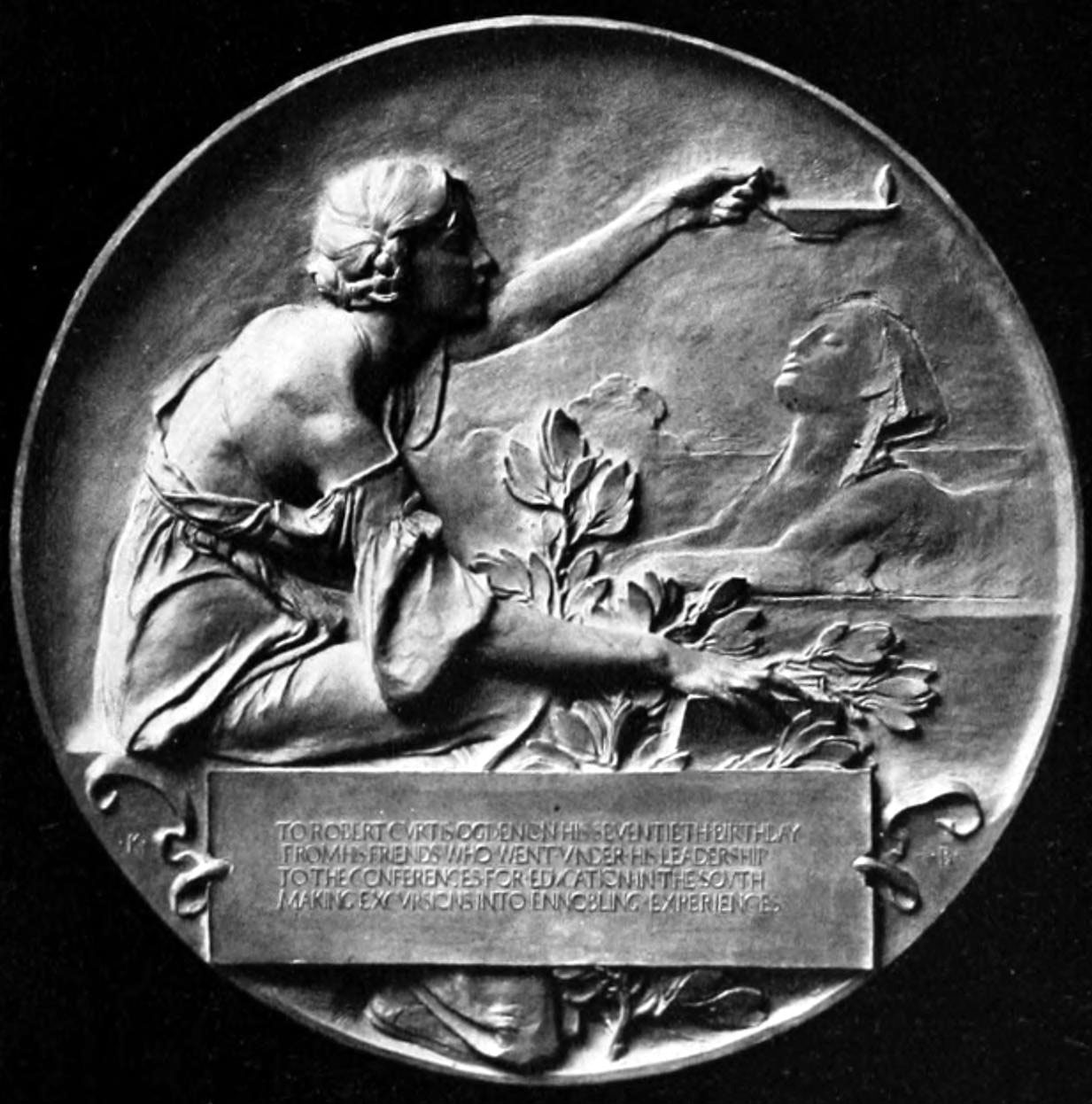
Robert Ogden testimonial tablet in NYC, by Schevill Karl Bitter 1904

In 1879, he associated with John Wanamaker in his retail operations in Philadelphia. He also became a trustee at Hampton and involved himself in the promotion of education for both blacks and whites in the South. He eventually headed the Southern Education Board which worked for better funding and higher standards for Southern schools. As a member of the General Education Board, he participated in the funding of Southern educational projects; he was president of the Southern Education Board. He was also president of the Conference for Education in the South.

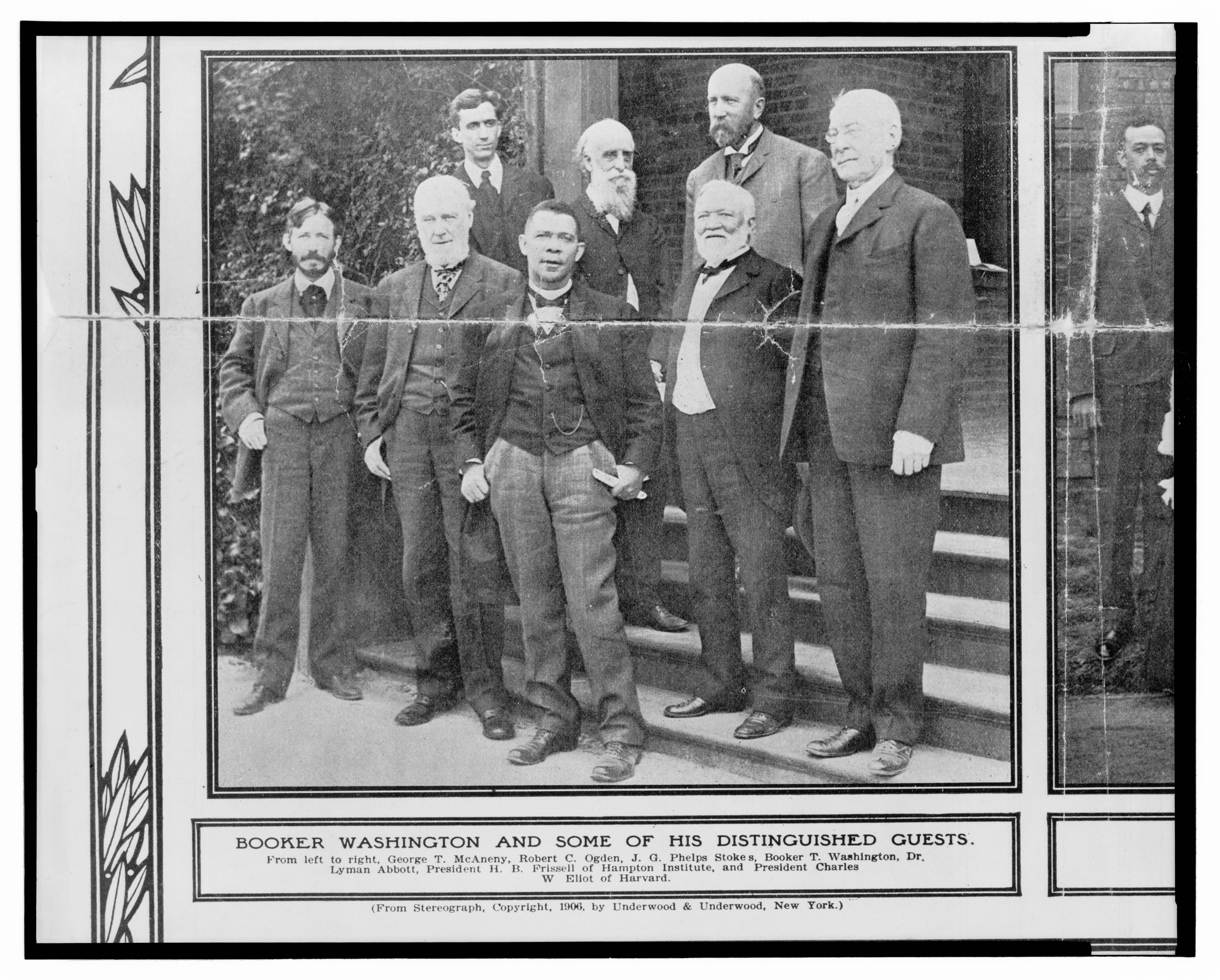
With Booker Washington and other dignitaries

He was a great financial supporter of Booker T. Washington, and took part publicly speaking on his behalf, including at the Tuskegee Institute Silver Anniversary Lecture at Carnegie Hall in 1906, where he introduced Washington after Mark Twain had spoken.

He received honorary degrees from several institutions. He was an elder and a liberal member of the Presbyterian Church. Ogden died on August 6, 1913, in Kennebunkport, Maine.

== Literary works ==
- "Samuel Chapman Armstrong", Founder's Day address at Hampton Institute (1894)
- Sunday School Teaching (1894)
- Pew Rents and the New Testament (1892)
