= General Education Board =

American private foundation

The General Education Board was a private organization which was used primarily to support higher education and medical schools in the United States, and to help rural white and black schools in the South, as well as modernize farming practices in the South. It helped eradicate hookworm and created the county agent system in American agriculture, linking research as state agricultural experiment stations with actual practices in the field.

The Board was created in 1902 after John D. Rockefeller donated an initial $1 million (equivalent to $37,211,500 in 2025) to its cause. The Rockefeller family would eventually give over $180 million to fund the General Education Board. Prominent member Frederick Taylor Gates envisioned "The Country School of To-Morrow," wherein "young and old will be taught in practicable ways how to make rural life beautiful, intelligent, fruitful, re-creative, healthful, and joyous". By 1934 the Board was making grants of $5.5 million a year. It spent nearly all its money by 1950 and closed in 1964.

== History ==
The formation of the General Education Board began in early 1902. On January 15, 1902, two months after the Southern Education Board was founded, a small group of men gathered at the home of banker Morris Ketchum Jessup to discuss education. This meeting included John D. Rockefeller Jr., Robert Curtis Ogden, George Foster Peabody, Jabez Lamar Monroe Curry, William Henry Baldwin Jr., and Wallace Buttrick. That day, the men discussed raising educational standards, and widening educational opportunities.

On February 27, 1902, a second meeting was held at John D. Rockefeller Jr.'s home. This meeting was attended by the guests of the original meeting but also included Daniel Coit Gilman, Albert Shaw, Walter Hines Page, and Edward Morse Shepard. At the climax of the meeting, it was announced that John D. Rockefeller Sr. would give $1,000,000 for the inauguration of an educational program. Thus, the General Education Board was born.

The General Education Board was incorporated by an Act of Congress that took place on January 12, 1903. Their main object being "the promotion of education within the United States of America, without distinction of race, sex, or creed"

The original members of the General Education Board were: William H. Baldwin Jr., Jabez L.M. Curry, Frederick T. Gates, Daniel C. Gilman, Morris K. Jessup, Robert C. Ogden, Walter Hines Page, George Foster Peabody, and Albert Shaw.

Upon evidence that this work would be effectively carried out, and Wallace Buttrick's 1905 observation that "the fundamental problem of the South is the recovery of the fertility of the soil," the program grew further. on 30 June 1905 he made an additional gift of $10,000,000 and in 1907 a further sum of $32,000,000.

Rockefeller eventually gave it $180 million, which was used primarily to support higher education and medical schools in the United States and to improve farming practices in the South. It helped eradicate hookworm and created the county agent system in American agriculture, linking research at state agricultural experiment stations with actual practices in the field. By 1934 it was making grants of $5.5 million a year. In c.1935 it dispersed $370,000 among four elite educational-radio projects, e.g. Wisconsin's and Ohio's early School of the Air experiments, and others. It spent nearly all its money by 1950 and ceased operating as a separate entity in 1960, when its programs were subsumed into the Rockefeller Foundation.

== Programs ==
It had four main programs:

1. The promotion of practical farming in the southern states. Through the Department of Agriculture the board had made accumulative annual appropriations amounting in by 1912-1913 to $673,750 for the purpose of promoting agriculture by the establishment of demonstration farms under the direction of Dr. Seaman A. Knapp. About 236 men were employed in supervising such farms. In 1906 the General Education Board contributed $7,000, and due to the increased success of the programs in reaching the distant southern farming communities, G.E.B. contributions grew each year. In addition to promoting demonstration farms, instructors for the education of farmers were also furnished. The work of the Board also influenced the practical teaching of agriculture in the schools of the southern United States.

2. The establishment of public high schools in the southern states. Upon the General Education Board's foundation in 1902, it was stated that the immediate prerogative of the organization was to "devote itself to studying and aiding to promote the educational needs of the people of our southern states". For this purpose, the board appropriated for state universities or state departments of education in the South sums to pay for the salaries of high school representatives to travel throughout their states and stimulate public sentiment in favor of high schools. As a result of this work, 912 high schools had been established in 11 southern states by 1914.

3. The promotion of institutions of higher learning. By 1914 the board had made conditional appropriations to the amount of $8,817,500, gifts towards an approximate total of $41,020,500. This money was expended throughout the United States. The General Education Board also provided funds to fund existing medical schools for Black students, such as Meharry Medical College and Howard University Medical School. However, the General Education Board encouraged graduates to stay working in the rural South. Schools with graduates that established private medical practices in the North received less funding. Additionally, fellowships awarded to Black medical programs discouraged medical scientific research projects and encouraged more remedial education. In a 1910 report, Abraham Flexner stated that Black schools should focus on "hygiene rather than surgery" and noted that for Black doctors, "their duty calls them away from large cities to the village and the plantation".

4. Schools for Negroes. By 1914, the board had made contributions, amounting to $620,105, to schools for Negroes, mainly those for the training of teachers. Anna T. Jeanes had contributed $1,000,000 for that purpose. The schools for Black Americans were often designed to teach rural agricultural skills that would keep them tied to the South and discourage migration to Northern cities. William H. Baldwin gave this advice to Black Americans:
"Learn that any work, however menial, if well done, is dignified; learn that the world will give full credit for labor and success, even though the skin is black; learn that it is a mistake to be educated out of your necessary environment; know that it is a crime for any teacher, white or black, to educate the Negro for positions which are not open to him; know that the greatest opportunity for a successful life lies in the Southland where you were born, where the people know you and need you, and will treat you far better than in any other section of the country."

The work of the General Education Board had a social side as well. “Corn” and educative clubs to study house management, poultry, preservation of fruit and other subjects directly related with agricultural life were encouraged in various ways, more especially in connection with the girl's clubs. Other clubs of a purely social nature were organized for the promotion of more social life in farming communities.

The investigations which preceded the gifts of the Board were perhaps of as great importance to the development of education in the United States as the gifts themselves. The Board consisted of 17 members and maintained headquarters in New York City. In 1920 the president was Wallace Buttrick, and the secretary, Abraham Flexner.

== Implications ==
The General Education Board emphasized the need for real world applicational skills. Two areas which the General Education Board highlighted was Demonstrative Farming as well as Industrial Education. Wallace Buttrick an influential member in the development of the General Education Board highlighted that, "the fundamental problem of the South is the recovery of the fertility of the soil". For this reason as well, the lack of literacy and overall knowledge on modern farming techniques the General Education Board implemented interactive learning techniques rather than "how-to manuals". Because these demonstrations were so effective at informing white and black farmers at the time, the General Education Board invested in committees which were more willing to build/sponsor programs which provided vocational and nonvocational information. Education in a time of racial discrimination became vehicles for African American empowerment. Because of the discriminatory philosophy of the time, African Americans were granted limited knowledge in the realm of industrial training. In most cases information ranged from basic skills to learning strong working habits, which in most cases was nowhere close to the information needed to obtain higher learning. However, because of this learning African Americans were able to secure better jobs, teach others industrial learning, and receive higher training to pursue increase educations.

== Future ==
The work done by the General Education Board paved the way for philanthropic foundations which provided financial grants throughout the American south. These funds were distributed in areas to stimulate the growth of educational practices and bring men and women from all over the country to "promote enlightened and sympathetic understanding of the South’s educational problems following the Reconstruction period".

- Peabody Fund (1867)
- Slater Fund (1882)
- Anna T. Jeanes Foundation (1907)
- Jeanes Teachers
- Julius Rosenwald Fund (1917)
- Phelps-Stokes Fund

== Philosophy ==
The educational philosophy associated with rural schooling initiatives supported by the General Education Board emphasized practical education adapted to rural communities and their existing ways of life. Frederick T. Gates discussed this approach in *The Country School of To-morrow* (1913), describing a model of education focused on improving rural life through schools and community activities.

General Education Board, Occasional Papers, No. 1 "The country school of to-morrow" (General Education Board, New York, 1913) p. 6.

== See also ==
- Philanthropy in the United States
- Rockefeller family
- Rockefeller Foundation
- John D. Rockefeller Jr.
