= Hollis B. Frissell =

Second president of Hampton Institute (1852–1917)

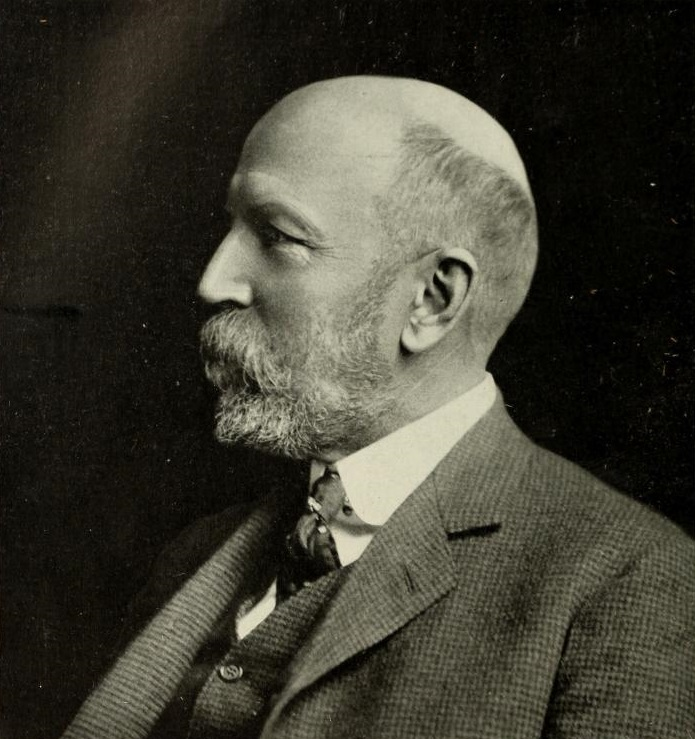

Hollis Burke Frissell (July 14, 1852 – August 5, 1917) was an American chaplain and college president. He served as the second president of Hampton Institute.

== Career ==
He served as the school's chaplain, vice-principal, and then principal until his death in 1917. He was also part of the General Education Board, Southern Education Board, Negro Rural School Fund, Anna T. Jeanes Foundation, Calhoun Colored School, Penn Normal, Industrial and Agricultural School, Virginia Manual Labor School for the Negro Reformatory Association of Virginia, Mandingo Association, and served as president of the New York Colonization Society. He corresponded with W. E. B. DuBois, Arthur Curtiss James, Kelly Miller, George Foster Peabody, John D. Rockefeller, President Theodore Roosevelt, and President William Howard Taft.

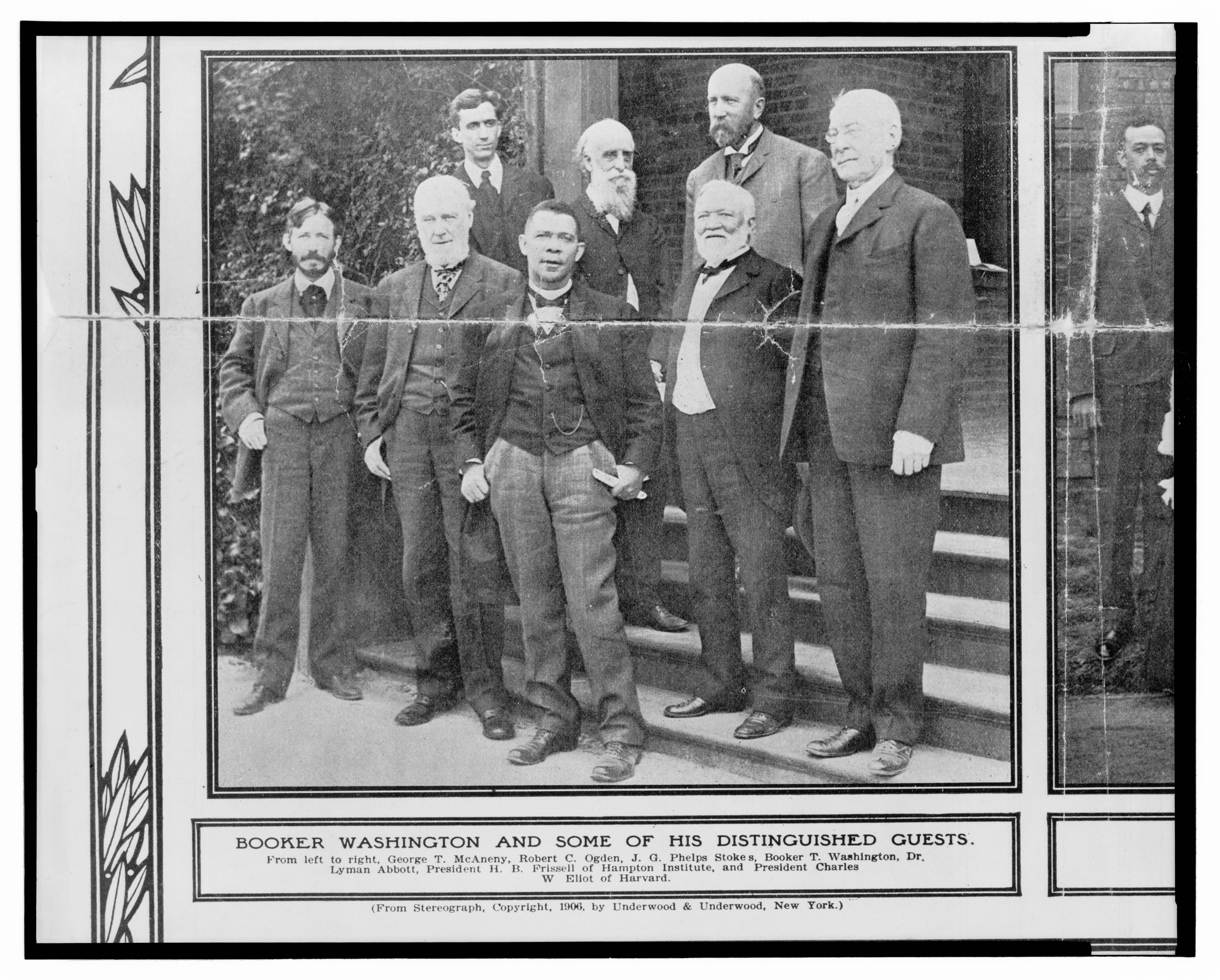
With Booker Washington and other dignitaries

== Personal life ==
He married Julia Frame in 1883 and they had one son.

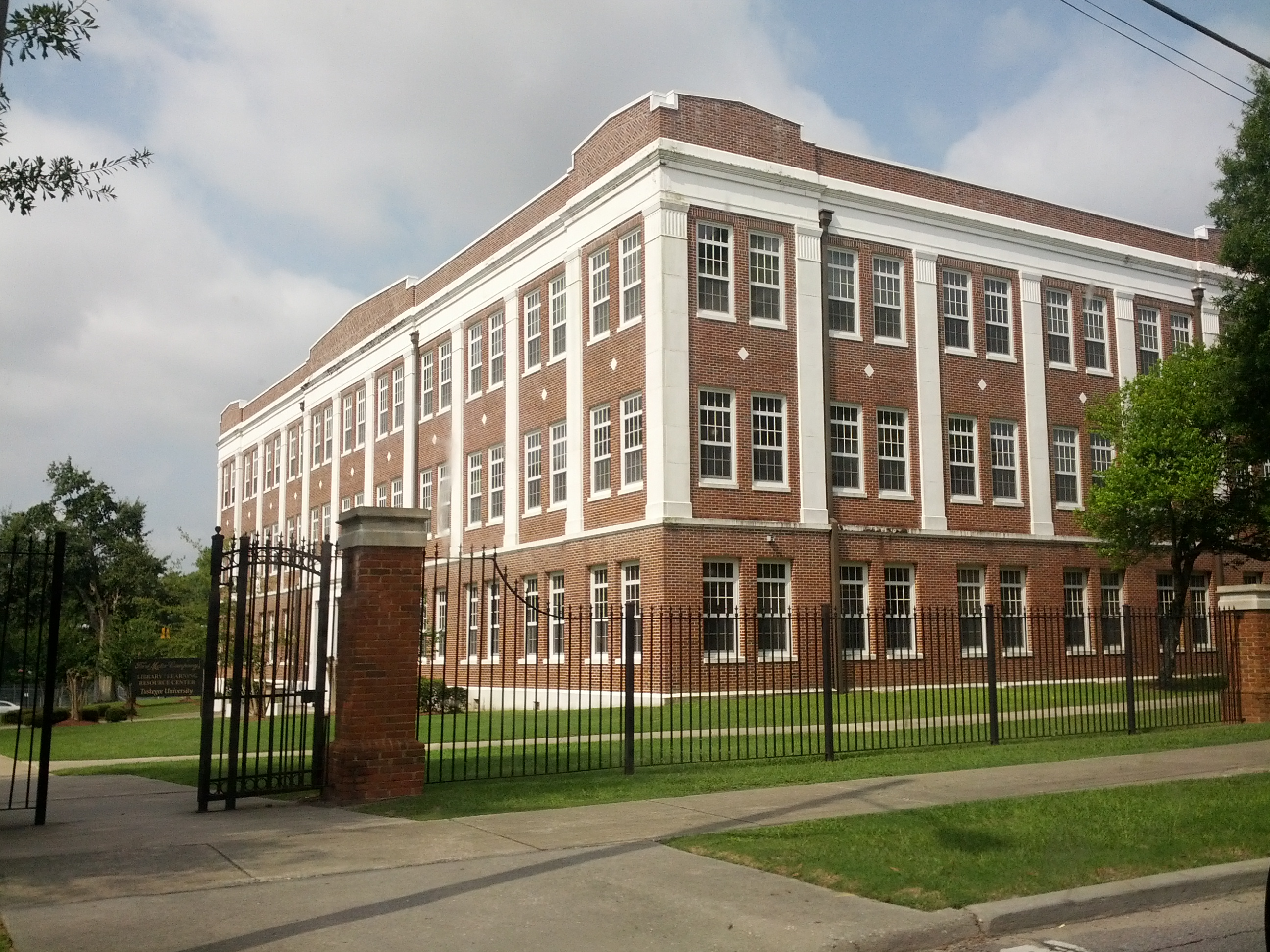
Ford Motor Company Library/Learning Resource Center, post renovation and expansion on the 1932 Hollis Burke Frissell Library

A library at the Tuskegee Institute built in 1932 was named for him. It was eventually renovated and renamed the Ford Motor Company Library.

The Museum of Modern Art has a platinum print photograph of Frissell. He is depicted in a frieze by Evelyn Beatrice Longman at the Smithsonian Institution.
