= Slater Fund =

The John F. Slater Fund for the Education of Freedmen was a financial endowment established in 1882 by John Fox Slater for education of African Americans in the Southern United States. It ceased independent operation in 1937, by which time it had disbursed about $4,000,000.

== Establishment ==
John Fox Slater, founder of the fund

In May 1882 Slater transferred $1,000,000 to a board of trustees incorporated by the State of New York. The fund's stated purpose was "uplifting the lately emancipated population of the Southern States and their posterity by conferring on them the blessings of Christian education." The Peabody Education Fund established in 1867 was restricted to support existing schools in the South (by definition for whites only, as no public schools for freedmen existed before the Civil War and public schools were limited after Reconstruction.) Instead, the Slater Fund contributed to schools which provided the education of colored students. The majority of blacks still lived in rural areas and had to attend segregated public schools, which were typically underfunded by the white Democrat-dominated state legislatures. With an economy chiefly based on agriculture, the South was struggling to recover from losses during the American Civil War, and funds for public services were limited.

== Personnel ==
Among the original trustees were Rutherford B Hayes, Morrison R Waite, William E Dodge, Phillips Brooks, Daniel Coit Gilman, Morris Ketchum Jesup and the donor's son, William A. Slater; and among members chosen later were Melville W Fuller, William E Dodge, Jr, Henry Codman Potter, Cleveland H Dodge and Seth Low. In 1909 by careful investment the fund had increased, in spite of expenditures, to more than $1,500,000. Atticus Greene Haygood, Jabez Lamar Monroe Curry, Wallace Buttrick, and James H. Dillard were general agents of the fund.

== Work ==
The fund was of great value in aiding vocational schools in the South, its largest beneficiaries being the Hampton Normal and Agricultural Institute of Hampton, Virginia, the Tuskegee Normal and Industrial Institute of Tuskegee, Alabama, Spelman Seminary in Atlanta, Claflin University in Orangeburg, South Carolina, and Fisk University, in Nashville, Tennessee. At Winston-Salem, North Carolina, is the Slater State Normal and Industrial School, founded in 1892 and named after the founder of the fund; it is now part of Winston-Salem State University. Other state normal schools for African Americans received assistance from the fund, as did some Southern urban school boards. The fund was opposed to liberal education for blacks, believing it would foster discontent.

Through its funding of the Hampton Institute the fund also provided for the annual Hampton Negro Conference held there.

About 1915, the Peabody Education Fund was dissolved, with some of its assets transferred to the Slater Fund.In 1937, the Southern Education Foundation was formed by merging the assets and resources of the Slater Fund, the Negro Rural School Fund, and the Virginia Randolph Fund.

== See also ==
- Rosenwald Fund (1917–48) built many rural schools for African-American children
