= Cora Wilson Stewart =

American educator and activist targeting adult illiteracy (1875–1958)

Cora Wilson Stewart (January 17, 1875 – December 2, 1958) was an American Progressive Era social reformer and educator who is well known for her work to eliminate adult illiteracy. In 1911, Stewart was the first woman to be elected to the position of the president of the Kentucky Education Association. Stewart opened Moonlight School, first in Rowan County, Kentucky and then across the United States, to educate illiterate adults at night in the schools where children studied during the day.

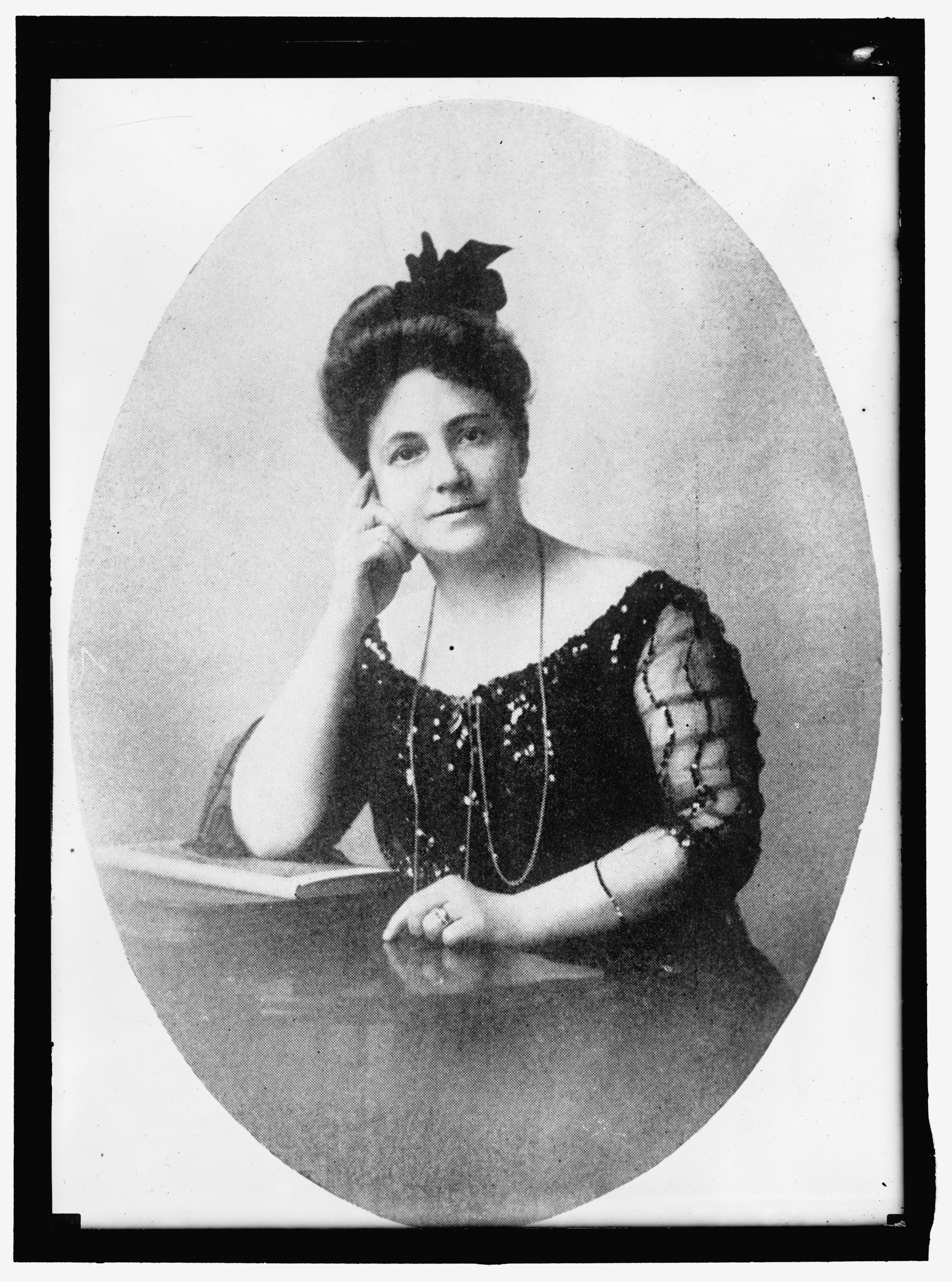

== Family, early life, and education ==
Cora Wilson, the daughter of a physician and a schoolteacher, was born January 17, 1875. Her parents Dr. Jeremiah and Annie Eliza (Hally) Wilson were residents in Rowan County, Kentucky. She achieved her teaching credentials at Morehead Normal School (later Morehead State University) and the University of Kentucky. Stewart began teaching in 1895 at age 20.

Cora Wilson married Ulysses Grant Carey in 1895, and the couple divorced in 1898 with no children. In 1902, she married Alexander Thomas Stewart, son of William G. and Elizabeth (Patton) Stewart. The couple divorced in 1904 but remarried three months later. In 1907, they had their only child, William Holley Stewart who died in 1908. Cora and Alexander divorced on June 8, 1910.

== Moonlight schools ==
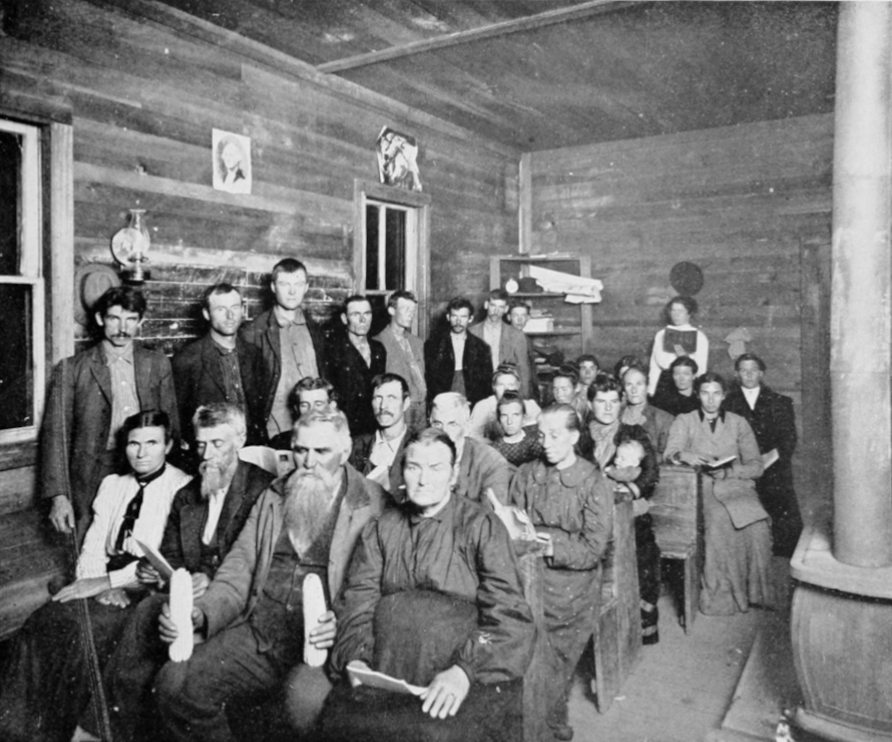
A moonlight school, c. 1916

In 1911, Stewart opened Moonlight School in Rowan County, to educate illiterate Kentucky adults at night in the schools where children studied during the day. In 1914, the state created a commission to extend moonlight schools to all counties. In the following two years, 40,000 Kentuckians were taught to read and write. Similar programs were started in 18 states.
