= Edgar Gardner Murphy =

American clergyman and author

Edgar Gardner Murphy 1869–1913

Edgar Gardner Murphy (1869–1913) was an American clergyman and author during the Progressive Era in the United States who had a conflicted past, working to improve relations between African Americans and whites while also appeasing white nationalists and wrote about issues faced, as well as working to improve child labor laws and public education.

Murphy was born at Fort Smith, Arkansas, graduated from the University of the South at Sewanee in 1889, and served as a priest of the Episcopal Church for twelve years. After 1903, he worked exclusively in educational and social work. Murphy served as executive secretary of the Southern Education Board, vice president of the Conference for Education in the South, organizer and secretary of the Southern Society for Consideration of Race Problems and Conditions in the South, and organizer and first secretary of the National Child Labor Committee.

== Books ==
- Words for the Church (1896)
- The Larger Life (1896)
- Problems of the Present South (1904; second edition, 1909)
- The Basis of Ascendency (1909)
- Up From History, The Life Of Booker T. Washington (2009)

== See also ==
- William Porcher DuBose
