= Anna T. Jeanes =

American philanthropist

Anna T. Jeanes

Anna T. Jeanes (7 April 1822 – 24 September 1907) was an American Quaker philanthropist. She was born in Philadelphia, the city where she gave Spring Garden Institute, a technical school, $5,000,000; $100,000 to the Hicksite Friends; $200,000 to the Quaker schools of Philadelphia; and $200,000 to the Home for Aged Friends, now known as Stapeley in Germantown, a retirement home where she spent the closing years of her life. In 1907 she transferred to the trusteeship of Booker T. Washington and Hollis B. Frissell the sum of $1,000,000 to be known as "the Fund for Rudimentary Schools for Southern Negroes" and to be used exclusively for the benefit of elementary negro schools in the South. The Jeanes Foundation in close cooperation with the General Education Board.

== Personal life ==
Anna Jeanes was the youngest of ten children born to Isaiah and Anna Thomas Jeanes, a Quaker family. "Annie" was four when her mother died of pneumonia. Anna's father and two brothers Samuel and Joshua were merchants. Her brother Joseph owned coal and mineral fields. Her brother Jacob Jeanes was a medical doctor and homeopathic physician who co-founded Homeopathic Medical College of Pennsylvania, later Hahnemann Medical College, the first successful school in the United States to train students in homeopathy and one of the predecessors of the Drexel College of Medicine, where he taught during its first year after opening. Her sister Mary was a philanthropist and abolitionist. All of her siblings died childless. Anna never married and at 72 inherited the family's fortune which she was determined to give away to better humanity. She did that over the next 13 years of her life.

== Philanthropy ==
=== Retirement Communities ===
Unwilling to live alone at the family home Anna built a boarding home “for aged Friends and those in sympathy with us.” The first was built at 1708 Race Street. Not satisfied with one, she personally supervised and carefully monitored the finances and building of a second named Stapeley in the Germantown neighborhood of Philadelphia into which she moved in.

=== Education ===
A few months prior to her death, Anna prepaid an endowment fund, later renamed the Jeanes Fund, to assist community, county, and rural schools for “colored people” in the southern states. Her requirement was that there would be a racially integrated foundation board, the men to be chosen by Booker T. Washington (Tuskegee) and Hollis Frissell (Hampton). Washington and Frissell traveled to Philadelphia to receive the $1,000,000 check. Besides Booker T. Washington directors of The Jeanes Fund included President William H. Taft, Andrew Carnegie, and George Peabody. The fund educated and hired black teachers and traveling supervisors for rural schools, and improved African American school facilities. The "Jeanes teachers" traveled the South, providing vital support for the education of black students. In 1937 the group merged with several charities sharing similar missions, and became the Southern Education Foundation.

=== Care for the Sick ===
Driven by personal experiences and living with a painful diagnosis of carcinoma scrofulous of the breast, Anna left a generous bequest to build a hospital. Her desire was to establish a hospital specializing in cancer, nervous, and disabling ailments. Jeanes Hospital was established on land that had been the Jeanes family farm in Fox Chase. Following WWII, Jeanes Hospital became an acute care general hospital. Later, consistent with Anna's will, the Institute for Cancer Research and American Oncologic Hospital relocated to the Jeanes campus. These two institutions merged to become Fox Chase Cancer Center. Today, Jeanes Hospital and Fox Chase Cancer Center are members of the Temple University Health System.

=== Disenfranchised ===
Concerned by the burdens of life experienced by immigrants, the marginalized, and those forgotten by society, Anna provided funds to the following: the Houses of Industry; the Penn Asylum for Widows and Single Women; Homes for Destitute Colored Children; Homes for the Aged and Infirm Colored Persons; Firemen's Pension Fund; Pennsylvania Working and Industrial Homes for Blind Men; Pennsylvania Society to Prevent Cruelty to Children; Sanitarium Association of Philadelphia (for sick children); Spring Garden Institute; soup kitchens; and children's nurseries.

== Jeanes Hospital ==
Jeanes Hospital is an acute care community hospital located in the Fox Chase section of Northeast Philadelphia. In 1996, Jeanes Hospital became part of the Temple University Health System. The hospital was founded in 1928, through a provision in the will of Anna T. Jeanes, who created an endowment for the establishment of a hospital for "Cancerous, Nervous, and Disabling Ailments." She maintained a home on the grounds that are now the Jeanes Hospital campus.

In 2019 Pennsylvania Historical Commission awarded a historical marker on the grounds of Jeanes Hospital.

== Notes ==
- Bernet, Claus (2011). "Anna T. Jeanes". In Bautz, Traugott (ed.). Biographisch-Bibliographisches Kirchenlexikon (BBKL) (in German). Vol. 32. Nordhausen: Bautz. cols. 740–742. ISBN 978-3-88309-615-5.
- Chirhart, Ann Short (January 20, 2006). "Jeanes Teachers". New Georgia Encyclopedia.
- "The Women Who Ran the Schools", a history exhibit from Durham County Library
