= Southern Education Foundation =

Southern Education Foundation (SEF)
- Formation: 1937
- Founder: Merged from Peabody Education Fund, John F. Slater Fund, Negro Rural School Fund, and Virginia Randolph Fund
- Type: Not-for-profit foundation
- Purpose: Promotion of quality education for disadvantaged students
- Region served: Alabama, Arkansas, Florida, Georgia, Kentucky, Louisiana, Maryland, Mississippi, North Carolina, Oklahoma, South Carolina, Tennessee, Texas, Virginia, West Virginia
- Website: Official Website

The Southern Education Foundation (SEF) is a not-for-profit foundation created in 1937 from four different funds — the Peabody Education Fund, the John F. Slater Fund, the Negro Rural School Fund, and the Virginia Randolph Fund. The main goal of the foundation is to promote quality education for traditionally disadvantaged students, including the poor and African Americans. SEF provides research, policy analysis and programming in Alabama, Arkansas, Florida, Georgia, Kentucky, Louisiana, Maryland, Mississippi, North Carolina, Oklahoma, South Carolina, Tennessee, Texas, Virginia, and West Virginia.

Raymond C. Pierce is the current president.

The phrase "Southern Education Foundation: Since 1867" refers to the Foundation's evolution from the Peabody Education Fund. Founded of necessity due to damage caused largely by the American Civil War, the Peabody Education Fund was established by George Peabody in 1867.
