= Wallace Buttrick =

American Baptist minister (1853–1926)

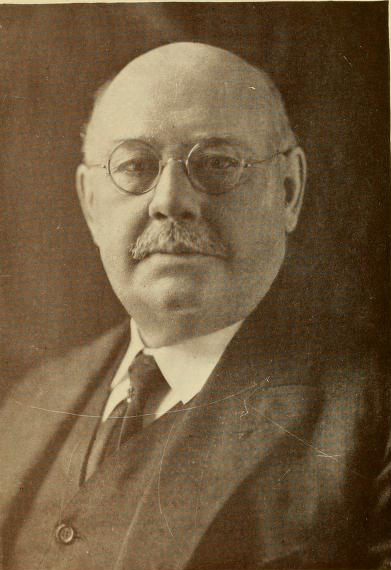
Buttrick, c. 1922

Wallace Buttrick (October 23, 1853 – May 28, 1926) was an American Baptist minister who served as secretary (1903–1917), president (1917–1923), and chairman (1923–1926) of the General Education Board, and as a trustee of the Rockefeller Foundation (1917–1926). Wallace Buttrick believed that schools, teachers, and institutions were not necessary for education however, for those who were less fortunate this served as the only medium for learning. The academic and administrative building Buttrick Hall at Agnes Scott College is named in Buttrick's honor. He is cited as a friend of the college, the opening of Buttrick Hall was celebrated May 30, 1930.

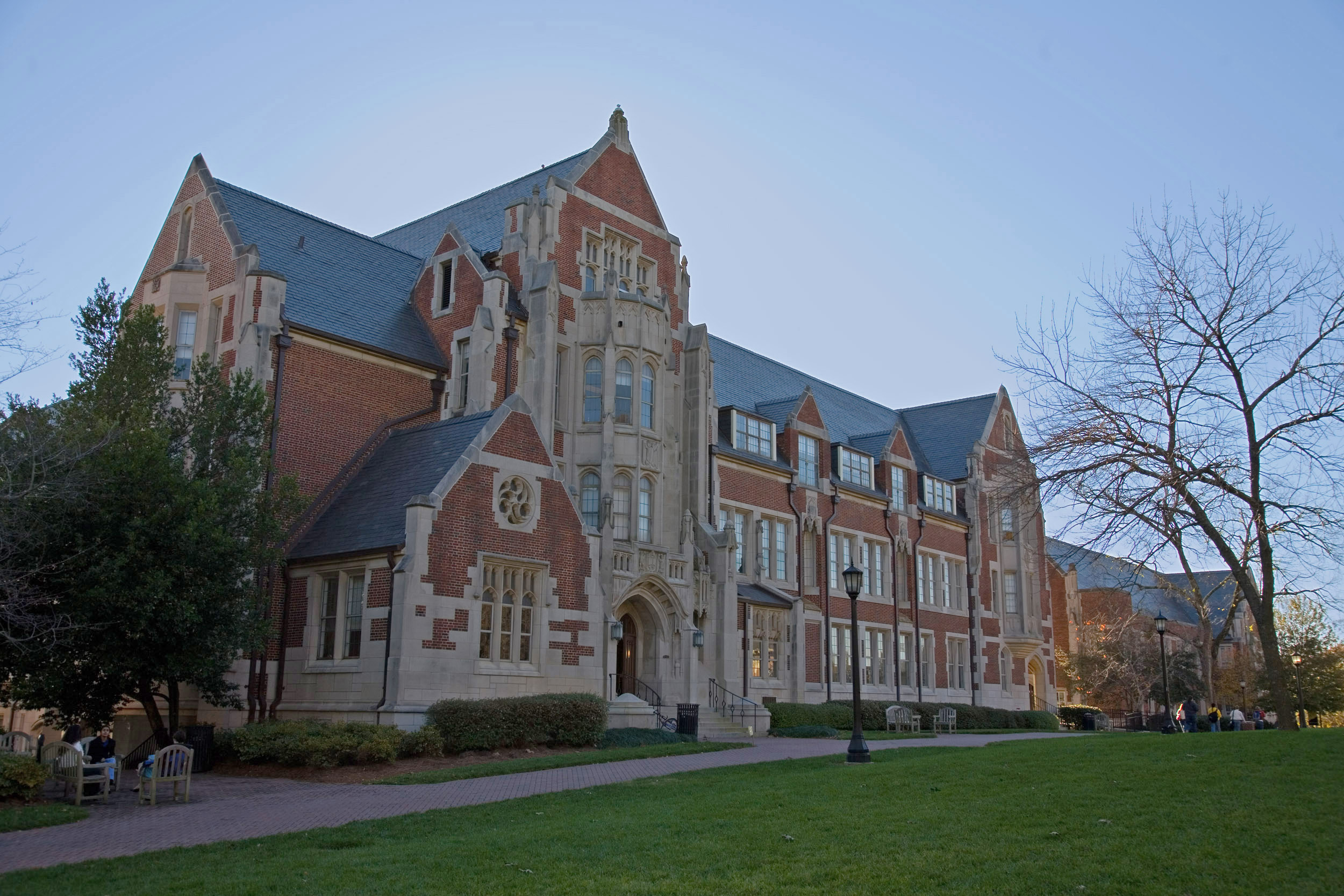
Buttrick Hall at Agnes Scott College in Decatur, Georgia. Completed in 1930 by Bruce and Morgan

Buttrick was born in Potsdam, New York on October 23, 1853. He died in Baltimore, Maryland on May 28, 1926 at the age of 72.

== General Education Board ==
Wallace Buttrick, Secretary of the GEB, played a significant role in not only funding the General Board of Education but as well the reason for education.
