= Peabody Education Fund =

Southern American educational fund

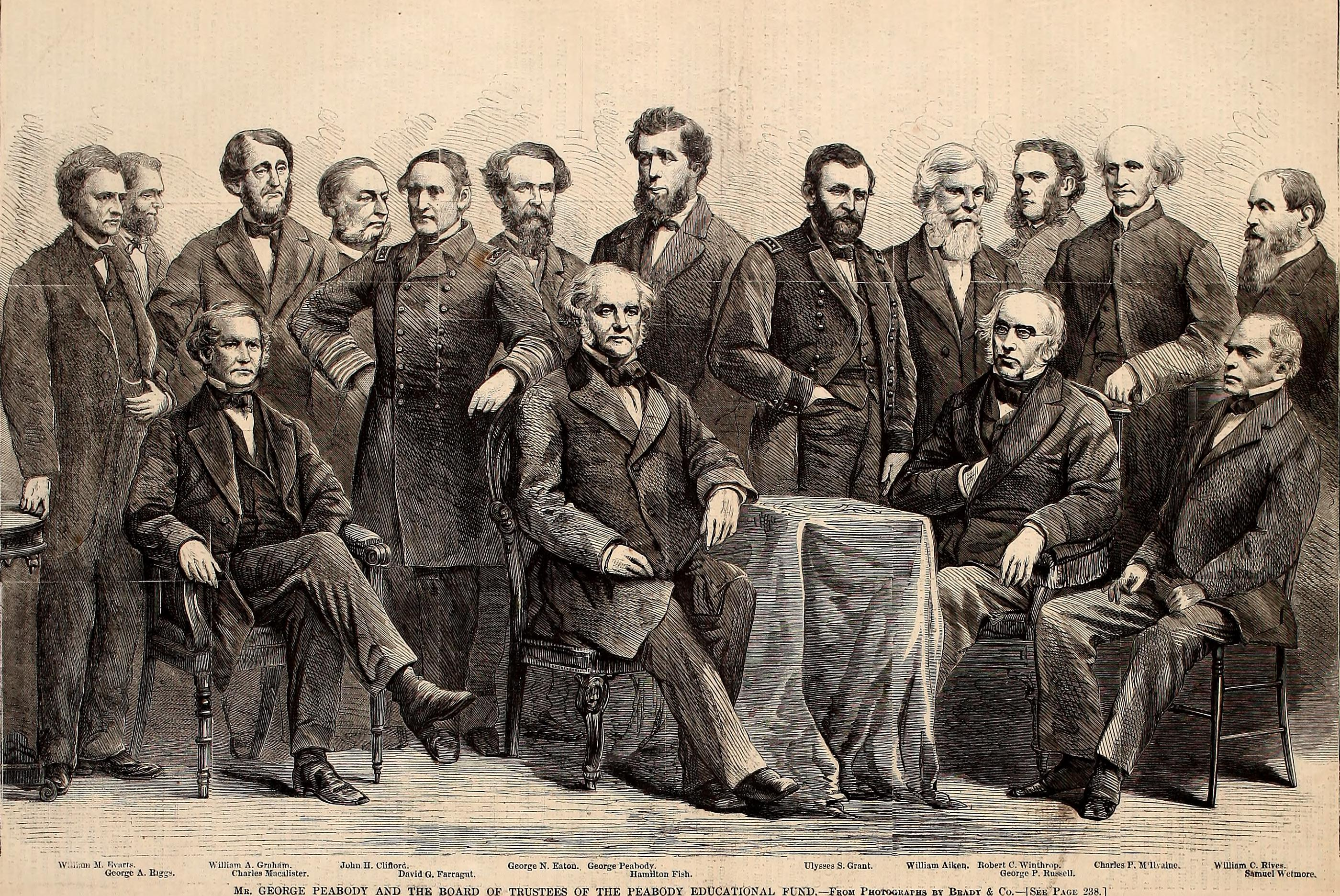
George Peabody and the board of trustees of the Peabody Educational Trust

The Peabody Education Fund was established by George Peabody in 1867, after the American Civil War, for the purpose of promoting "intellectual, moral, and industrial education in the most destitute portion of the Southern States." The main purpose of the fund was to aid elementary education by strengthening existing schools. Because it was restricted from founding new schools, it largely did not benefit freedmen in the South; only 6.5% of its disbursements went to schools for Black students in its early years. The gift of foundation consisted of securities to the value of $2,100,000, of which $1,100,000 were in Mississippi State bonds, afterward repudiated.

The original trustees of 1867 were William M. Ewarts; George A. Riggs; William Alexander Graham; Charles MacAlister; John H. Clifford; David G. Farragut; George N. Eaton; George Peabody; Hamilton Fish; Ulysses S. Grant; William Aiken Jr.; Robert C. Winthrop; George P. Russell; Charles P. McIlvaine; William C. Rives; Samuel Wetmore. In 1869 an additional $1,000,000 was given by Mr. Peabody, with $384,000 of Florida funds, also repudiated later.

"The fund introduced a new type of benefaction in that it was left without restriction in the hands of the trustees to administer. Power to close the trust after thirty years was provided on condition that two-thirds of the fund be distributed to educational institutions in the Southern states."

The rules of the Peabody Education Fund were strict, allowing for the distribution of about $80,000 per year over a period of thirty years. By the time of the termination of the fund in 1898, about $2,500,000 had been distributed. In 1875, the trustees of the Peabody Education Fund founded the Peabody Normal School of the South which promptly became the Peabody Normal College (1875-1911). It was maintained in connection with the University of Nashville and supported by annual donations from the Peabody Education Fund. In 1910 the Peabody College for Teachers was organized. Placed adjacent to Vanderbilt University, the college opened its doors on June 14, 1914 for summer school. In September 1915, four new buildings had been completed at a cost of $750,000. The Peabody Education Fund was dissolved in 1914.

The Southern Education Foundation, a not-for-profit foundation, was created in 1937 from the Peabody Education Fund and three funds intended to support education for blacks: the John F. Slater Fund, the Negro Rural School Fund, and the Virginia Randolph Fund.
