= Jeanes Foundation =

Fund for African American rural education

- Negro Rural School Fund
- Nickname: Jeanes Fund
- Named after: Anna T. Jeanes
- Formation: November 20, 1907
- Founder: Anna T. Jeanes
- Dissolved: 1968
- Type: Non-profit foundation
- Legal status: Defunct
- Purpose: To improve educational opportunities for rural African Americans
- Professional title: Jeanes Teacher, Supervising Industrial Teacher, Jeanes Agent, Jeanes Supervisor
- Region served: Southern United States
- Services: Funding for teachers and schools
- Fields: Education, Philanthropy
- President: James Hardy Dillard
- Board of directors: William Howard Taft, Andrew Carnegie, Booker T. Washington, Hollis B. Frissell, et al.
- Key people: Virginia Estelle Randolph
- Publication: The Henrico Plan (authored by Virginia Randolph)
- Parent organization: Southern Education Foundation (after 1937 merger)
- Endowment: $1,000,000 (initial endowment by Anna T. Jeanes) (1907)

The Jeanes Foundation, also known as the Negro Rural School Fund or Jeanes Fund, helped support education and vocational programs for African American in rural communities from 1908 to the 1960s. It was founded by Anna T. Jeanes with help from Booker T. Washington in 1907 and ran until 1968.

== About ==
The Jeanes Foundation supplied the structure and the method to hire teachers for African Americans in rural communities. Teachers in the program were called supervising industrial teachers, Jeanes supervisors, Jeanes agents, or Jeanes teachers. These teachers had a broad latitude to decide what areas to focus on in their individual communities. It was also understood that community needs were different and teachers' methods would vary. Supervising teachers also worked to raise money for schools, school equipment and to extend the teaching year. Supervising teachers were chosen by county superintendents.

== History ==
The foundation was the idea of Anna T. Jeanes, an American philanthropist and Quaker who wanted to establish a fund to improve the educational opportunities of rural African-Americans. Jeanes had been in contact with Booker T. Washington of Tuskegee Institute and Hollis B. Frissell, principal of the Hampton Institute, who had discussed with her the importance of funding education for African-Americans. Jeanes was interested in providing assistance for people in rural areas, saying, "I should like to help the little country schools." Jeanes asked Washington to help her set up a foundation for this purpose. Washington helped create a board of trustees for the program and Jeanes endowed the organization with $1,000,000 to create the Jeanes Foundation, also known as the Negro Rural School Fund or sometimes just Jeanes Fund which was incorporated on November 20, 1907. After Jeanes died, her will specified that William Howard Taft, Andrew Carnegie, Washington and Frissell be named to the Board of Trustees for the foundation. At the time, the Jeanes Foundation was the only educational foundation to have black members of the board. The president of the fund was James Hardy Dillard. The board first met on February 29, 1908.

Soon, the board began to receive requests for funding from county superintendents of black schools. Jackson Davis, the superintendent of Henrico County Public Schools near Richmond, Virginia, requested funds for an "industrial supervisor" who would teach both vocational and academic skills at rural schools. In 1908, Davis, named Virginia Estelle Randolph as the first "Jeanes Supervising Industrial Teacher." Randolph created the first program for the Jeanes teachers to improve education in their communities. As the overseer of 23 elementary schools in Henrico County, Randolph developed the first in-service training program for black teachers and worked on improving the curriculum of the schools. With the freedom to design her own agenda, she shaped industrial work and community self-help programs to meet specific needs of schools. She chronicled her progress by becoming the author of the Henrico Plan, which became a reference book for southern schools receiving assistance from the Jeanes Foundation, which became known as the Negro Rural School Fund. Randolph was paid $40.00 a month for her work.

The Southern Education Foundation, a not-for-profit foundation, was created in 1937 from the Negro Rural School Fund, the John F. Slater Fund, the Peabody Education Fund, and the Virginia Randolph Fund.

In the 1960s, the Jeanes teachers and their students were integrated into public schools. The program continued until 1968.
