= 1924 Democratic National Convention =

U.S. political event held in Madison Square Garden in New York City

- 1924 presidential election
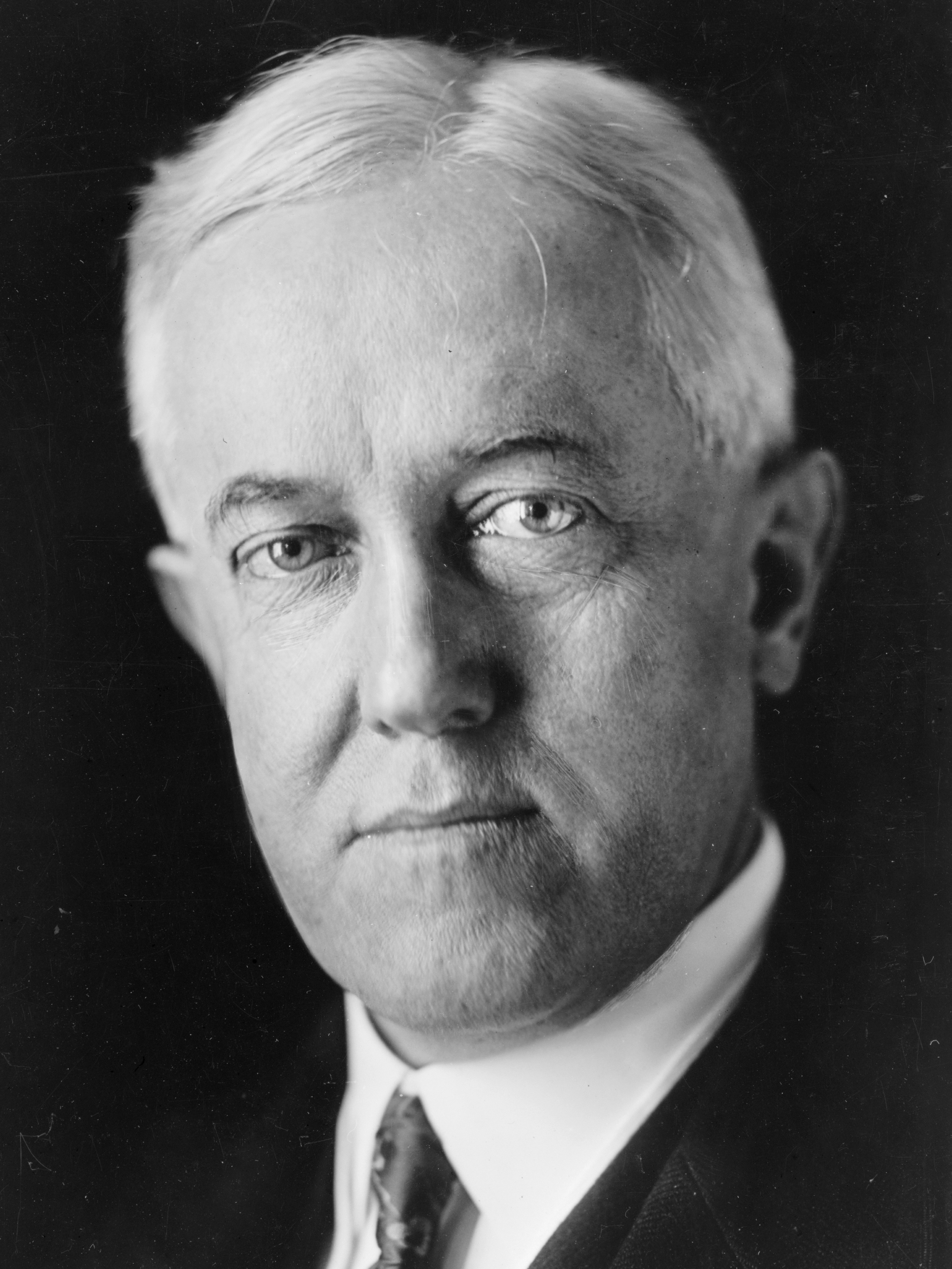
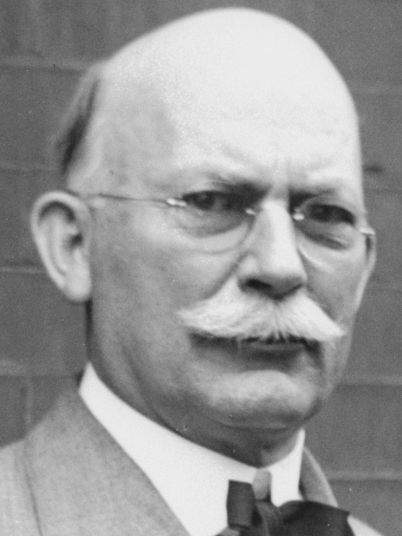
- Nominees; Davis and Bryan

Convention
- Dates: June 24 – July 9, 1924
- City: New York, New York
- Venue: Madison Square Garden

Candidates
- Presidential nominee: John W. Davis of West Virginia
- Vice-presidential nominee: Charles W. Bryan of Nebraska

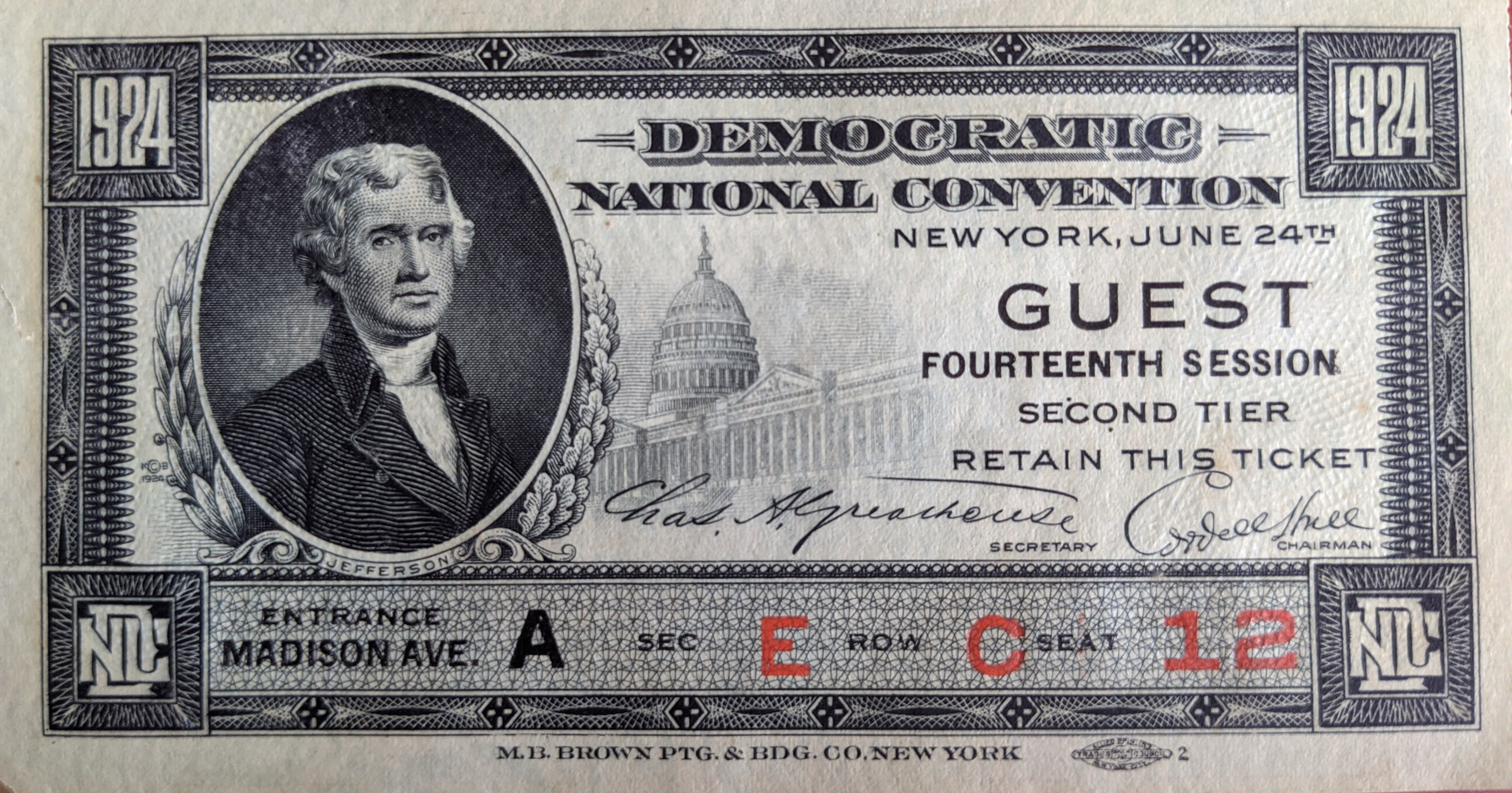

The 1924 Democratic National Convention, held at the Madison Square Garden in New York City from June 24 to July 9, 1924, was the longest continuously running convention in United States political history. It took a record 103 ballots to nominate a presidential candidate. It was the first major party national convention that saw the name of a woman, Lena Springs, placed in nomination for vice president. John W. Davis, a dark horse, eventually won the presidential nomination on the 103rd ballot, a compromise candidate following a protracted convention fight between distant front-runners William Gibbs McAdoo and Al Smith.

Davis and his vice presidential running-mate, Governor Charles W. Bryan of Nebraska, went on to be defeated by the Republican ticket of President Calvin Coolidge and Charles G. Dawes in the 1924 presidential election.

== Site selection ==
New York had not been chosen for a convention since 1868, and its selection as the site for the 1924 convention was based in part on the state party's recent success. Two years earlier, thirteen Republican congressmen had lost their seats to Democrats. Wealthy New Yorkers, who had outbid other cities, declared their purpose "to convince the rest of the country that the town was not the red-light menace generally conceived by the sticks". Though "dry" organizations that supported continuing the prohibition of alcohol opposed the choice, in the fall of 1923 it won the grudging consent of McAdoo, a dry, before McAdoo's connection to the Teapot Dome scandal made Smith a serious threat. (McAdoo's candidacy was hurt by the revelation that he had accepted money from Edward L. Doheny, an oil tycoon implicated in Teapot Dome.) McAdoo's adopted state, California, had played host to the Democrats in 1920.

== Logistics ==
The convention was the first Democratic National Convention to have its proceedings broadcast on radio. Millions across the United States heard the broadcasts.

Despite very heated disputes arising among delegates to the convention, political violence was mostly averted. The New York Herald Tribune reported, "there was no bloodshed only because 1,000 New York policemen had been sent there to preserve order in a convention, the leaders of which believed was going to become a riot." Nevertheless, there were some instances of violence, such as a convention floor fistfight in which Colorado Governor William Ellery Sweet was knocked to the ground and stepped on. Amid this fight, the convention chairman pounded his gavel so furiously in attempting to call for order, that he accidentally caused the head of his gavel to break off and fly into the head of a man (who consequentially suffered a concussion).

== The primaries ==
McAdoo swept the primaries in the first real race in the history of the party, although most states chose delegates through party organizations and conventions, giving most of their projected votes to local or hometown candidates, referred to as "favorite sons".

== Ku Klux Klan presence ==
External videos
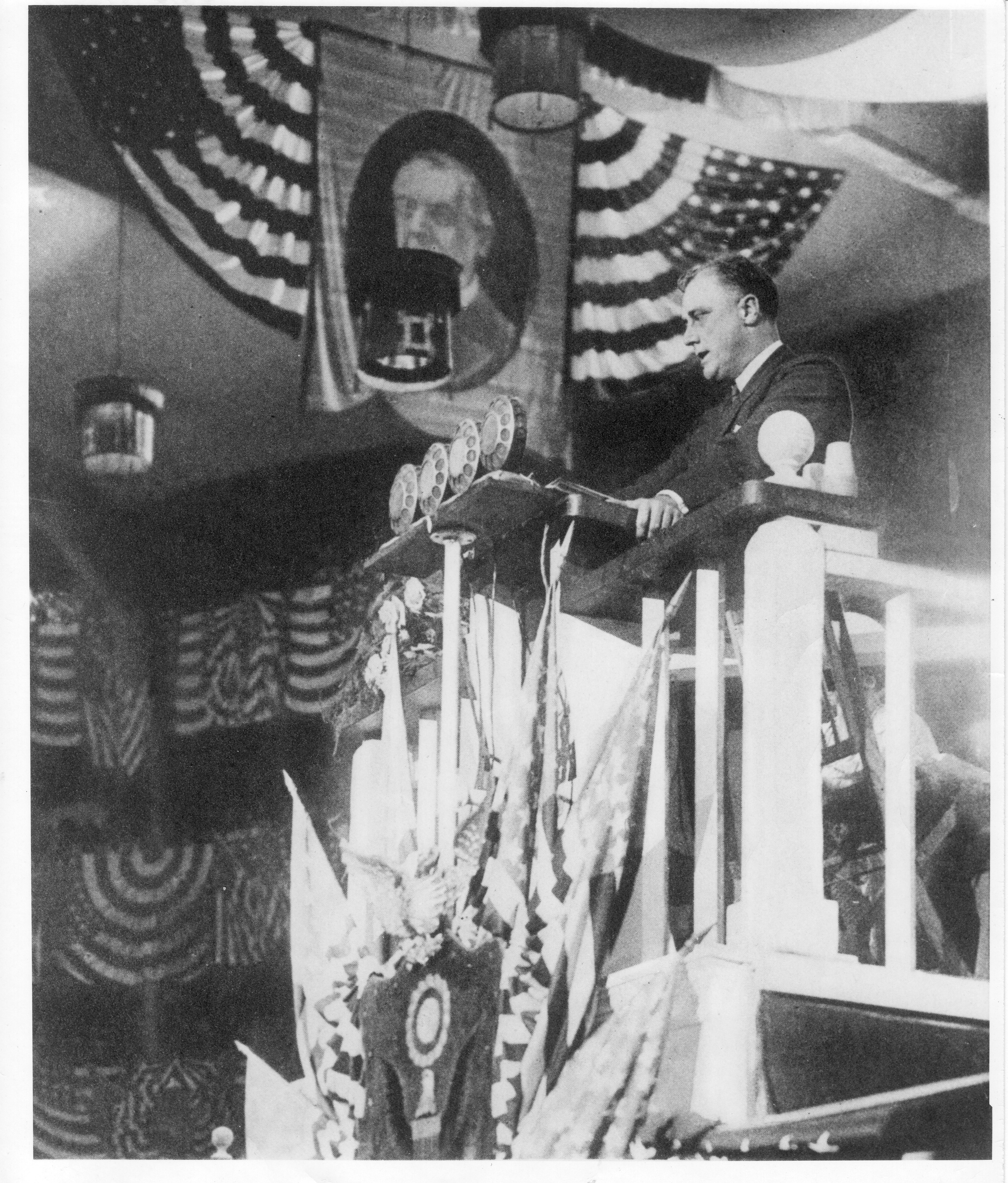
- A Broken Party (1924) Conventional Wisdom, 5:56, 2016, Retro Report

The Ku Klux Klan had surged in popularity after World War I, due to its leadership's connections to passage of the successful Prohibition Amendment to the U.S. Constitution. This made the Klan a political power throughout many regions of the United States, and it reached the apex of its power in the mid-1920s, when it exerted deep cultural and political influence on both Republicans and Democrats. Its supporters had successfully quashed an anti-Klan resolution before it ever went to a floor vote at the 1924 Republican National Convention earlier in June, and proponents expected to exert the same influence at the Democratic convention. Instead, tension between pro- and anti-Klan delegates produced an intense and sometimes violent showdown between convention attendees from the states of Colorado and Missouri. Klan delegates opposed the nomination of New York governor Al Smith because Smith was a Roman Catholic and an opponent of Prohibition, and most supported William Gibbs McAdoo. Non-Klan delegates, led by Sen. Oscar Underwood of Alabama, attempted to add condemnation of the organization for its violence to the Democratic Party's platform. The measure was narrowly defeated, and the anti-KKK plank was not included in the platform.

== Policy disputes ==
Heated policy disputes arose at the convention, dividing delegates. One was the proposed anti-KKK platform plank. Others included disagreements over prohibition and whether the United States should join the League of Nations.

== Roosevelt comeback ==
Smith's name was placed into nomination by Franklin D. Roosevelt, in a speech in which Roosevelt dubbed Smith "The Happy Warrior". Roosevelt's speech, which has since become a well-studied example of political oratory, was his first major political appearance since the paralytic illness he had contracted in 1921. The success of this speech and his other convention efforts in support of Smith signaled that he was still a viable figure in politics, and he nominated Smith again in 1928. Roosevelt succeeded Smith as governor in 1929, and went on to win election as president in 1932.

== Results ==
=== Presidential candidates ===
Former governor
James M. Cox
of Ohio

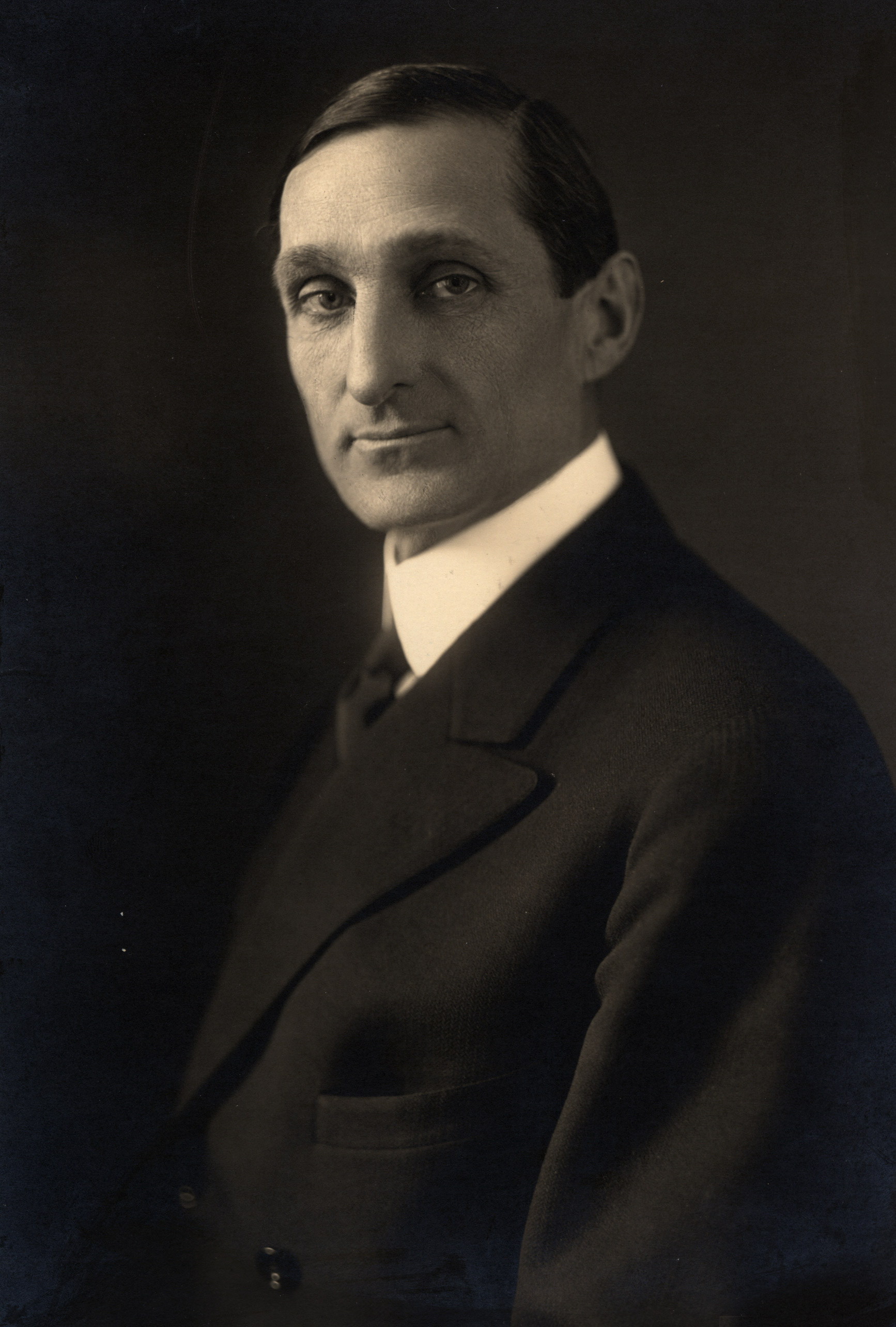
Former Treasury Secretary
William Gibbs McAdoo
of California

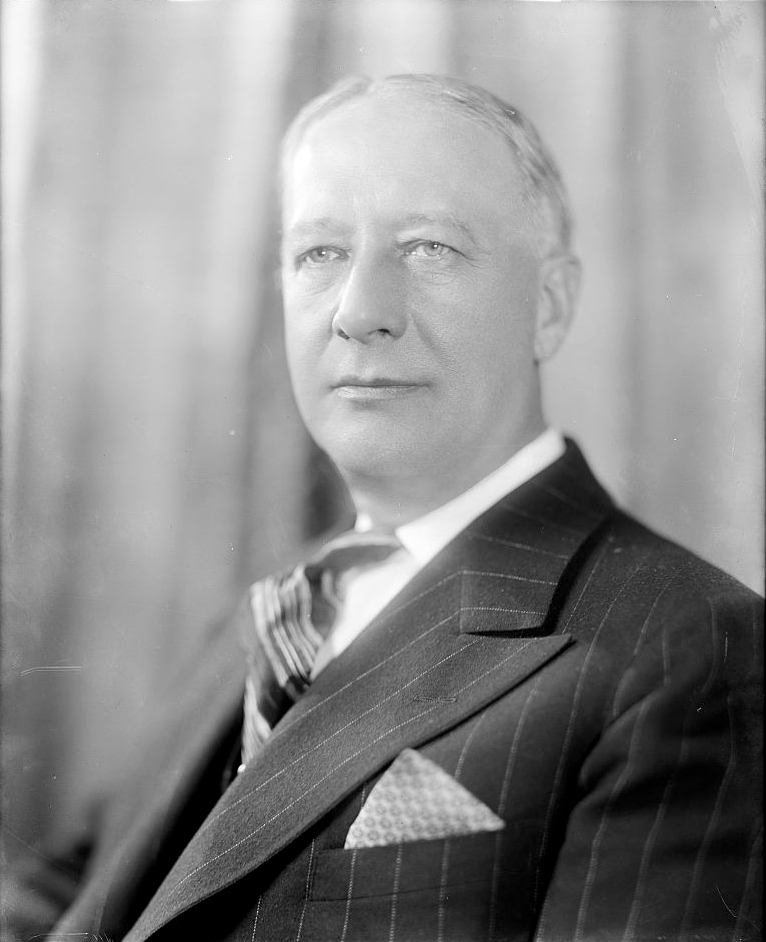
Governor
Al Smith
of New York
(campaign)

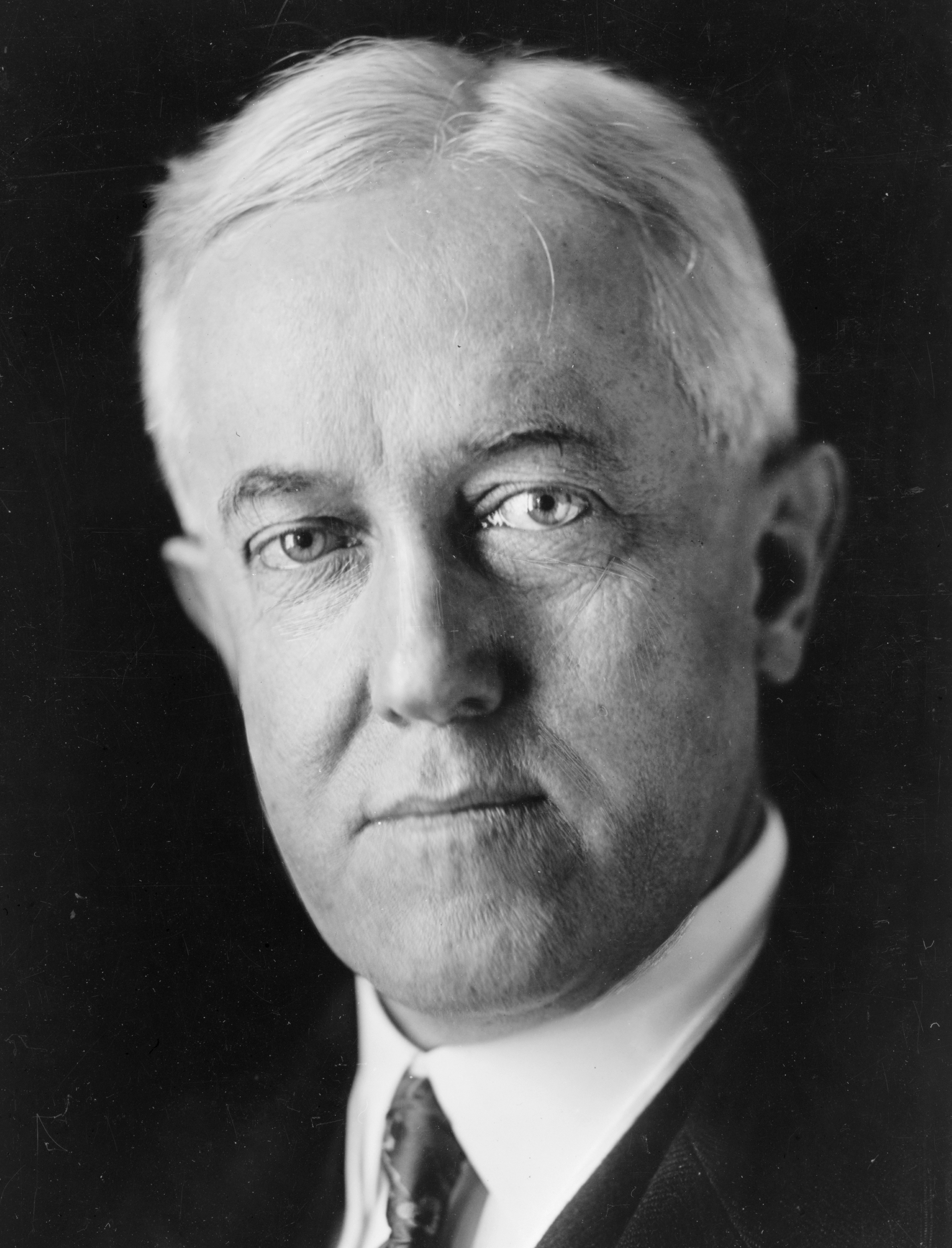
Ambassador
John W. Davis
of West Virginia

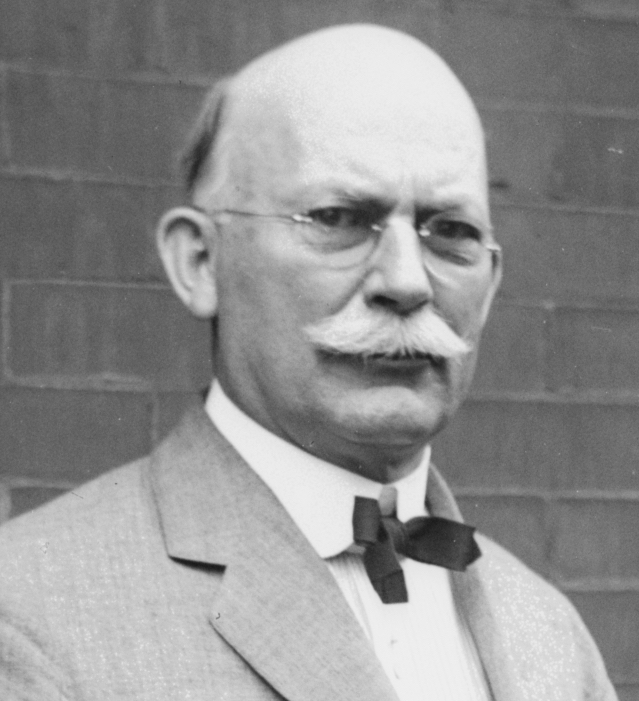
Governor
Charles W. Bryan
of Nebraska

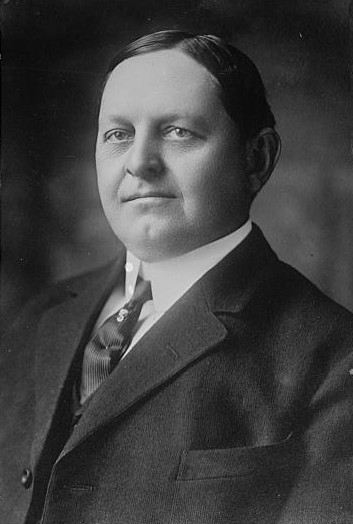
Senator
Oscar Underwood
of Alabama

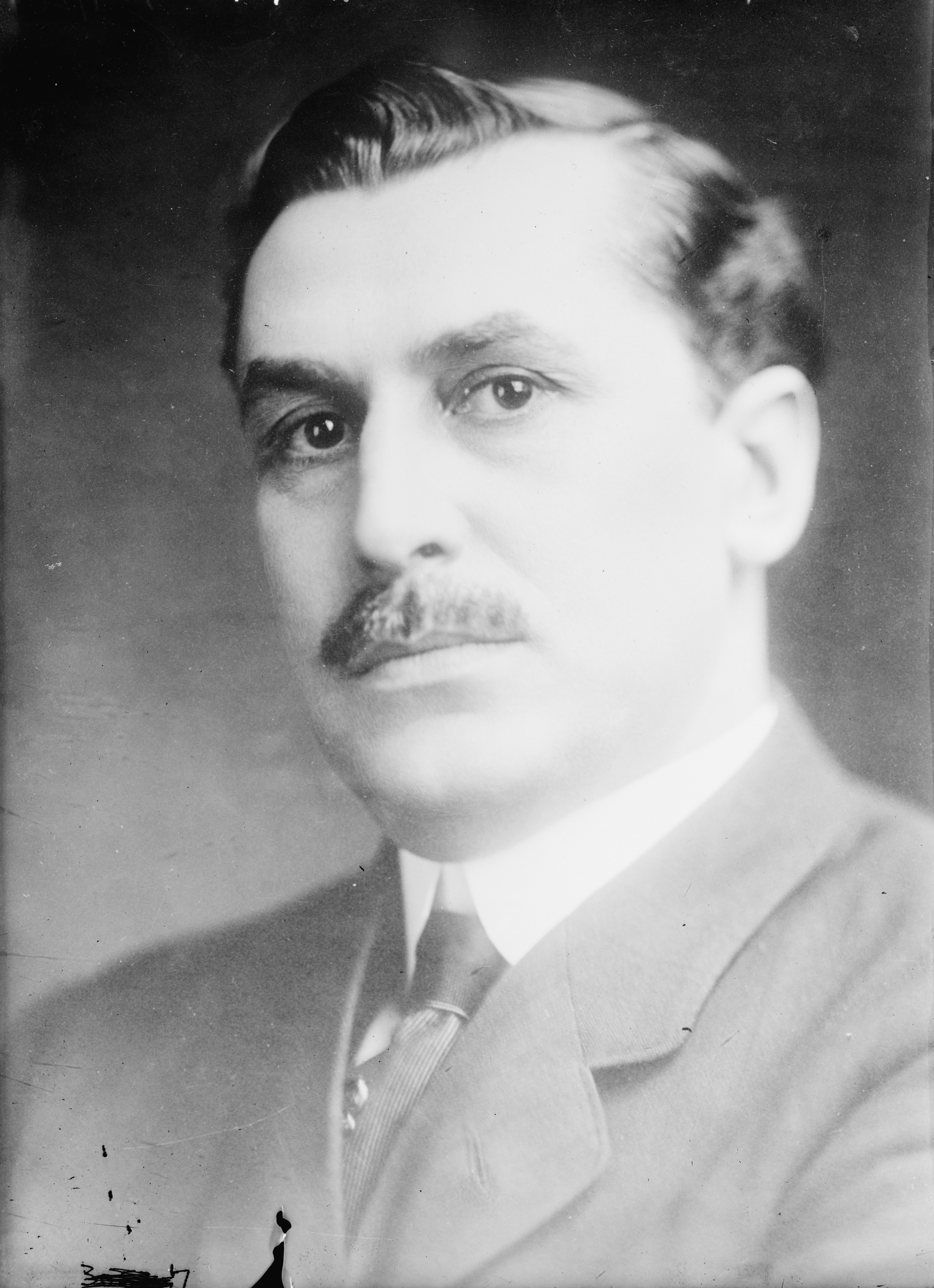
Secretary of Agriculture
Edwin T. Meredith
of Iowa

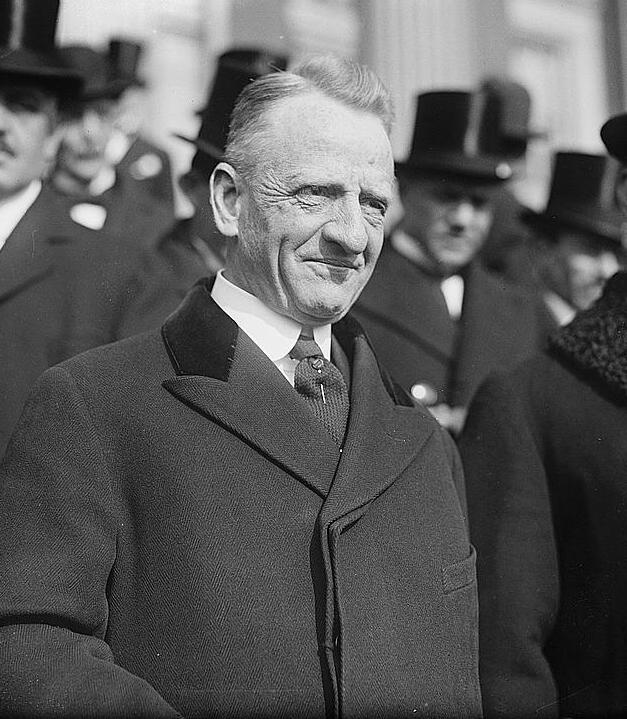
Senator
Carter Glass
of Virginia

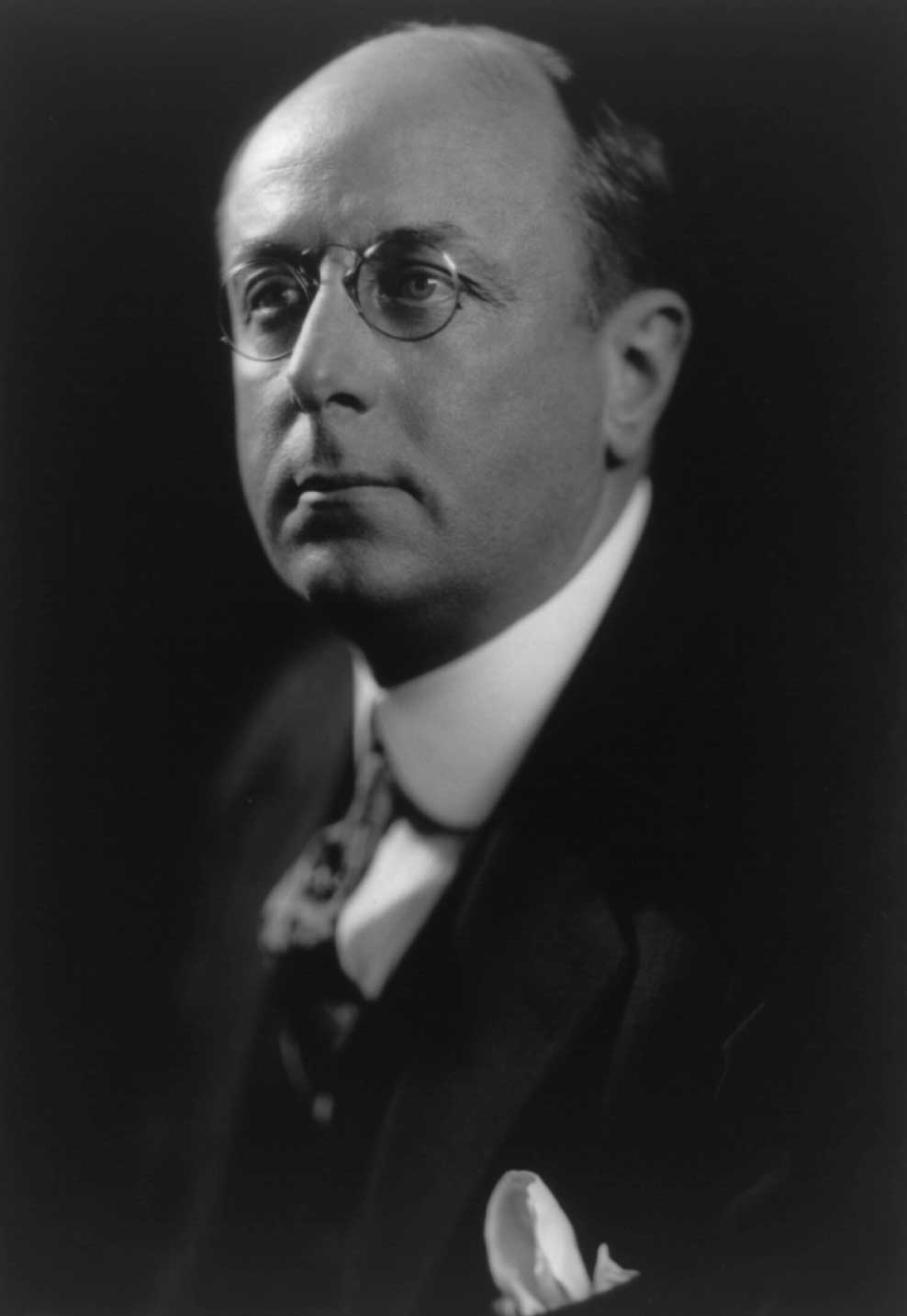
DNC Chairman
Homer S. Cummings
of Connecticut

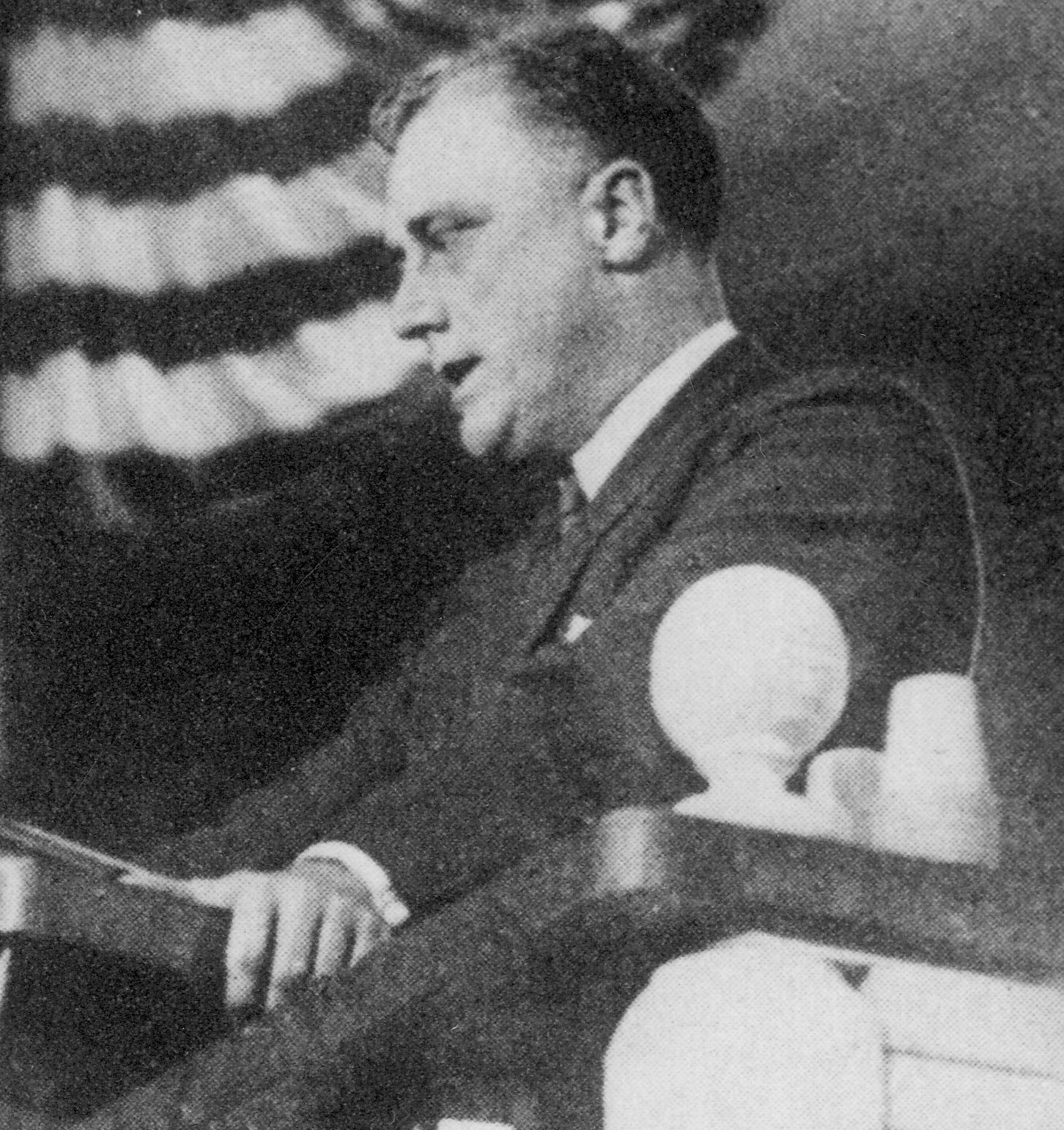
Franklin D. Roosevelt placing Al Smith's name into nomination

The first day of balloting (June 30) brought the predicted deadlock between the leading aspirants for the nomination, William G. McAdoo of California and Gov. Alfred E. Smith of New York, with the remainder divided mainly between local "favorite sons". McAdoo was the leader from the outset, and both he and Smith made small gains in the day's fifteen ballots, but the prevailing belief among the delegates was that the impasse could only be broken by the elimination of both McAdoo and Smith and the selection of one of the other contenders; much interest centred about the candidacy of John W. Davis, who also increased his vote during the day from 31 to 61 (with a peak of 64.5 votes on the 13th and 14th ballots). Most of the favorite son delegations refused to be stampeded to either of the leading candidates and were in no hurry to retire from the contest.

In the early balloting many delegations appeared to be jockeying for position, and some of the original votes were purely complimentary and seemed to conceal the real sentiments of the delegates. Louisiana, for example, which was bound by the "unit rule" (all the state's delegate votes would be cast in favor of the candidate favored by a majority of them), first complimented its neighbor Arkansas by casting its 20 votes for Sen. Joseph T. Robinson, then it switched to Sen. Carter Glass, and on another ballot Maryland Gov. Albert C. Ritchie got the twenty, before the delegation finally settled on John W. Davis.

There was some excitement on the tenth ballot, when Kansas abandoned Gov. Jonathan M. Davis and threw its votes to McAdoo. There was an instant uproar among McAdoo delegates and supporters, and a parade was started around the hall, the Kansas standard leading, with those of all the other McAdoo states coming along behind, and pictures of "McAdoo, Democracy's Hope", being lifted up. After six minutes the chairman's gavel brought order and the roll call resumed, and soon the other side had something to cheer, when New Jersey made its favorite son, Gov. George S. Silzer, walk the plank and threw its votes into the Smith column. This started another parade, the New York and New Jersey standards leading those of the other Smith delegations around the hall while the band played "Tramp, Tramp, Tramp, the Boys are Marching".

==== First ballot ====
Democratic National Convention presidential vote, 1st ballot
Candidate	Votes	Percentage
William G. McAdoo	431.5	39.4%
Alfred E. Smith	241	22.0%
James M. Cox	59	5.4%
Pat Harrison	43.5	4.0%
Oscar W. Underwood	42.5	3.9%
George S. Silzer	38	3.5%
John W. Davis	31	2.8%
Samuel M. Ralston	30	2.7%
Woodbridge N. Ferris	30	2.7%
Carter Glass	25	2.3%
Albert C. Ritchie	22.5	2.1%
Joseph T. Robinson	21	1.9%
Jonathan M. Davis	20	1.8%
Charles W. Bryan	18	1.6%
Fred H. Brown	17	1.6%
William Ellery Sweet	12	1.1%
Willard Saulsbury	7	0.6%
John Kendrick	6	0.5%
Houston Thompson	1	0.1%

==== Fifteenth ballot ====
Democratic National Convention presidential vote, 15th ballot
Candidate	Votes	Percentage
William G. McAdoo	479	43.6%
Alfred E. Smith	305.5	27.8%
John W. Davis	61	5.6%
James M. Cox	60	5.5%
Oscar W. Underwood	39.5	3.6%
Samuel M. Ralston	31	2.8%
Carter Glass	25	2.3%
Pat Harrison	20.5	1.9%
Joseph T. Robinson	20.5	1.9%
Albert C. Ritchie	17.5	1.6%
Jonathan M. Davis	11	1.0%
Charles W. Bryan	11	1.0%
Fred H. Brown	9	0.8%
Willard Saulsbury	6	0.5%
Thomas J. Walsh	1	0.1%
Newton D. Baker	1	0.1%

==== Twentieth ballot ====
McAdoo and Smith each evolved a strategy to build up his own total slowly. Smith's trick was to plant his extra votes for his opponent, so that McAdoo's strength might later appear to be waning; the Californian countered by holding back his full force, though he had been planning a strong early show. But by no sleight of hand could the convention have been swung around to either contestant. With the party split into two assertive parts, the rule requiring a two-thirds vote for nomination crippled the chances of both candidates by giving a veto each could—and did—use. McAdoo himself wanted to drop the two-thirds rule, but his Protestant supporters preferred to keep their veto over a Catholic candidate, and the South regarded the rule as protection against a northern nominee unfavorable to southern interests. At no point in the balloting did Smith receive more than a single vote from the South and scarcely more than 20 votes from the states west of the Mississippi; he never won more than 368 of the 729 votes needed for nomination, though even this performance was impressive for a Roman Catholic. McAdoo's strength fluctuated more widely, reaching its highest point of 528 on the seventieth ballot. Since both candidates occasionally received purely strategic aid, the nucleus of their support was probably even less. The remainder of the votes were divided among dark horses and favorite sons who had spun high hopes since the Doheny testimony; understandably, they hesitated to withdraw their own candidacies as long as the convention was so clearly divided.

Democratic National Convention presidential vote, 20th ballot
Candidate	Votes	Percentage
William G. McAdoo	432	39.5%
Alfred E. Smith	307.5	28.0%
John W. Davis	122	11.3%
Oscar W. Underwood	45.5	4.1%
Samuel M. Ralston	30	2.7%
Carter Glass	25	2.3%
Joseph T. Robinson	21	1.9%
Albert C. Ritchie	17.5	1.6%
Others	97.5	8.6%

==== Thirtieth ballot ====
As time passed, the maneuvers of the two factions took on the character of desperation. Daniel C. Roper even went to Franklin Roosevelt, reportedly to offer Smith second place on a McAdoo ticket. For their part, the Tammany men tried to prolong the convention until the hotel bills were beyond the means of the delegates who had traveled to the convention. The Smith backers also attempted to stampede the delegates by packing the galleries with noisy rooters. Senator James Phelan of California, among others, complained of "New York rowdyism". But the rudeness of Tammany, particularly their delegates' booing of William Jennings Bryan when he spoke to the convention, only steeled the resolution of the country delegates. McAdoo and Bryan both tried unsuccessfully to adjourn and then reconvene in another city, perhaps Washington, D.C., or St. Louis.

Democratic National Convention presidential vote, 30th ballot
Candidate	Votes	Percentage
William G. McAdoo	415.5	37.7%
Alfred E. Smith	323.5	29.4%
John W. Davis	126.5	11.5%
Oscar W. Underwood	39.5	3.6%
Samuel M. Ralston	33	3.0%
Carter Glass	24	2.2%
Joseph T. Robinson	23	2.1%
Albert C. Ritchie	17.5	1.6%
Others	95.5	9.9%

==== Forty-second ballot ====
Democratic National Convention presidential vote, 42nd ballot
Candidate	Votes	Percentage
William G. McAdoo	503.4	45.7%
Alfred E. Smith	318.6	28.9%
John W. Davis	67	6.0%
Others	209.0	19.4%

==== Sixty-first ballot ====
As a last resort, McAdoo supporters introduced a motion to eliminate one candidate on each ballot until only five remained, but Smith delegates and those supporting favorite sons managed to defeat the McAdoo strategy. Smith countered by suggesting that all delegates be released from their pledges—to which McAdoo agreed on condition that the two-thirds rule be eliminated—although Smith fully expected that loyalty would prevent the disaffection of Indiana and Illinois votes, both controlled by political bosses friendly to him. Indeed, Senator David Walsh of Massachusetts expressed the sentiment that moved Smith backers: "We must continue to do all that we can to nominate Smith. If it should develop that he cannot be nominated, then McAdoo cannot have it either." For his part, McAdoo would angrily quit the convention once he lost: but the sixty-first inconclusive round—when the convention set a record for length of balloting—was no time to admit defeat.

Democratic National Convention presidential vote, 61st ballot
Candidate	Votes	Percentage
William G. McAdoo	469.5	42.6%
Alfred E. Smith	335.5	30.5%
John W. Davis	60	5.4%
Others	233	21.5%

==== Seventieth ballot ====
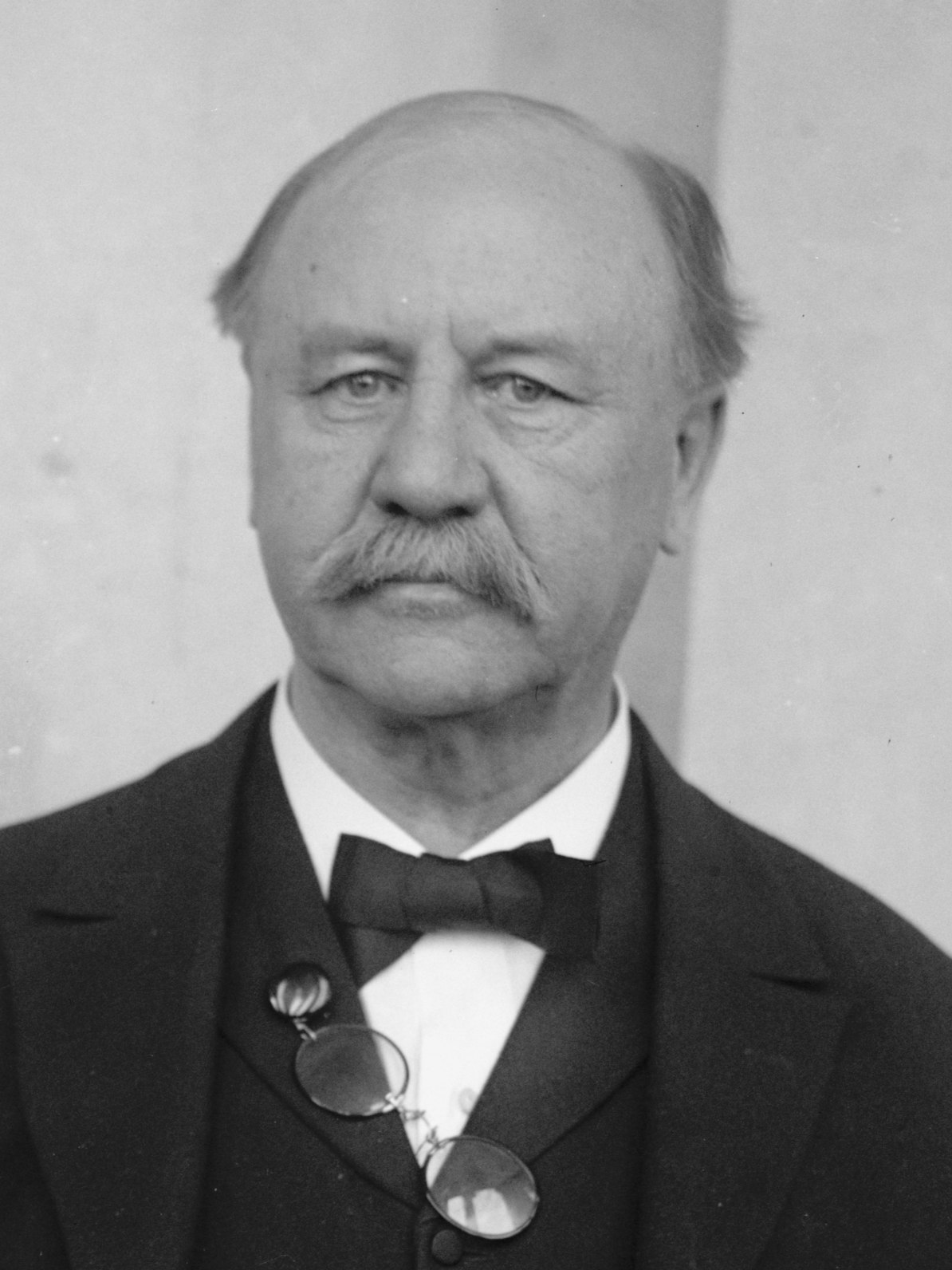
Samuel Moffett Ralston

It had seemed for a time that the nomination could go to Senator Samuel Ralston of Indiana. Advanced by Indiana party boss Thomas Taggart, Ralston's candidacy might attract support from the Bryans, given that Charles Bryan had written, "Ralston is the most promising of the compromise candidates." Ralston was also a favorite of the Klan and a second choice of many McAdoo delegates. In 1922, he had launched an attack on parochial schools that the Klan saw as an endorsement of its own views, and he won several normally Republican counties dominated by the Klan. Commenting on the Klan issue, Ralston said that it would create a bad precedent to denounce any organization by name in the platform. Much of Ralston's support came from the South and West—states including Oklahoma, Missouri, and Nevada that had strong Klan elements. According to Claude Bowers, McAdoo said: "I like the old Senator, like his simplicity, honesty, record"; and it was reported that he told Smith supporters he would withdraw only in favor of Ralston. As with John W. Davis, Ralston had few enemies, and his support from men as divergent as the Bryans and Taggart cast him as a viable compromise choice. He passed Davis, the almost consistent third choice, on the fifty-second ballot; but Taggart then discouraged the boom for the time being because the McAdoo and Smith phalanxes showed no signs of weakening. On July 8, the eighty-seventh ballot showed a total for Ralston of 93 votes, chiefly from Indiana and Missouri; before the day was over, the Ralston total had risen to almost 200, a larger tally than Davis had ever received. Most of these votes were drawn from McAdoo, to whom they later returned.

Numerous sources indicate that Taggart was not exaggerating when he later said: "We would have nominated Senator Ralston if he had not withdrawn his name at the last minute. It was a near certainty as anything in politics could be. We had pledges of enough delegates that would shift to Ralston on a certain ballot to have nominated him." Ralston wavered on whether to make the race; despite his doctor's stern recommendation not to run and the illness of his wife and son, Ralston had told Taggart that he would be a candidate, albeit a reluctant one. But the 300-pound Ralston finally telegraphed his refusal to go on; sixty-six years old at the time of the convention, he died the following year.

Democratic National Convention presidential vote, 70th ballot
Candidate	Votes	Percentage
William G. McAdoo	528.5	48.0%
Alfred E. Smith	334.5	30.4%
John W. Davis	67	6.0%
Others	170	15.6%

==== Seventy-seventh ballot ====
Democratic National Convention presidential vote, 77th ballot
Candidate	Votes	Percentage
William G. McAdoo	513	47.7%
Alfred E. Smith	367	33.3%
John W. Davis	76.5	6.9%
Others	134	12.1%

==== Eighty-seventh ballot ====
Democratic National Convention presidential vote, 87th ballot
Candidate	Votes	Percentage
Alfred E. Smith	361.5	32.8%
William G. McAdoo	333.5	30.3%
John W. Davis	66.5	6.0%
Others	336.5	30.9%

==== One hundredth ballot ====
Democratic National Convention presidential vote, 100th ballot
Candidate	Votes	Percentage
Alfred E. Smith	351.5	32.4%
John W. Davis	203.5	18.7%
William G. McAdoo	190	17.5%
Edwin T. Meredith	75.5	7.0%
Thomas J. Walsh	52.5	4.8%
Joseph T. Robinson	46	4.2%
Oscar W. Underwood	41.5	3.8%
Carter Glass	35	3.2%
Josephus Daniels	24	2.2%
Robert L. Owen	20	1.8%
Albert C. Ritchie	17.5	1.6%
James W. Gerard	10	0.9%
David F. Houston	9	0.8%
Willard Saulsbury	6	0.6%
Charles W. Bryan	2	0.2%
George L. Berry	1	0.1%
Newton D. Baker	1	0.1%

==== One hundred third ballot ====
The nomination was finally awarded to John W. Davis, a compromise candidate, on the one hundred third ballot, after the withdrawal of Smith and McAdoo. Davis had never been a genuine dark horse candidate; he had almost always been third in the balloting, and by the end of the 29th round he was the betting favorite of New York gamblers. There had been a Davis movement of considerable size at the 1920 San Francisco convention; however, Charles Hamlin wrote in his diary, Davis "frankly said ... that he was not seeking [the nomination] and that if nominated he would accept only as a matter of public duty". For Vice President, the Democrats nominated Charles W. Bryan, the governor of Nebraska and the brother of William Jennings Bryan, and for many years editor of The Commoner.

==== Full Balloting ====
A total of 58 candidates received votes over the 103 ballots, and the second ballot was the one where most candidates were voted for (20 in total).

The alphabetically sorted list of all 58 candidates:

- Henry Tureman Allen, retired Major general from Washington, D.C.
- Newton D. Baker, former Secretary of War from Ohio
- John T. Barnett, president of the Military Order of Foreign Wars from Indiana
- George G. Battle
- Martin Behrman, former Mayor of New Orleans
- George L. Berry, president of the IPPU union from Tennessee
- Fred H. Brown, Governor of New Hampshire
- Charles W. Bryan, Governor of Nebraska
- William Jennings Bryan, former Secretary of State from Nebraska
- John M. Callahan, convention delegate from Wisconsin
- Marcus A. Coolidge, former mayor of Fitchburg, Massachusetts
- Royal S. Copeland, U.S. senator from New York
- James M. Cox, former governor of Ohio
- William Coyne, businessman from Delaware
- Homer Stille Cummings, former chairman of the DNC from Connecticut
- Josephus Daniels, former secretary of the Navy from North Carolina
- Jonathan M. Davis, Governor of Kansas
- John W. Davis, former congressman from West Virginia
- William Emmett Dever, Mayor of Chicago
- Edward L. Doheny, businessman from California
- Edward I. Edwards, U.S. senator from New Jersey
- Woodbridge N. Ferris, U.S. senator from Michigan
- William Alexander Gaston, businessman from Massachusetts
- James W. Gerard, former U.S. ambassador to Germany from New York
- Carter Glass, U.S. senator from Virginia
- Pat Harrison, U.S. senator from Mississippi
- Gilbert Hitchcock, former U.S. senator from Nebraska
- David F. Houston, former secretary of the treasury from New York
- Cordell Hull, congressman from Tennessee
- John Holmes Jackson, Mayor of Burlington, Vermont
- John B. Kendrick, U.S. senator from Wyoming
- J. Richard Kevin
- Roland Krebs
- William Maloney
- Thomas R. Marshall, former vice president from Indiana
- Fred C. Martin
- William G. McAdoo, former secretary of the treasury from California
- Edwin T. Meredith, former secretary of agriculture from Iowa
- Emma Guffey Miller, convention delegate from Pennsylvania
- Albert A. Murphree, president of the University of Florida
- Robert Latham Owen, U.S. senator from Oklahoma
- Atlee Pomerene, former U.S. senator from Ohio
- Samuel M. Ralston, U.S. senator from Indiana
- Albert Ritchie, Governor of Maryland
- Joseph Taylor Robinson, U.S. senator from Arkansas
- Will Rogers, actor from Oklahoma
- Franklin D. Roosevelt, former assistant secretary of the Navy from New York
- Willard Saulsbury Jr., former U.S. senator from Delaware
- George Sebastian Silzer, Governor of New Jersey
- Al Smith, Governor of New York
- Thomas J. Spellacy, former U.S. Attorney from Connecticut
- Cora Wilson Stewart, president of the Kentucky Education Association
- William Ellery Sweet, Governor of Colorado
- Samuel Huston Thompson, Chair of the FTC from Pennsylvania
- Oscar Underwood, U.S. senator from Alabama
- David I. Walsh, U.S. senator from Massachusetts
- Thomas J. Walsh, U.S. senator from Montana
- Burton K. Wheeler, U.S. senator from Montana

(1-20)	Presidential Ballot																			
	1st	2nd	3rd	4th	5th	6th	7th	8th	9th	10th	11th	12th	13th	14th	15th	16th	17th	18th	19th	20th
J.W. Davis	31	32	34	34	34.5	55.5	55	57	63	57.5	59	60	64.5	64.5	61	63	64	66	84.5	122
McAdoo	431.5	431	437	443.6	443.1	443.1	442.6	444.6	444.6	471.6	476.3	478.5	477	475.5	479	478	471.5	470.5	474	432
Smith	241	251.5	255.5	260	261	261.5	261.5	273.5	278	299.5	303.2	301	303.5	306.5	305.5	305.5	312.5	312.5	311.5	307.5
Cox	59	61	60	59	59	59	59	60	60	60	60	60	60	60	60	60	60	60	60	60
Harrison	43.5	23.5	23.5	20.5	20.5	20.5	20.5	20.5	20.5	31.5	20.5	21.5	20.5	20.5	20.5	0	0	0	0	0
Underwood	42.5	42	42	41.5	41.5	42.5	42.5	48	45.5	43.9	42.5	41.5	40.5	40.5	39.5	41.5	42	39.5	39.5	45.5
Silzer	38	30	28	28	28	28	28	28	28	0	0	0	0	0	0	0	0	0	0	0
Ferris	30	30	30	30	30	30	30	6.5	0	0	0	0	0	0	0	0	0	0	0	0
Ralston	30	30	30	30	30	30	30	30	30.5	30.5	32.5	31.5	31.5	31	31	31	30	30	31	30
Glass	25	25	29	45	25	25	25	26	25	25	25.5	26	25	24	25	25	44	30	30	25
Ritchie	22.5	21.5	22.5	21.5	42.9	22.9	20.9	19.9	17.5	17.5	17.5	17.5	17.5	17.5	17.5	17.5	17.5	18.5	17.5	17.5
Robinson	21	41	41	19	19	19	19	21	21	20	20	19	19	19	20	46	28	22	22	21
J.M. Davis	20	23	20	29	28	27	30	29	32.4	12	11	13.5	11	11	11	11	10	10	9	10
C.W. Bryan	18	18	19	19	19	18	18	16	15	12	11	11	10	11	11	11	11	11	10	11
Brown	17	12.5	12.5	9.9	8.5	8	8	9	8	8	9	9	9	9	9	1	0	0	0	0
Sweet	12	12	0	0	0	0	0	0	0	0	0	0	0	0	0	0	0	0	0	0
Saulsbury	7	6	6	6	6	6	6	6	6	6	6	6	6	6	6	6	6	6	6	6
Kendrick	6	6	6	0	0	0	0	0	0	0	0	0	0	0	0	0	0	0	0	0
Thompson	1	1	1	1	1	1	1	1	1	1	1	1	0	0	0	0	0	0	0	0
T.J. Walsh	0	1	1	1	1	1	1	1	1	1	1	1	1	1	1	1	1	2	2	8
W.J. Bryan	0	0	0	0	0	0	0	1	1	0	0	0	0	0	0	0	0	0	0	0
Baker	0	0	0	0	0	0	0	0	0	1	1	0	1	1	1	0	0	0	0	1
Berry	0	0	0	0	0	0	0	0	0	0	1	0	0	0	0	0	0	0	0	0
Krebs	0	0	0	0	0	0	0	0	0	0	0	0	1	0	0	0	0	0	0	0
Copeland	0	0	0	0	0	0	0	0	0	0	0	0	0	0	0	0.5	0.5	0	1	0
Hull	0	0	0	0	0	0	0	0	0	0	0	0	0	0	0	0	0	20	0	0
Hitchcock	0	0	0	0	0	0	0	0	0	0	0	0	0	0	0	0	0	0	0	1
Dever	0	0	0	0	0	0	0	0	0	0	0	0	0	0	0	0	0	0	0	0.5

(21–40)	Presidential Ballot																			
	21st	22nd	23rd	24th	25th	26th	27th	28th	29th	30th	31st	32nd	33rd	34th	35th	36th	37th	38th	39th	40th
J.W. Davis	125	123.5	129.5	129.5	126	125	128.5	126	124.5	126.5	127.5	128	121	107.5	107	106.5	107	105	71	70
McAdoo	439	438.5	438.5	438.5	436.5	415.5	413	412	415	415.5	415.5	415.5	404.5	445	439	429	444.5	444	499	506.4
Smith	307.5	307.5	308	308	308.5	311.5	316.5	316.5	321	323.5	322.5	322	310.5	311	323.5	323	321	321	320.5	315.1
Cox	60	60	60	60	59	59	59	59	59	57	57	57	57	54	50	55	55	55	55	55
Underwood	45.5	45.5	39.5	39.5	39.5	39.5	39.5	39.5	39.5	39.5	39.5	39.5	39.5	39.5	39.5	39.5	39.5	39.5	38.5	41.5
Ralston	30	32	32	33	31	32	32	34	34	33	32	32	32	31	33	33.5	32	32	32	31
Glass	24	25	30	29	29	29	29	25	25	24	24	24	24	24	29	24	24	24	25	24
Robinson	22	22	23	22	23	23	23	24	23	23	24	24	23	24	24	24	24	24	23	24
Ritchie	17.5	17.5	17.5	17.5	17.5	17.5	18.5	18.5	17.5	17.5	16.5	16.5	16.5	16.5	16.5	16.5	17.5	17.5	18.5	17.5
Saulsbury	12	12	6	6	6	6	6	6	6	6	6	6	6	6	6	6	6	6	6	6
T.J. Walsh	8	8.5	8	9	16	14	7	7	1.5	1.5	2.5	3.5	2.5	1.5	0.5	0.5	0.5	1.5	1	0
J.M. Davis	5	5	5	5	5	5	6	6	6	6	6	6	6	3	3	3	3	4	3	3
Baker	1	0	0	0	0	0	0	0	0	0	0	0	0	0	0	0	0	0	0	0
Miller	0.5	0	0	0	0	0	0	0	0	0	0	0	0	0	0	0	0	0	0	0
Pomerene	0	0	0	1	0	0	0	0	0	0	0	0	0	0	0	0	0	0	0	0
Owen	0	0	0	0	0	20	20	24	24	25	25	24	25	5	25	25	24	24	4	4
Daniels	0	0	0	0	0	0	0	1	1	0	0	0	0	0	0	0	0	0	0	0
Martin	0	0	0	0	0	0	0	0	1	0	0	0	0	0	0	0	0	0	0	0
Gaston	0	0	0	0	0	0	0	0	0	0	0	0	0.5	0	0	0	0	0	0	0
Gerard	0	0	0	0	0	0	0	0	0	0	0	0	0	0	1	1	0	0	0	0
Doheny	0	0	0	0	0	0	0	0	0	0	0	0	0	0	0	1	0	0	0	0
Jackson	0	0	0	0	0	0	0	0	0	0	0	0	0	0	0	0	0	0	1	0

(41–60)	Presidential Ballot																			
	41st	42nd	43rd	44th	45th	46th	47th	48th	49th	50th	51st	52nd	53rd	54th	55th	56th	57th	58th	59th	60th
J.W. Davis	70	67	71	71	73	71	70.5	70.5	63.5	64	67.5	59	63	62	62.5	58.5	58.5	40.5	60	60
McAdoo	504.9	503.4	483.4	484.4	483.4	486.9	484.4	483.5	462.5	461.5	442.5	413.5	423.5	427	426.5	430	430	495	473.5	469.5
Smith	317.6	318.6	319.1	319.1	319.1	319.1	320.1	321	320.5	320.5	328	320.5	320.5	320.5	320.5	320.5	320.5	331.5	331.5	330.5
Cox	55	56	54	54	54	54	54	54	53	54	55	54	54	54	54	54	54	54	54	54
Underwood	39.5	39.5	40	39	38	37.5	38.5	38.5	42	42.5	43	38.5	42.5	40	40	39.5	39.5	38	40	42
Ralston	30	30	31	31	31	31	31	31	57	58	63	93	94	92	97	97	97	40.5	42.5	42.5
Glass	24	28.5	24	24	24	24	24	25	25	24	25	24	25	24	24	25	25	25	25	25
Robinson	24	23	44	44	44	44	45	44	45	44	43	42	43	43	43	43	43	23	23	23
Ritchie	17.5	17.5	17.5	17.5	17.5	16.5	16.5	16.5	16.5	16.5	16.5	16.5	16.5	17.5	16.5	16.5	16.5	16.5	16.5	16.5
Saulsbury	6	6	6	6	6	6	6	6	6	6	6	6	6	6	6	6	6	6	6	6
Owen	4	4	4	4	4	4	4	4	4	4	4	4	4	3	4	4	4	4	24	24
J.M. Davis	3	3	3	2	3	3	3	3	2	2	2	0	0	0	0	0	0	0	0	0
Cummings	1	0	0	0	0	0	0	0	0	0	0	0	0	0	0	0	0	0	0	0
Spellacy	1	1	0	0	0	0	0	0	0	0	0	0	0	0	0	0	0	0	0	0
T.J. Walsh	0	0	1	1	1	1	1	1	1	1	2.5	1	0	1	1	1	1	1	0	3
Edwards	0	0	0	1	0	0	0	0	0	0	0	0	0	0	0	0	0	0	0	0
C.W. Bryan	0	0	0	0	0	0	0	0	0	0	0	6	6	7	3	3	3	3	2	2
Battle	0	0	0	0	0	0	0	0	0	0	0	0	0	20	0	0	0	0	0	0
Roosevelt	0	0	0	0	0	0	0	0	0	0	0	0	0	1	0	0	0	0	0	0
Behrman	0	0	0	0	0	0	0	0	0	0	0	0	0.5	0	0	0	0	0	0	0

(61–80)	Presidential Ballot																			
	61st	62nd	63rd	64th	65th	66th	67th	68th	69th	70th	71st	72nd	73rd	74th	75th	76th	77th	78th	79th	80th
J.W. Davis	60	60.5	62	61.5	71.5	74.5	75.5	72.5	64	67	67	65	66	78.5	78.5	75.5	76.5	73.5	71	73.5
McAdoo	469.5	469	446.5	488.5	492	495	490	488.5	530	528.5	528.5	527.5	528	510	513	513	513	511	507.5	454.5
Smith	335.5	338.5	315.5	325	336.5	338.5	336.5	336.5	335	334	334.5	334	335	364	366	368	367	363.5	366.5	367.5
Cox	54	49	49	54	1	0	0	0	0	0	0	0	0	1	1	1	1	0	0	0
Underwood	42	40	39.5	39.5	40	39.5	46.5	46.5	38	37.5	37.5	37.5	38.5	47	46.5	47.5	47.5	49	50	46.5
Ralston	37.5	38.5	56	1	0	0	0	0	0	0	0	0	0	3.5	4.5	4.5	6.5	5	4	5
Glass	25	26	25	25	25	25	25	26	25	25	25	25	25	28	28	29	27	21	17	68
Owen	24	24	24	24	24	22	22	22	2	2	2	2	2	2	4	4	4	0	0	1
Robinson	23	23	23	24	23	21	21	21	21	21	21	21	21	23	25	25	24	22.5	28.5	29.5
Ritchie	16.5	16.5	16.5	16.5	16.5	16.5	16.5	16.5	16.5	16.5	16.5	16.5	16.5	16.5	16.5	16.5	16.5	16.5	16.5	16.5
Saulsbury	6	6	6	6	6	6	6	6	6	6	6	6	6	7	6	6	6	6	6	6
C.W. Bryan	2	4	4	3	3	2	3	3	2	3	2	2	3	4	4	4	4	3	3	4.5
T.J. Walsh	3	3	3	3	3	3	2	1	0	0	1	2	2	4.5	2	2	2	6	6	4
Ferris	0	0	28	24.5	6.5	0	0	0	0	0	0	0	0	0	0	0	0	17	18	17.5
D.I. Walsh	0	0	0	2.5	0	0	0	0	0	0	0	0	0	0	0	0	0	0	0	0
Baker	0	0	0	0	48	55	54	57	56	56	56	57.5	54	5	2	1	1	0	0	0
Wheeler	0	0	0	0	2	0	0	0	0	0	0	0	0	20	0	0	0	0	0	0
Rogers	0	0	0	0	0	0	0	1	0	0	0	0	0	0	0	0	0	0	0	0
Coolidge	0	0	0	0	0	0	0	0.5	0	0	0	0	0	0	0	0	0	0	0	0
Daniels	0	0	0	0	0	0	0	0	2.5	0	0	0	0	0	0	0	0	0	0	1
Kevin	0	0	0	0	0	0	0	0	0	0	0	0	0	1	0	0	0	0	0	0
Roosevelt	0	0	0	0	0	0	0	0	0	0	0	0	0	0	0	0	1	1	1	1
Gerard	0	0	0	0	0	0	0	0	0	0	0	0	0	0	0	0	0	1	1	0

(81–100)	Presidential Ballot																			
	81st	82nd	83rd	84th	85th	86th	87th	88th	89th	90th	91st	92nd	93rd	94th	95th	96th	97th	98th	99th	100th
J.W. Davis	70.5	71	72.5	66	68	65.5	66.5	59.5	64.5	65.5	66.5	69.5	68	81.75	139.25	171.5	183.25	194.75	210	203.5
McAdoo	432	413.5	418	388.5	380.5	353.5	336.5	315.5	318.5	314	318	310	314	395	417.5	421	415.5	406.5	353.5	190
Smith	365	366	368	365	363	360	361.5	362	357	354.5	355.5	355.5	355.5	364.5	367.5	359.5	359.5	354	354	351.5
Glass	73	78	76	72.5	67.5	72.5	71	66.5	66.5	30.5	28.5	26.5	27	37	34	39	39	36	38	35
Underwood	48	49	48.5	40.5	40.5	38	38	39	41	42.5	46.5	45.25	44.75	46.25	44.25	38.5	37.25	38.25	39.5	41.5
Robinson	29.5	28.5	27.5	25	27.5	25	20.5	23	20.5	20	20	20	19	37	31	32	22	25	25	46
Owen	21	21	20	20	20	20	20	20	20	0	0	0	0	0	0	0	1	1	3	20
Ritchie	16.5	16.5	16.5	16.5	16.5	23.5	23	22.5	22.5	16.5	16.5	16.5	16.5	16.5	20.5	21.5	19.5	18.5	17.5	17.5
Ferris	16	12	7.5	0	0	0	0	0	0	0	0	0	0	0	0	0	0	0	0	0
T.J. Walsh	7	4	4	1.5	3	5	4	5	3.5	5	4.5	4.5	4.5	4	2	4	4	6	4	52.5
Saulsbury	6	6	6	6	6	6	6	6	6	6	6	6	6	0	0	0	6	6	6	6
C.W. Bryan	4.5	4.5	5.5	6.5	9.5	7	7	9	9	15	8	8	8	9	9	7	6	5	5	2
Ralston	4	24	24	86	87	92	93	98	100.5	159.5	187.5	196.75	196.25	37	0	0	0	0	0	0
Barnett	1	0	0	0	0	0	0	0	0	0	0	0	0	0	0	0	0	0	0	0
Daniels	1	1	0	0	0	0	0	23	19.5	19	0	0	0	0	0	0	0	0	0	24
Roosevelt	1	1	1	1	1	1	1	1	1	1	0	0	0	2	2	1	0	0	0	0
Miller	0	0	0	0	0	0	1	0	0	0	0	0	0	0	0	0	0	0	0	0
Wheeler	0	0	1	0	0	0	0	0	0	0	0	0	0	0	0	0	0	0	0	0
Coyne	0	0	0	1	0	0	0	0	0	0	0	0	0	0	0	0	0	0	0	0
Baker	0	0	0	0	6	0	0	0	0	0	0	0	2	0	0	0	0	0	0	4
Meredith	0	0	0	0	0	26	26	26	26	26	26	26	26	26	26	0	0	0	37	75.5
Maloney	0	0	0	0	0	1	0	0	0	0	0	0	0	0	0	0	0	0	0	0
J.M. Davis	0	0	0	0	0	0	20	20	20	22	4	0	0	20	0	0	0	0	0	0
Cox	0	0	0	0	0	0	0.5	0	0	0	0	0	0	0	0	0	0	0	0	0
Cummings	0	0	0	0	0	0	0	0	0	0	8.5	8.5	8.5	1	0	0	0	0	0	0
Houston	0	0	0	0	0	0	0	0	0	0	0	2	0	0	0	0	0	0	0	9
Callahan	0	0	0	0	0	0	0	0	0	0	0	1	0	0	0	0	0	0	0	0
Copeland	0	0	0	0	0	0	0	0	0	0	0	0	0	17	2	0	0	0	0	0
Stewart	0	0	0	0	0	0	0	0	0	0	0	0	0	1	0	0	0	0	0	0
Marshall	0	0	0	0	0	0	0	0	0	0	0	0	0	0	0	0	2	3	2	0
Berry	0	0	0	0	0	0	0	0	0	0	0	0	0	0	0	0	0	0	1	1
Gerard	0	0	0	0	0	0	0	0	0	0	0	0	0	0	0	0	0	0	0	10

(101–103)	Presidential Ballot			
	101st	102nd	103rd before shifts	103rd after shifts
J.W. Davis	316	415.5	575.5	844
Underwood	229.5	317	250.5	102.5
T.J. Walsh	98	123	84.5	58
Glass	59	67	79	23
Robinson	22.5	21	21	20
Meredith	130	66.5	42.5	15.5
McAdoo	52	21	14.5	11.5
Smith	121	44	10.5	7.5
Gerard	16	7	8	7
Hull	2	1	1	1
Daniels	1	2	1	0
Thompson	0	1	1	0
Berry	0	1.5	0	0
Allen	0	1	0	0
C.W. Bryan	0	1	0	0
Ritchie	0.5	0.5	0	0
Owen	23	0	0	0
Cummings	9	0	0	0
Houston	9	0	0	0
Murphree	4	0	0	0
Baker	1	0	0	0

== Vice presidential nomination ==
=== Vice presidential candidates ===
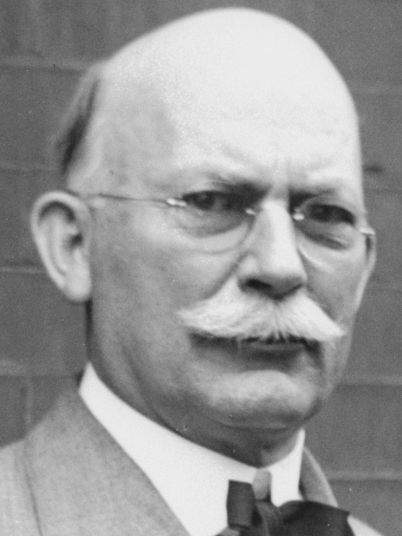
Governor
Charles W. Bryan
of Nebraska

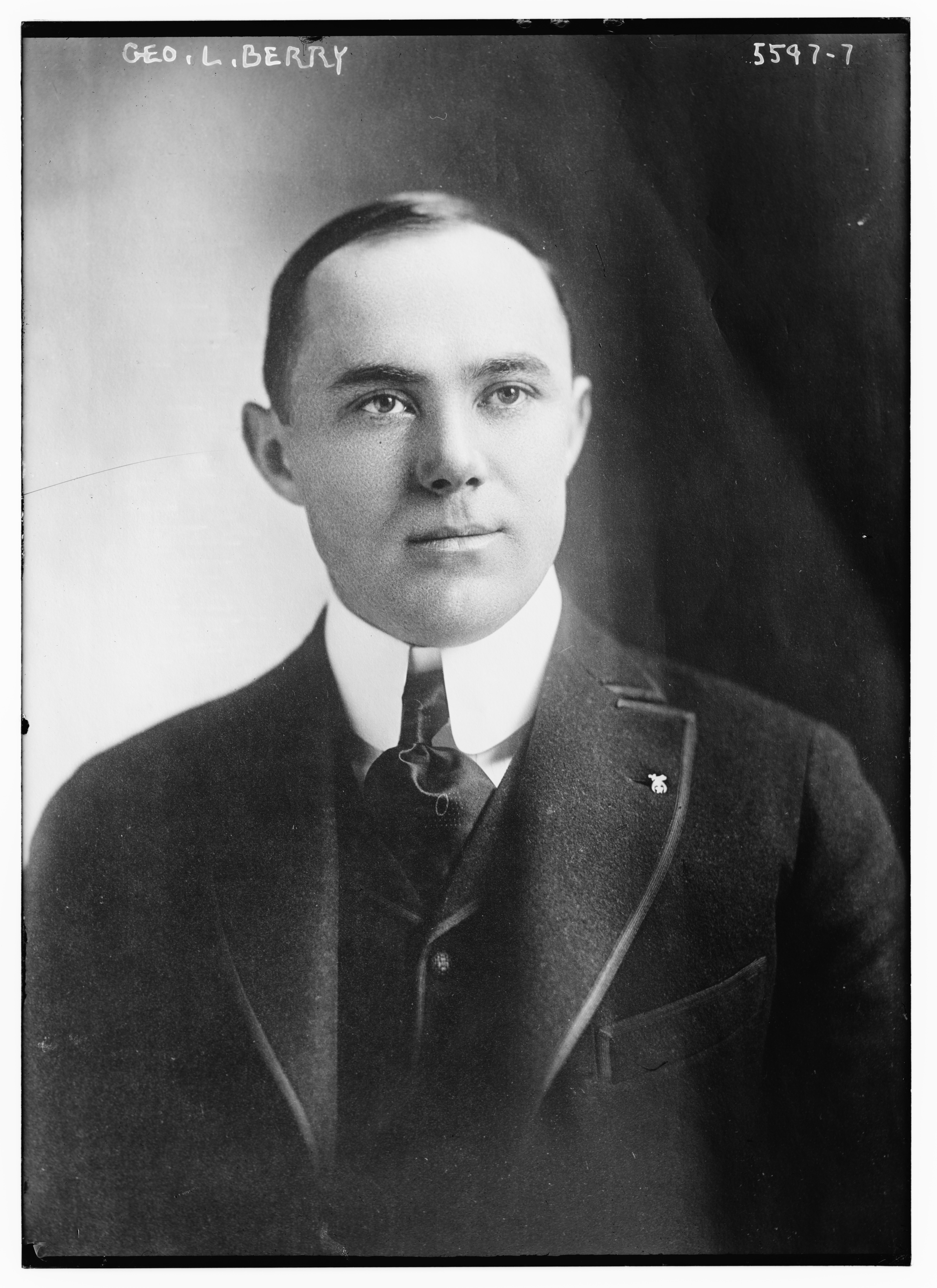
IPPU President
George L. Berry
of Tennessee

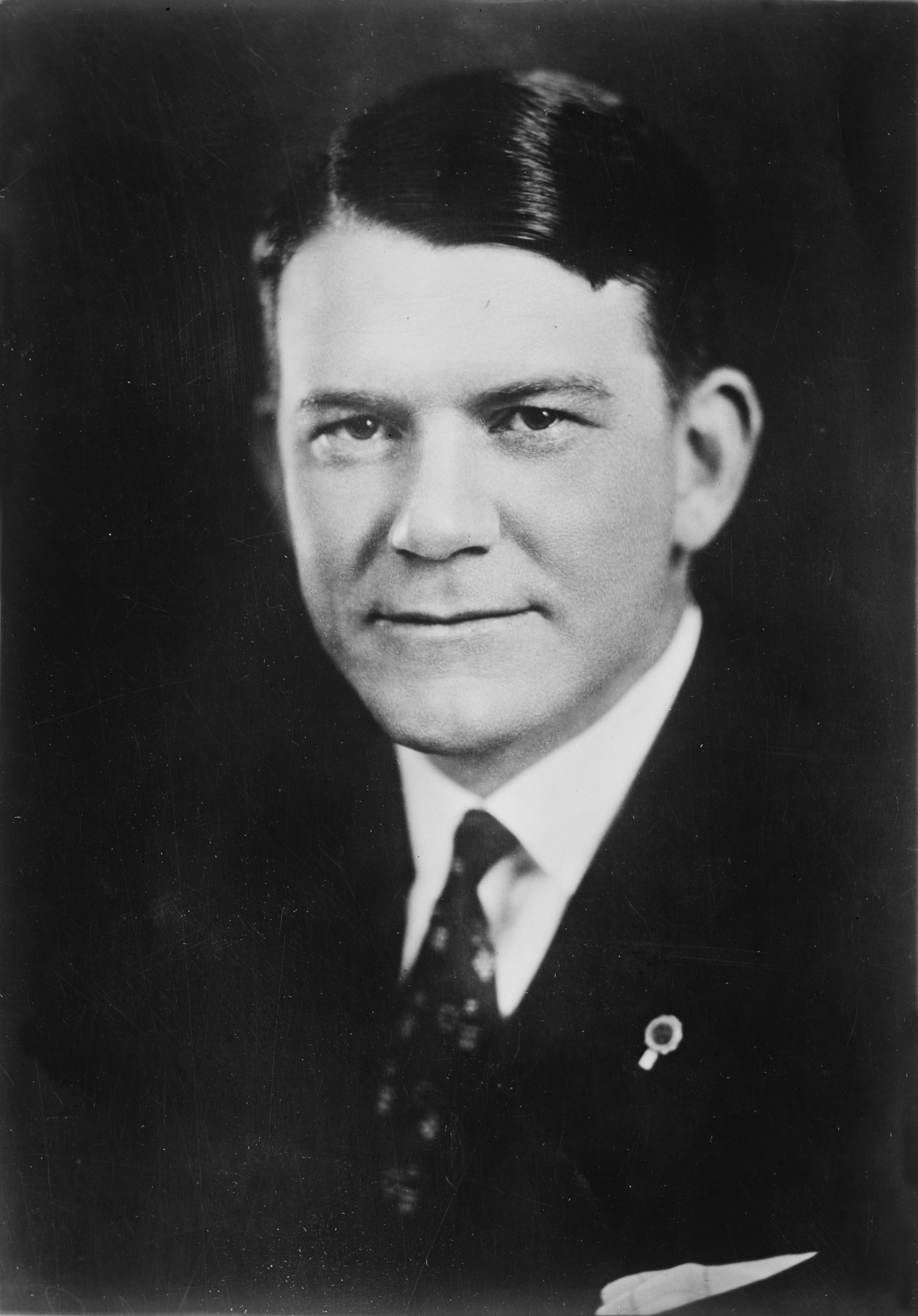
Former
American Legion Commander
Alvin M. Owsley
of Texas
(Withdrawn during balloting)

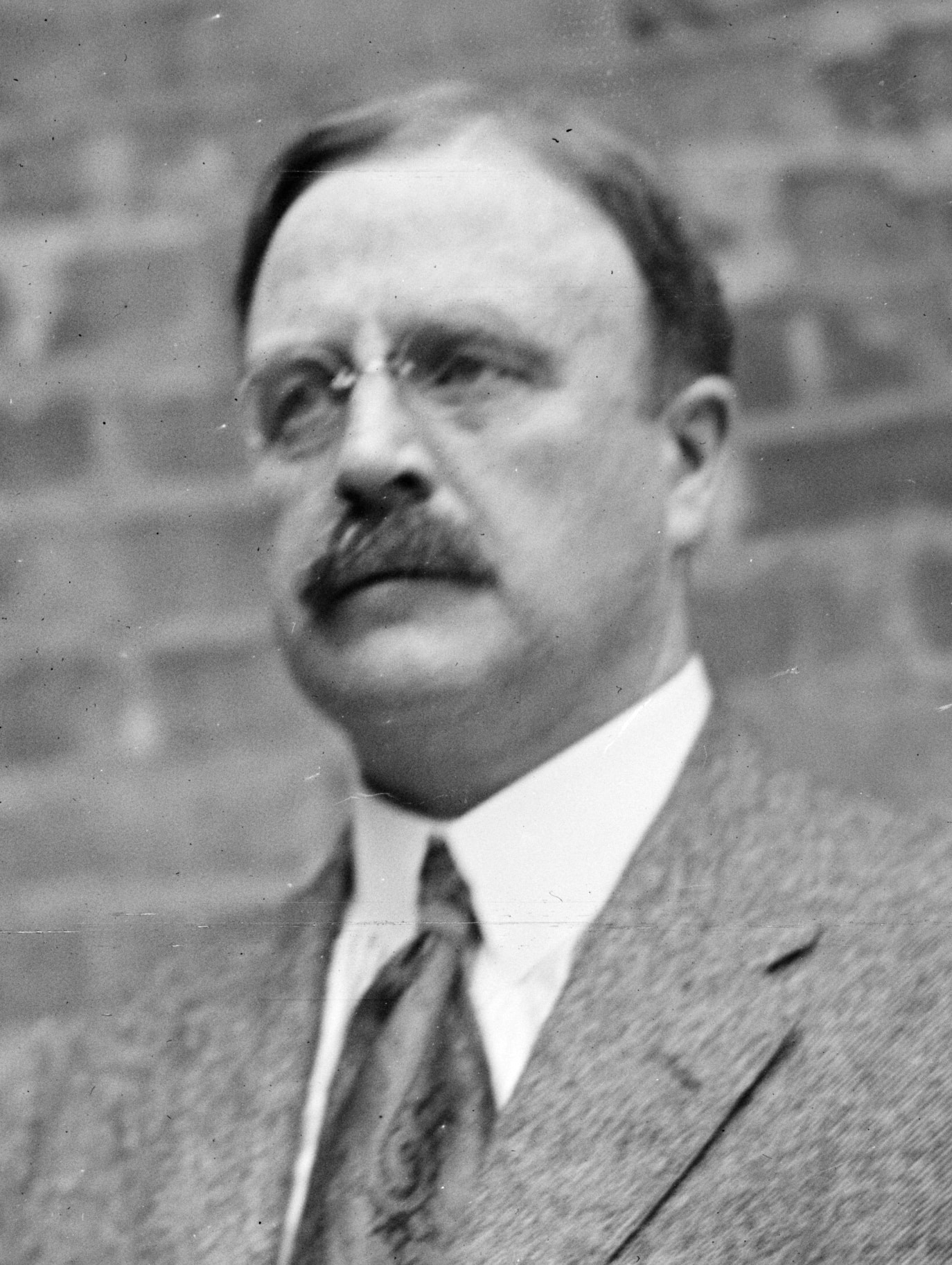
New York Mayor
John Francis Hylan
of New York

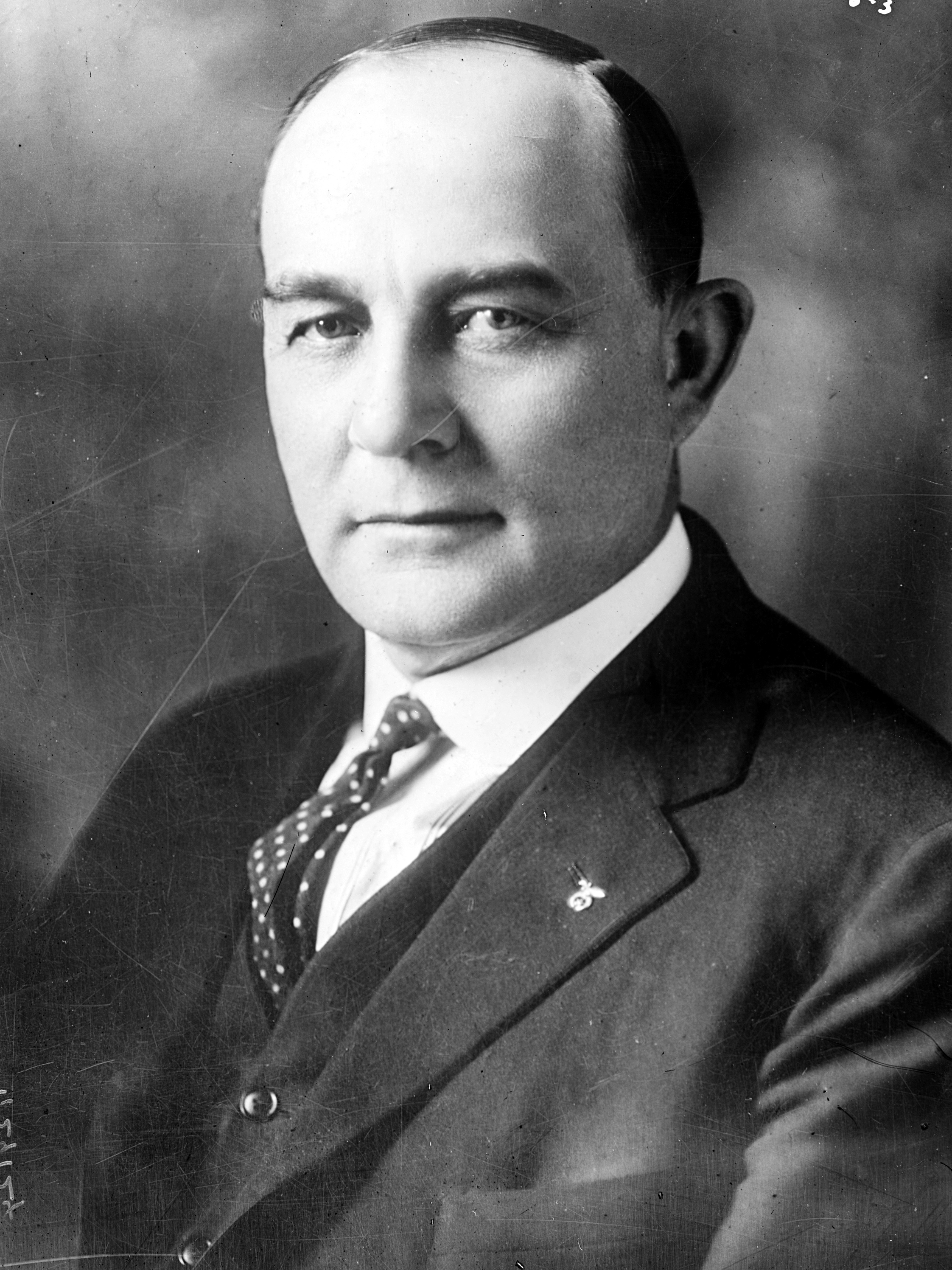
Governor
Jonathan M. Davis
of Kansas

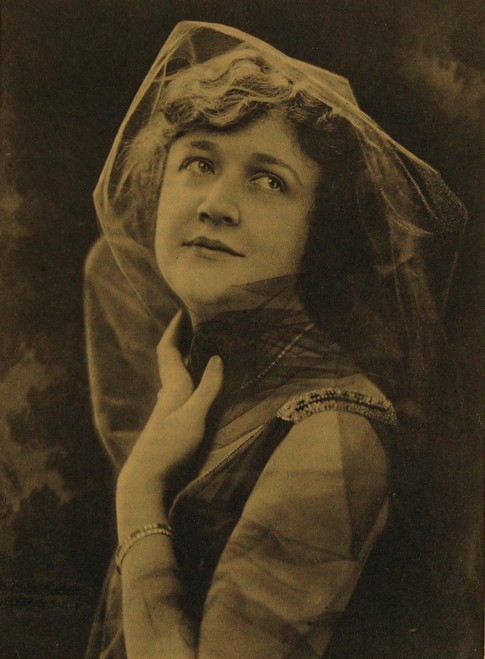
Women's Activist
Lena Springs
of South Carolina

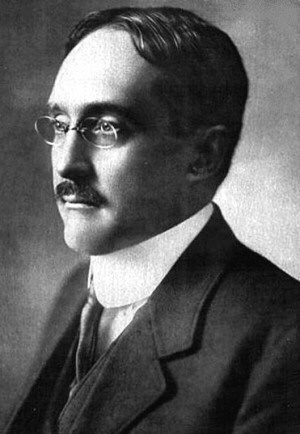
Former Ambassador
James W. Gerard
of New York

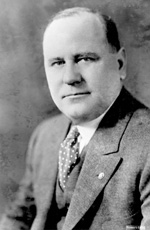
Legion Founder
Bennett Champ Clark
of Missouri

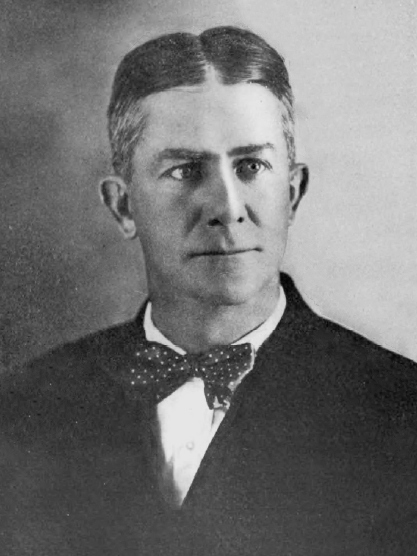
Brigadier General
John C. Greenway
of Arizona

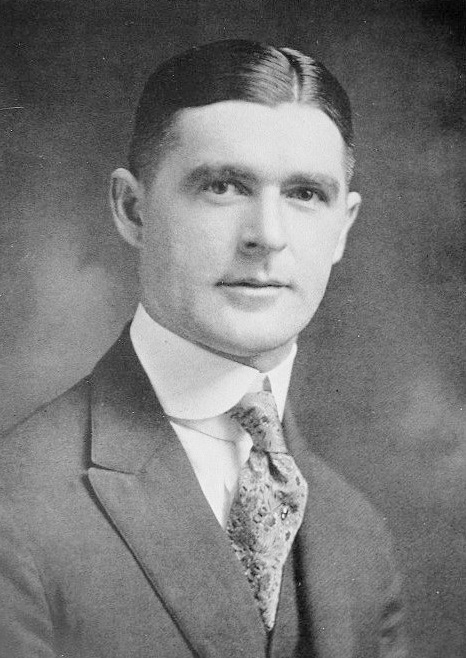
Governor
William S. Flynn
of Rhode Island

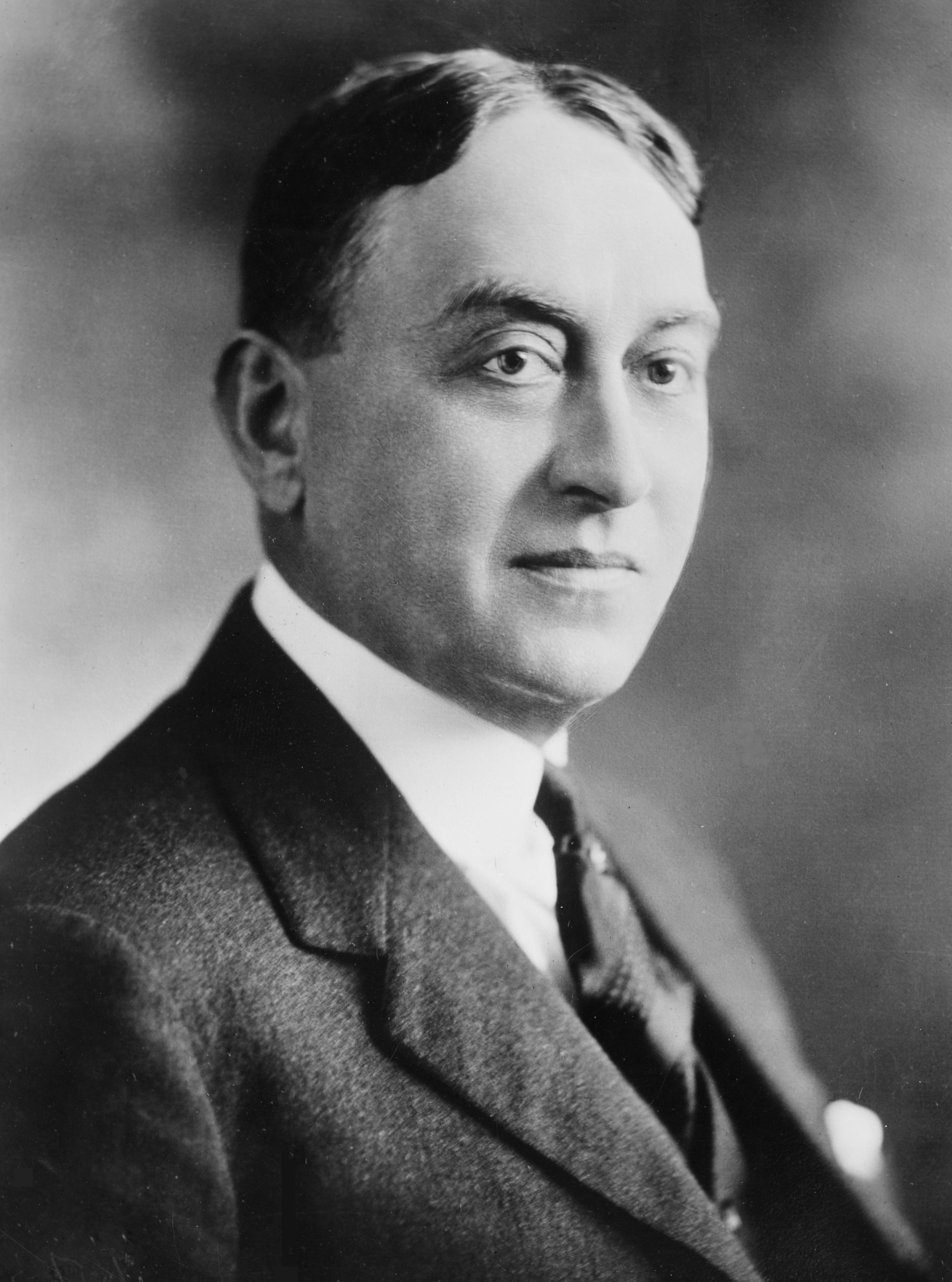
Governor
George S. Silzer
of New Jersey
(Withdrawn during balloting)

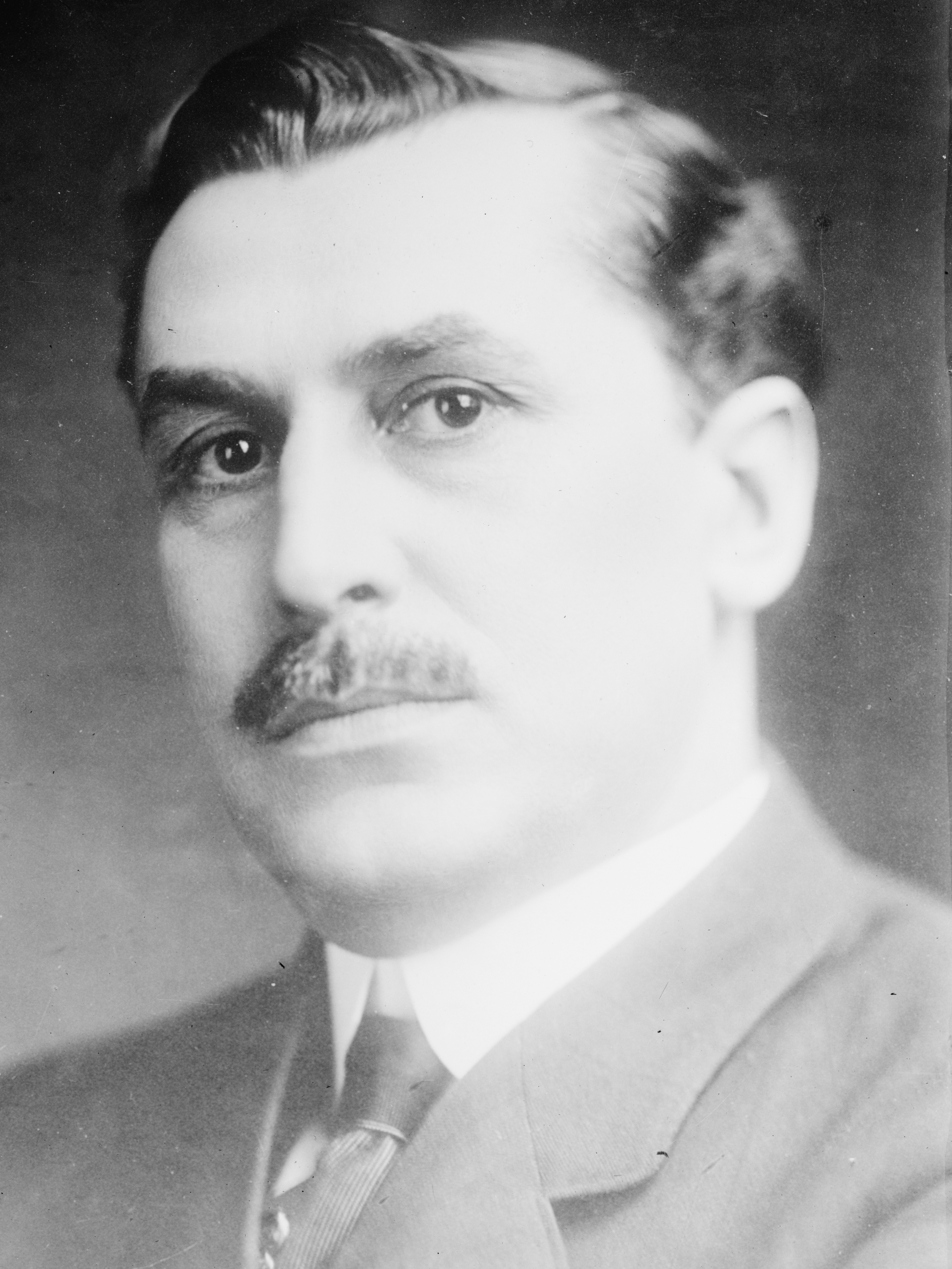
Former
Agriculture Secretary
Edwin T. Meredith
of Iowa
(Withdrawn before balloting)

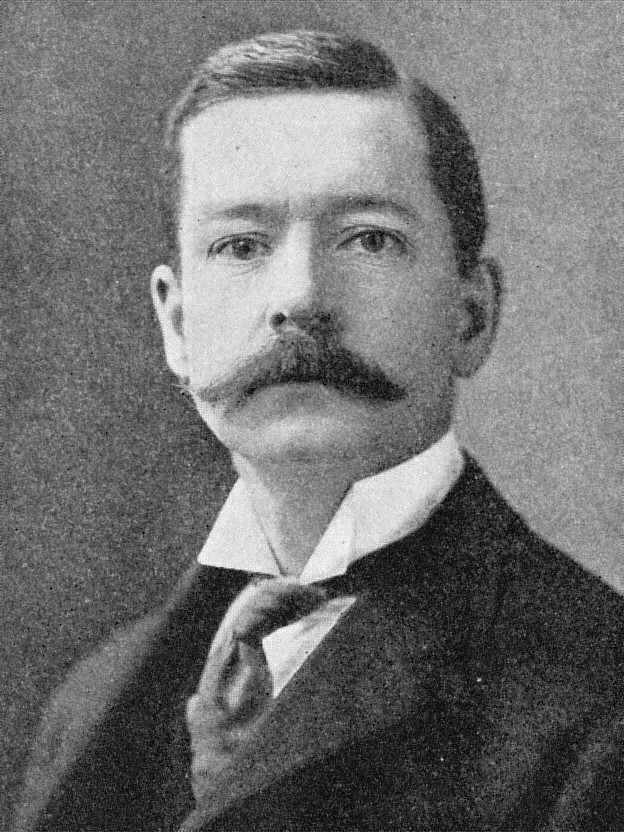
Former
Bank President
William A. Gaston
of Massachusetts
(Withdrawn before balloting)

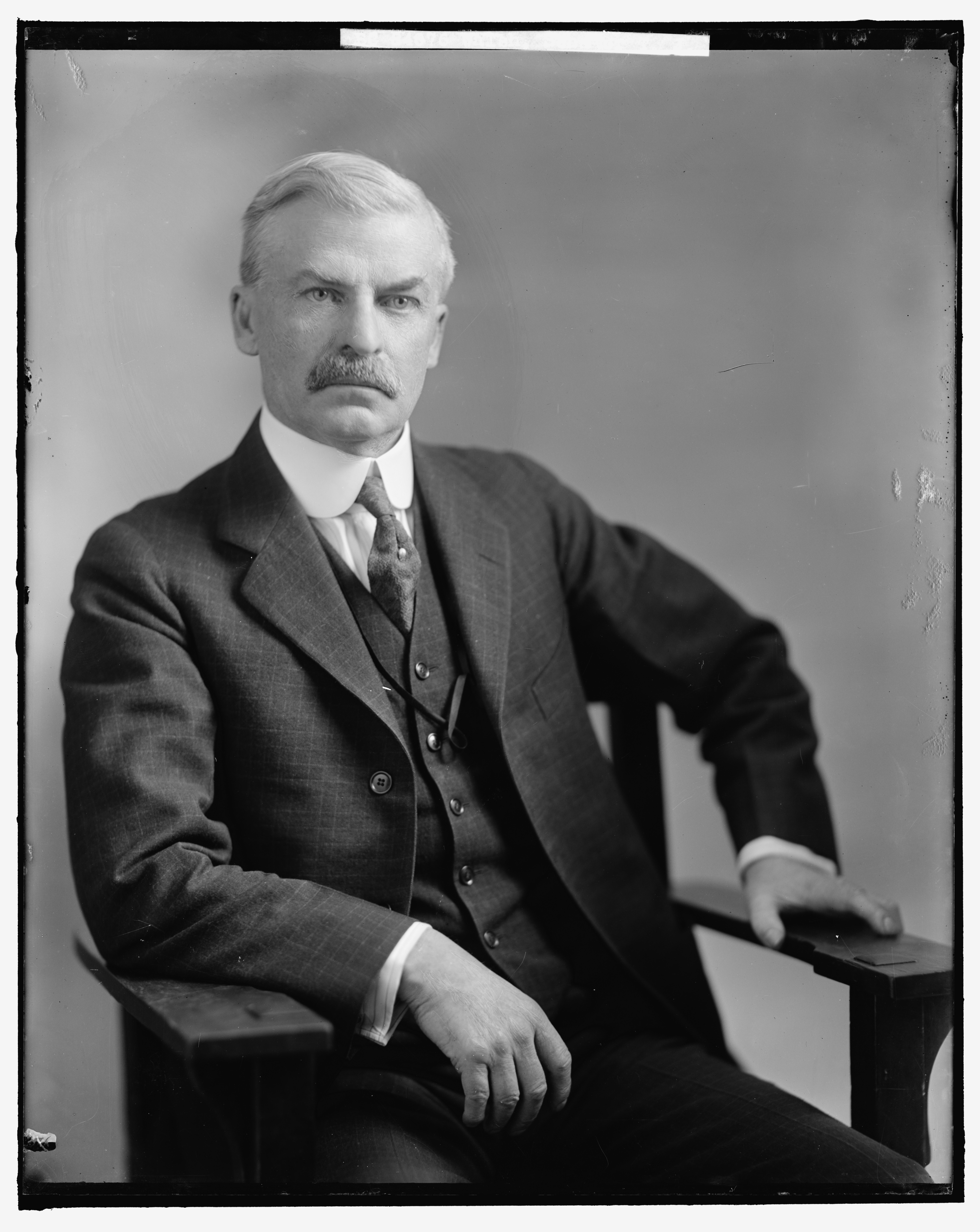
Senator
Thomas J. Walsh
of Montana
(Not Nominated -
Declined Consideration)

Thirteen names were placed into nomination for Davis' vice-presidential running mate, two of which were withdrawn before the balloting commenced. Early in the nominating process, the permitted length of speeches was limited to five minutes each. Despite this, the only ballot was chaotic, with thirty people, including five women, getting at least one vote for the nomination.

The party leaders first asked Montana senator Thomas J. Walsh to run for vice president, but Walsh refused since he desired re-election to the Senate as opposed to being a guaranteed unsuccessful vice presidential candidate. New Jersey governor George Sebastian Silzer, Newton D. Baker, and Maryland governor Albert Ritchie were also considered. Eventually, Charles W. Bryan, Governor of Nebraska, was proposed as a candidate who could unite the Smith and McAdoo factions. Bryan had been chosen by a group of party leaders, including Davis and Al Smith.

George Berry, a labor union leader from Tennessee, led Governor Bryan by a vote of 263.5 to 238 on an unrevised first ballot. Before the finalization of the first ballot, however, a cascade of switches from various candidates to Bryan took place, and Bryan was nominated with 740 votes. Notably, he remains, as of 2024, the only brother of a previous nominee (William Jennings Bryan) to be nominated by a major party.

The official tally was:

Vice Presidential Balloting
Candidate	1st (Before Shifts)	1st (After Shifts)
C. Bryan	238	740
Berry	263.5	208
Owsley	152	16
Hylan	110	6
Davis	56.5	4
Springs *	44	18
Gerard	42	10
B. Clark	24	41
Greenway	32	2
Fields	26	0
Farrell	21	1
Flynn	21	15
Walsh	16	0
Silzer	12	10
Baker	7	7
Pittman	6	6
Enright	5	5
Shuler	4	0
Miller *	3	3
Renshaw *	3	3
Chadbourne *	2	0
Meredith	2	0
Bird *	1	0
M. Clark	1	0
Erwin	1	0
Gardner	1	0
Ritchie	1	1
Thompson	1	0
Upshaw	1	1
Whitlock	1	1

Vice Presidential Balloting / 14th Day of Convention (July 9, 1924)

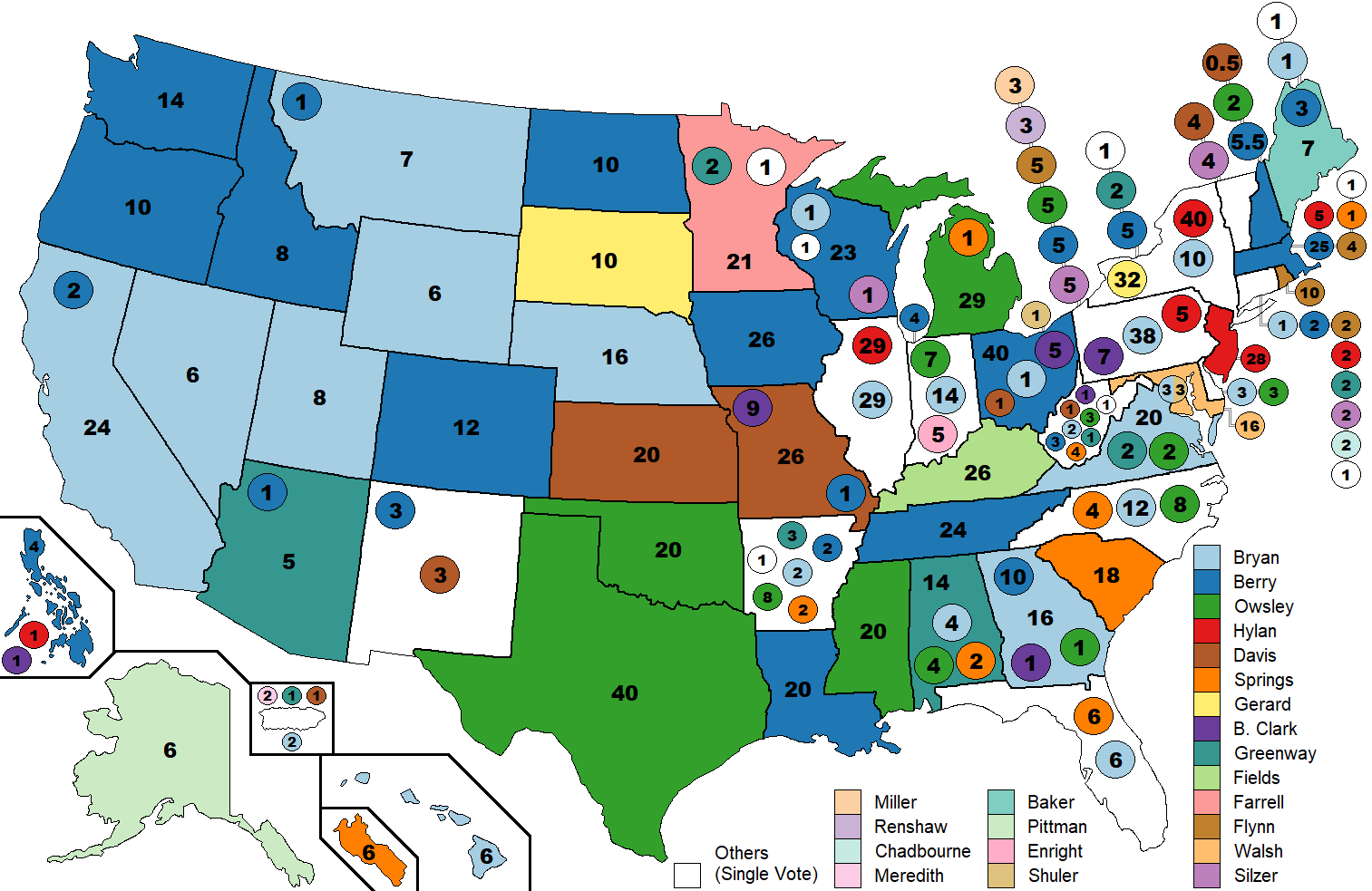
1st Vice Presidential Ballot (Before Shifts)

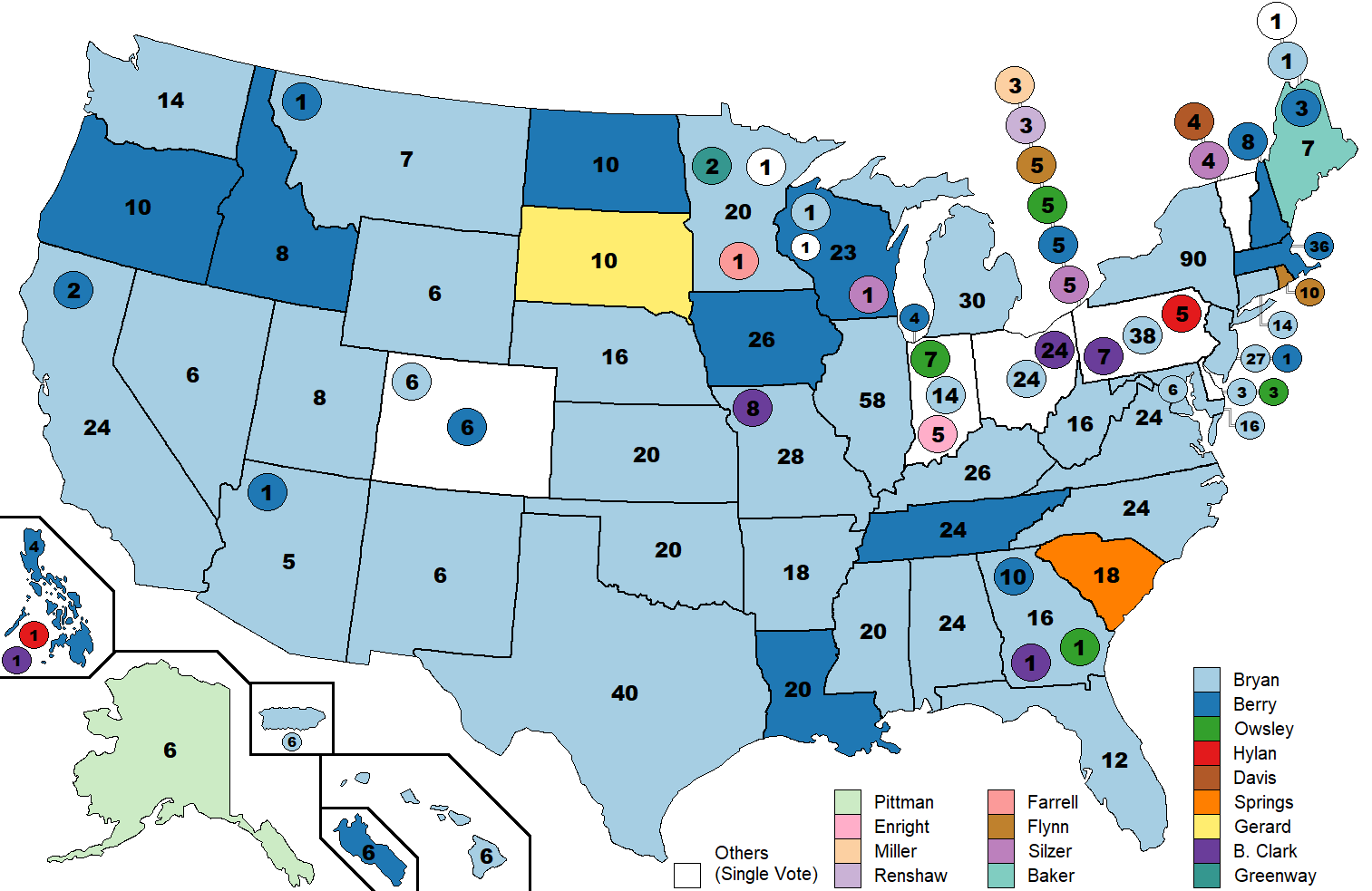
1st Vice Presidential Ballot (After Shifts)

== Prayers ==
Each of the convention's 23 sessions opened with an invocation by a different nationally prominent clergyman. The choices represented the party's coalition at the time: there were five Episcopalian ministers; three Presbyterians; three Lutherans; two Roman Catholics; two Baptists; two Methodists; one each from the Congregationalists, Disciples of Christ, Unitarians, and Christian Scientists; and two Jewish rabbis. All of the clergy were white men; African-American denominations were not represented.

With the convention deadlocked over the choice of a nominee, some of the invocations became calls for the delegates and candidates to put aside sectionalism and ambition in favor of party unity.

Among the clergy who spoke to the convention:

- Catholics included Patrick Joseph Hayes, Archbishop of New York, and Francis Patrick Duffy, Chaplain of the New York National Guard.
- Episcopalians, such as Thomas F. Gailor, Bishop of Tennessee, and Wythe Leigh Kinsolving, Chaplain of the Virginian Society of New York.
- The roster included, on different days, two fierce antagonists and frequent debaters on the theory of evolution and Biblical inerrancy, John Roach Straton, a Baptist conservative, and Charles Francis Potter, a Unitarian Modernist.
- Rabbi Stephen Samuel Wise, founder of the Free Synagogue, who was also a delegate from New York.
- Dr. Frederick Hermann Knubel, president of the United Lutheran Churches in America.

== Legacy ==
In his acceptance speech, Davis made the perfunctory statement that he would enforce the prohibition law, but his conservatism prejudiced him in favor of personal liberty and home rule and he was frequently denounced as a wet. The dry leader Wayne Wheeler complained of Davis's "constant repetition of wet catch phrases like 'personal liberty', 'illegal search and seizure', and 'home rule'". After the convention Davis tried to satisfy both factions of his party, but his support came principally from the same city elements that had backed Cox in 1920.

Broadcasting the convention's 103 ballots, and the debate over the Klan, embarrassed the Democrats. Neither Davis nor Bryan was a good radio speaker, unlike Republican president Calvin Coolidge.

The last surviving participant from the convention was Diana Serra Cary, who as a five-year-old child film star was the convention's official mascot; she died on February 24, 2020, at the age of 101.

- The convention featured the first seconding address by a woman in either national political parties was given by Izetta Jewel at this convention, seconding John Davis, and Abby Crawford Milton, seconding McAdoo.
- During his 1960 campaign, John F. Kennedy cited the dilemma of the Massachusetts delegation at the 1924 Democratic National Convention when making light of his own campaign problems: "Either we must switch to a more liberal candidate or move to a cheaper hotel."
- Both Franklin D. Roosevelt and Al Smith were filmed during the convention by Lee de Forest using his Phonofilm sound-on-film process. These films are in the Maurice Zouary collection at the Library of Congress.

== "Klanbake" meme ==
In 2015, conservative blogs and Facebook pages started circulating a photo of hooded Klansmen, marching at the 1924 DNC. In early 2017, a pro-Donald Trump Facebook group called "ElectTrump2020" turned the photo into a meme which was shared more than 18,000 times on Facebook alone. Author Dinesh D'Souza shared the photo and the meme on Twitter in September 2017. In fact, the widely circulated photo depicted a December 1924 march by Klansmen in Madison, Wisconsin, and had no connection to any political convention. The term "Klanbake" appears to have been coined by New York Daily News columnist Joseph A. Cowan, in a satirical column reporting on the Convention at the time. Cowan also used the derisive terms "klanvention" and "klandidate." In 2000, a Daily News reporter included the term in an historical article about the 1924 convention, stating erroneously that "newspapers" referred to the convention as the Klanbake, when in fact Cowan was the only writer to use the term.

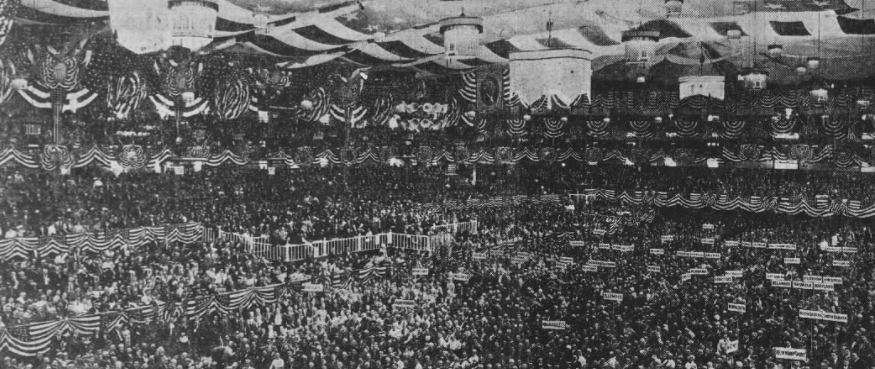
Panorama of the convention's opening session

== See also ==
- History of the United States Democratic Party
- Democratic Party presidential primaries, 1924
- List of Democratic National Conventions
- U.S. presidential nomination convention
- 1924 Republican National Convention
- 1924 United States presidential election

Preceded by 1920; San Francisco, California	Democratic National Conventions	Succeeded by 1928; Houston, Texas
