= William Coyne (executive) =

American business executive (1861–1933)

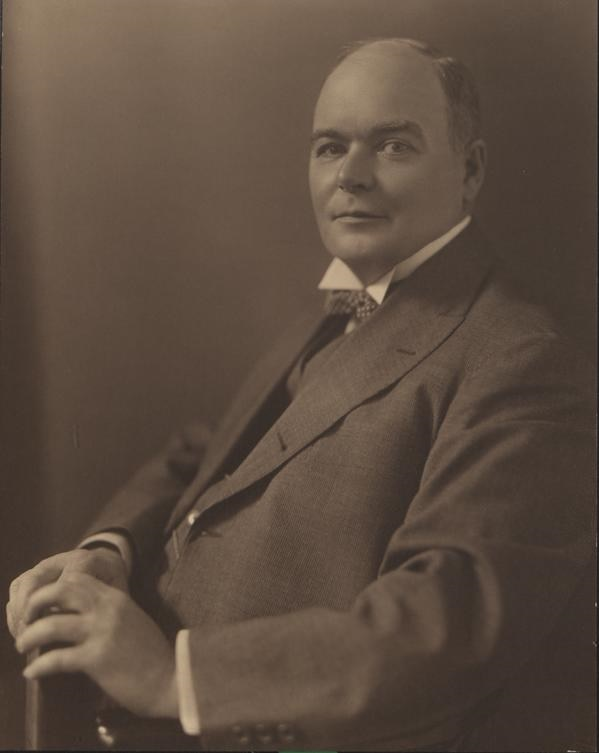
- Coyne circa 1925, while he was a DuPont vice president
- Born: July 14, 1861; Calumet, Indiana
- Died: November 1, 1933 (aged 72); Wilmington, Delaware
- Resting place: Cathedral Cemetery, Wilmington, Delaware
- Education: International Correspondence Schools of Scranton
- Occupation: Business executive
- Spouse: Sarah D. Coyne
- Children: 2

William Coyne (July 14, 1861 – November 1, 1933) was an American corporate executive and political figure. He was most notable for his work as a vice president and director of E. I. du Pont de Nemours and Company and a prominent supporter of the Democratic Party.

== Early life ==
William Coyne was born in Calumet Township, Lake County, Indiana (now part of Gary) on July 14, 1861. He was educated locally and completed a course in railway engineering through the International Correspondence Schools of Scranton.

Coyne began a railroad career as a telegraph operator for the Chicago, Milwaukee, St. Paul and Pacific Railroad. He subsequently worked as a telegraph operator for the Minneapolis and St. Louis Railway and Chicago, St. Paul, Minneapolis and Omaha Railway.

As Coyne advanced through into the ranks of management, positions he held included train dispatcher for the Minneapolis and St. Louis Railway and Chicago, St. Paul, Minneapolis and Omaha Railway and chief dispatcher for the Spokane Falls and Northern Railway. He later served as superintendent of the Virginia and Southwestern Railway in Bristol, Tennessee, followed by appointment as traffic manager of the Dominion Steel and Coal Corporation in Sydney, Nova Scotia. After his work in Nova Scotia, Coyne was appointed assistant to the president of the Lake Superior Corporation in Sault Ste. Marie, Ontario.

== Continued business career ==
In 1904, Coyne joined the DuPont company as a traffic investigator in its development department. Later that year he was appointed manager of the traffic department, and in 1907 he was promoted to director of the commercial sales department. In 1914 he was elected a director of DuPont's DuPont Powder Company subsidiary and was appointed to its executive committee. In 1916 he was elected a vice president of Dupont Powder. In this position, he was in charge of military sales during World War I. In 1919 he resigned from DuPont Powder's executive committee and was appointed to the company's finance committee.

In addition to his work with DuPont, Coyne was a director of Canadian Industries Limited, the Dunlop Tire & Rubber Company of Toronto, and the Farmers' Bank of Delaware. In addition, Coyne was head of the Every Evening Printing Company, which published The News Journal newspaper. He retired from his business interests in 1930.

== Political career ==
Coyne was active in politics as a Democrat. He was elected a delegate to the 1920 Democratic National Convention, but business considerations prevented him from attending. Other delegates from Delaware attempted to obtain the vice presidential nomination for Willard Saulsbury Jr. and made use of Coyne's proxy vote, but were unsuccessful. Coyne received one vote for president on one ballot during the protracted nomination struggle at the 1924 Democratic National Convention.

In 1930, Coyne was a major contributor to the campaign fund of former Senator Thomas F. Bayard Jr., who was running for the Democratic nomination in hopes of returning to the Senate after losing his seat in 1928. Bayard's campaign was the subject of Congressional and media scrutiny because the cost of Bayard's campaign was by far the highest of any Senate race that year.

== Death and burial ==
Coyne died in Wilmington, Delaware on November 1, 1933. He was buried at Cathedral Cemetery in Wilmington.

== Family ==
Coyne was the husband of Sarah D. Coyne (1867–1922). They were the parents of two sons, W. Carroll Coyne and Philip Coyne.
