= John T. Barnett =

American colonel (1851–1935)

John Thomas Barnett
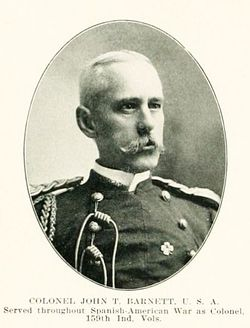
- Born: September 2, 1851; Danville, Indiana, U.S.
- Died: February 17, 1935 (aged 83); Indianapolis, Indiana, U.S.
- Education: United States Military Academy
- Military career
- Allegiance: United States
- Branch: U.S. Army; Indiana National Guard
- Service years: 1873–1886 (U.S. Army); 1898 (Volunteers); 1892–1903 (Indiana)
- Rank: Second lieutenant Colonel (Volunteers)
- Unit: 5th Cavalry Regiment
- Commands: 159th Indiana Infantry Regiment
- Conflicts: Spanish–American War

John Thomas Barnett (September 2, 1851 – February 17, 1935) was an American colonel in the Spanish–American War. A graduate of the West Point Class of 1878, Barnett had a short-lived career within the Regular Army as he succumbed to illness but re-enlisted to command the 159th Indiana Infantry Regiment.

== Service in the Regular Army ==
Barnett was born on September 2, 1851, at Danville, Indiana as the son of William and Nancy (née Buchanan) Barnett. He moved to Indianapolis by 1871, living at 2001 N. Delaware Street and briefly attended DePauw University. He then enrolled in the United States Military Academy as a cadet from July 1, 1873, to June 13, 1878, when he graduated as a second lieutenant of the 5th Cavalry Regiment on June 14, 1878. He initially served at Fort D. A. Russell from October 1 to November 25, 1878, but Barnett took a sick leave from November 25, 1878, to January 2, 1883, and because of his various illnesses by the point, he was retired on August 10, 1886, for "disability incurred in line of duty".

== Other careers ==
In 1893, Barnett moved to Meridian Street, Indianapolis where he settled for about a year. After his health improved, he then moved to Piqua, Ohio in the Spring of 1894 to get involved in the hardware business as he later took over the management and presidency of the Barnett Hardware Company until 1899 as he then returned to Indianapolis. With his return to his home state, he took up a career in the manufacturing pharmaceutical business until his illness returned at which point, he had to resign. Once his health improved again, he became engaged to the real estate, loan and insurance businesses with his office currently residing at No. 50 North Delaware street, Indianapolis. He would also gain presidency of the Military Order of Foreign Wars and the Sons of the Revolution. He would also become Chairman of the Military Committee of the Chamber of Commerce.

== Indiana National Guard Service ==
Around the same time Barnett began venturing out to other businesses, he was appointed Assistant Inspector General of the Indiana National Guard by Governor Claude Matthews and Barnett would hold the position until 1895 due to his general absence. After the outbreak of the Spanish–American War, Barnett offered his services to both Indiana and Ohio and was then appointed Colonel of the 159th Indiana Infantry Regiment on May 12, 1898 and was transferred to Camp George Meade but was mustered out at Camp Mount, Indianapolis on November 23, 1898. After the war, he would continue serving in the Indiana National Guard, becoming a Lieutenant Colonel and Assistant Inspector General from 1899 to 1903.

== Family ==
On December 18, 1879, Barnett married Emma Charlotte Peirsol and would have two children. The first, William P. (born February 14, 1881), would die at birth while the second, Chester Piersol Barnett (born January 14, 1887) would survive. Peirsol would then die in May 1892 and Barnett remarried to Cora C. Campbell in 1893 but they would have no children.
