= Andrews House =

Andrews House may refer to the following places in the United States:

- Col. Ralph Andrews House, Beebe, Arkansas
- Elisha Benjamin Andrews House, Brown University, Providence, Rhode Island
- William Andrews House, Napa, California
- McHugh–Andrews House, Fort Collins, Colorado
- Mosman House, Fort Collins, Colorado, also known as Andrews House
- Luman Andrews House, Southington, Connecticut
- Moses Andrews House, Meriden, Connecticut
- Josiah Andrews House, Des Moines, Iowa
- Lt. Robert Andrews House, Bridgton, Maine
- French–Andrews House, Topsfield, Massachusetts
- Joseph Andrews House, Waltham, Massachusetts
- Andrews-Leggett House, Commerce, Michigan
- John R. Andrews House, Kasota, Minnesota, NRHP-listed in Le Sueur County
- Andrews-Wing House, Boonville, Missouri
- Andrews-Moore House, Bunn, North Carolina
- Andrews-Duncan House, Raleigh, North Carolina
- Heck-Andrews House, Raleigh, North Carolina
- Carson-Andrews Mill and Ben F.W. Andrews House, Washburn, North Carolina
- Ebenezer Andrews House, Milan, Ohio
- Andrews–Luther Farm, Scituate, Rhode Island
- Sewall–Andrews House, Mukwonago, Wisconsin, NRHP-listed in Waukesha County
- Morey–Andrews House, Waukesha, Wisconsin, NRHP-listed in Waukesha County

== See also ==
- H. C. Cohen Company Building–Andrews Building, Rochester, New York
- Bishop-Andrews Hotel, Greenville, Florida
- H.O. Andrews Feed Mill, Union, Pennsylvania
