= Wing House =

Wing House may refer to:

- Wing House Museum, Coldwater, Michigan
- Andrews-Wing House, Boonville, Missouri
- Tabor-Wing House, Dover Plains, New York
- Helen Wing House, Glen Falls, New York
- Asa and Caroline Wing House, Mexico, New York
- Brown-Wing House, Bloomfield Township, Trumbull County, Ohio, listed on the National Register of Historic Places
- Wing Fort House, East Sandwich, Massachusetts

== See also ==
- 747 Wing House
- The WingHouse Bar & Grill
