= Montezuma Fuller =

American architect

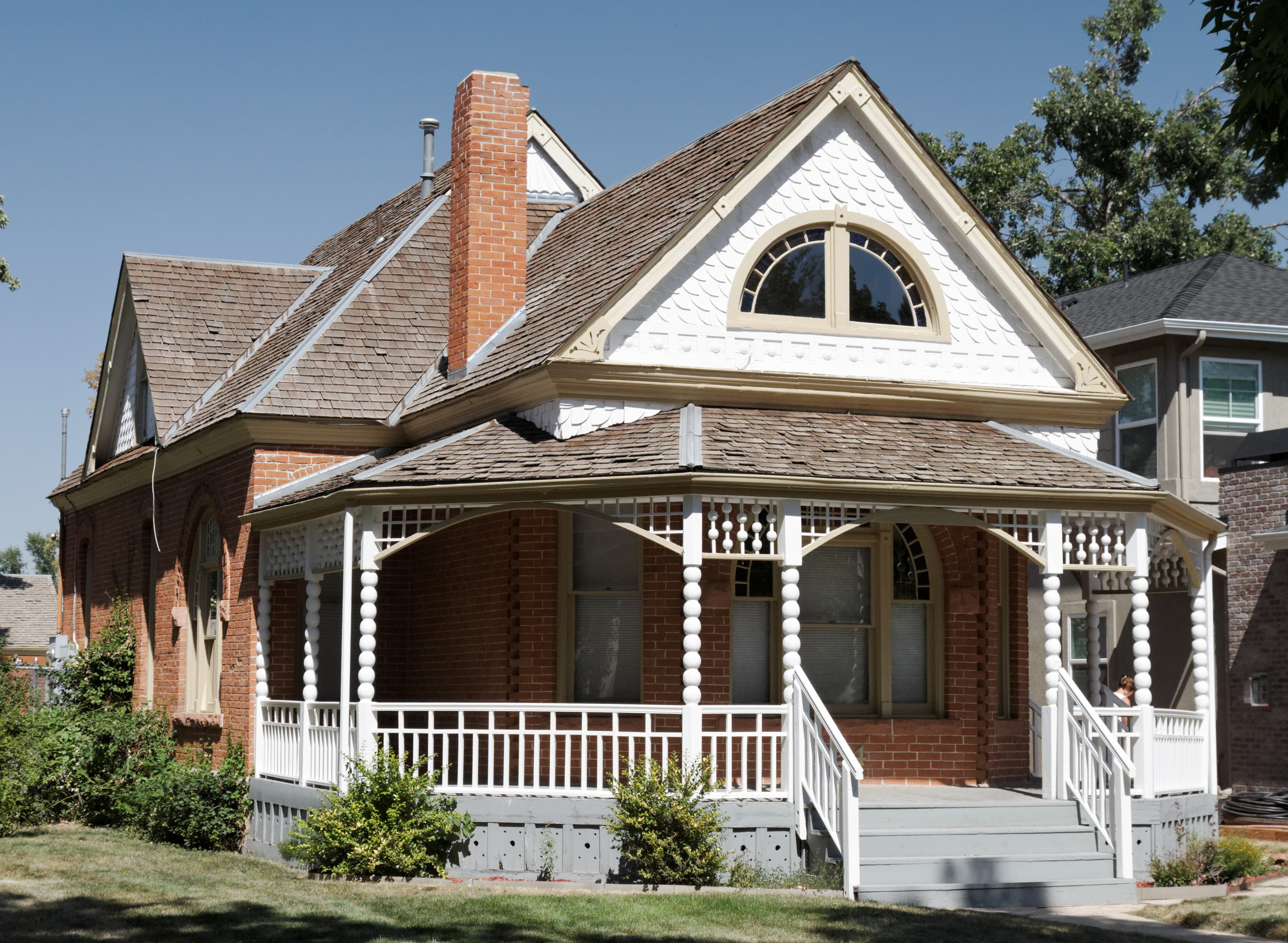
Mosman House

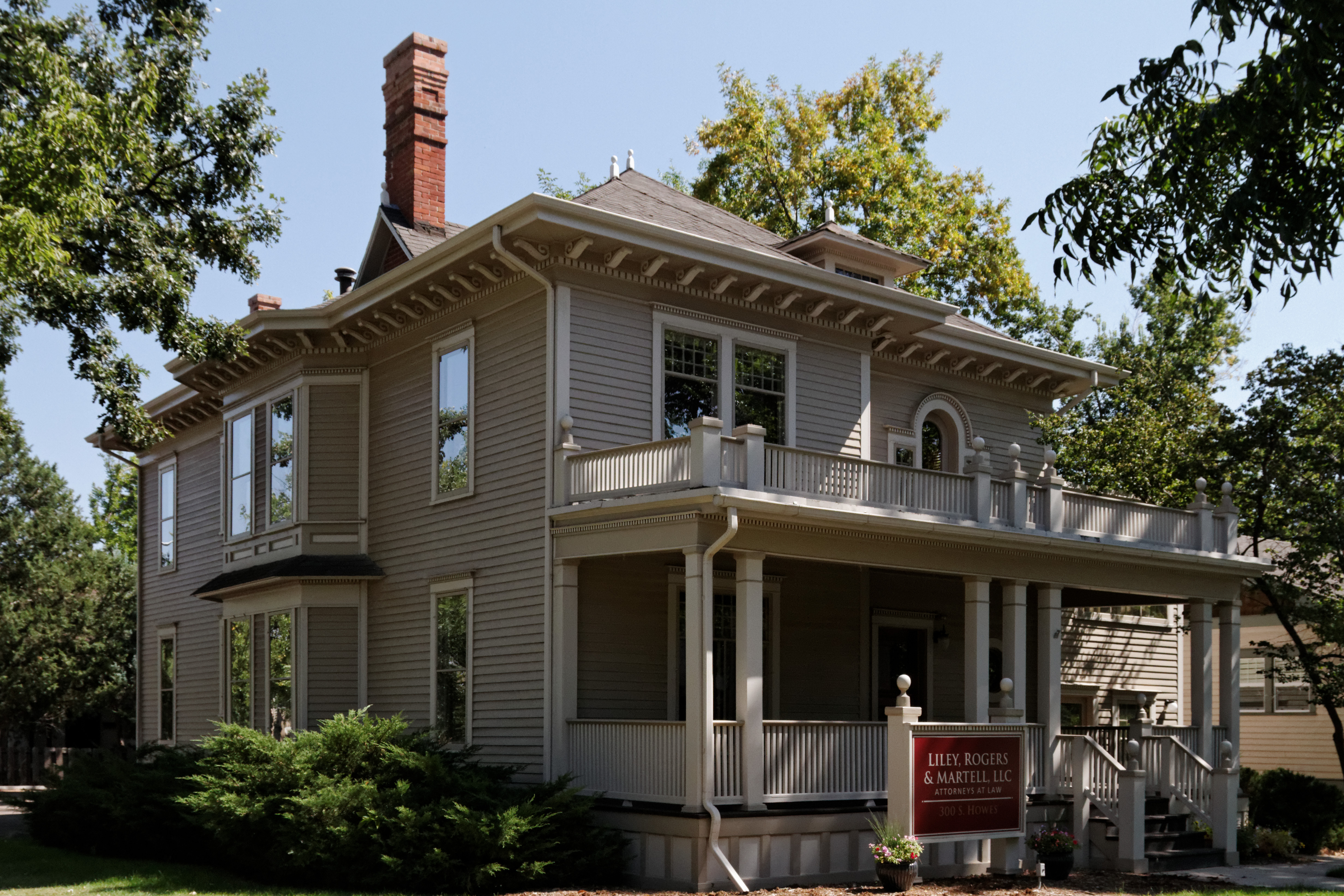
Peter Anderson House

Montezuma Fuller (1858–1925) was an American architect. He was the "most notable architect in the late nineteenth and early twentieth centuries" of Fort Collins, Colorado.

He was born November 13, 1858, in Nova Scotia. In 1880 he came to Fort Collins, Colorado and worked for local contractors. He became known as a "'carpenter and builder'" and eventually "developed a reputation as an 'architect' although he still had no formal training in that field."

A number of his works are listed on the U.S. National Register of Historic Places (NRHP).

Works include:

- Peter Anderson House, 300 S. Howes St. Fort Collins, Colorado, NRHP-listed
- First United Presbyterian Church, built 1906, 400 E. 4th St. Loveland, Colorado, NRHP-listed
- Montezuma Fuller House, 226 W. Magnolia St. Fort Collins, Colorado, NRHP-listed
- Kissock Block Building, 115–121 E. Mountain Ave. Fort Collins, Colorado, NRHP-listed
- Six or more works in Laurel School Historic District, including Laurel School, district is located off U.S. 287 Fort Collins, Colorado, NRHP-listed
- McHugh–Andrews House, 202 Remington St. Fort Collins, Colorado, NRHP-listed
- Mosman House, 324 E. Oak St. Fort Collins, Colorado, NRHP-listed

A biography, Montezuma W. Fuller: A history of his life and architectural practice, by Elizabeth A Bacon, is out of print.
