= Thomas Burnham House =

Historic house in New York, United States

- U.S. National Register of Historic Places
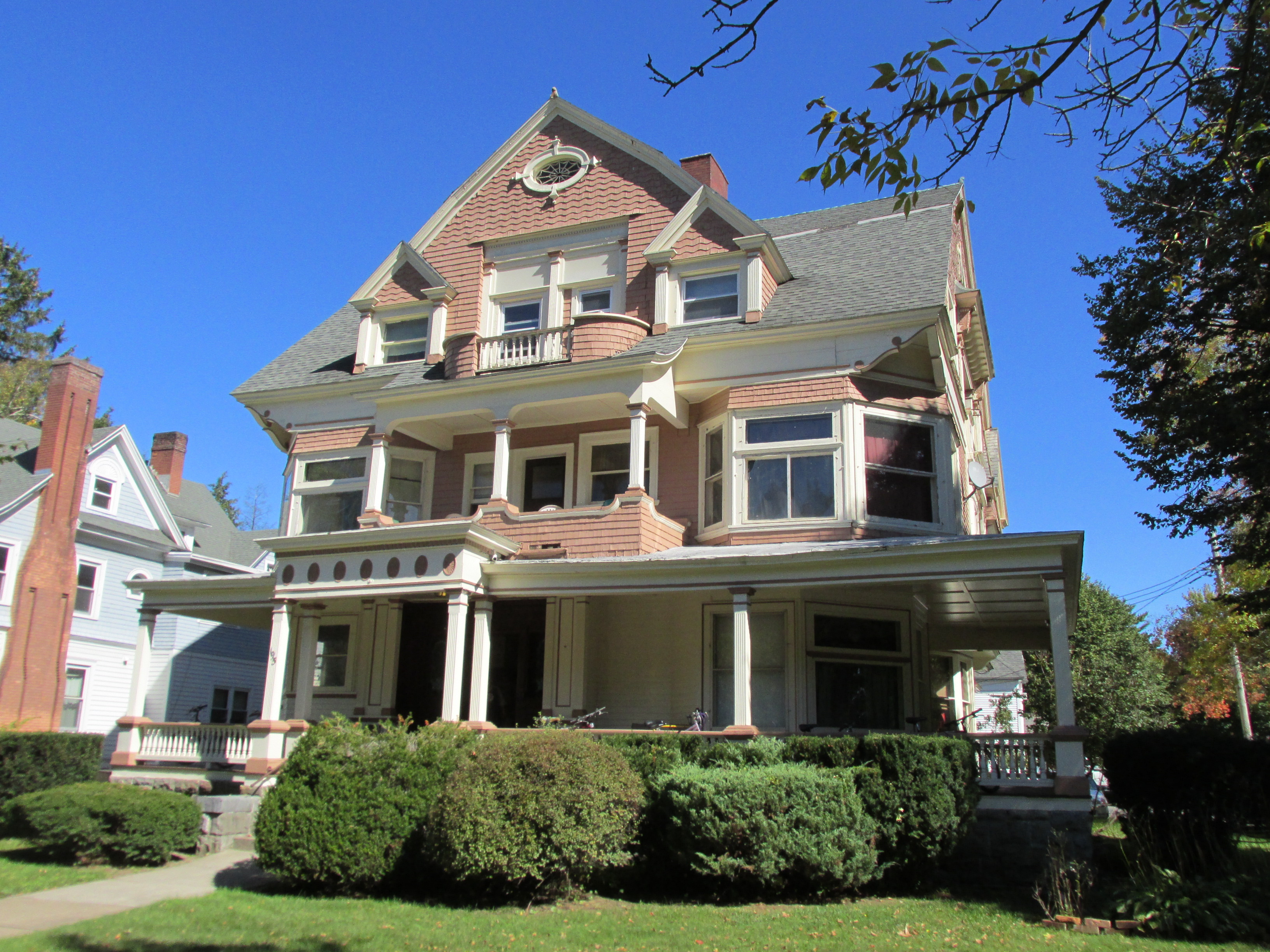
- Thomas Burnham House

- Location within New York Location within the United States
- Location: 195 Ridge St., Glens Falls, New York
- Coordinates: 43°19′5″N 73°38′37″W
- Area: less than one acre
- Built: 1897
- Architect: Potter, Ephraim B.
- Architectural style: Colonial Revival, Queen Anne
- MPS: Potter, Ephraim B., Buildings TR
- NRHP reference No.: 84003248
- Added to NRHP: September 29, 1984

The Thomas Burnham House is a historic house located at 195 Ridge Street in Glens Falls, Warren County, New York.

== Description and history ==
It was built in 1897 by esteemed local architect Ephraim B. Potter, and is a massive, 2 1/2-story, square residential building with Queen Anne and Colonial Revival style design elements. It features a large tripartite gambrel-roofed dormer.

It was added to the National Register of Historic Places on September 29, 1984.

== See also ==
- National Register of Historic Places listings in Warren County, New York
