= Kissock Block Building =

- U.S. National Register of Historic Places
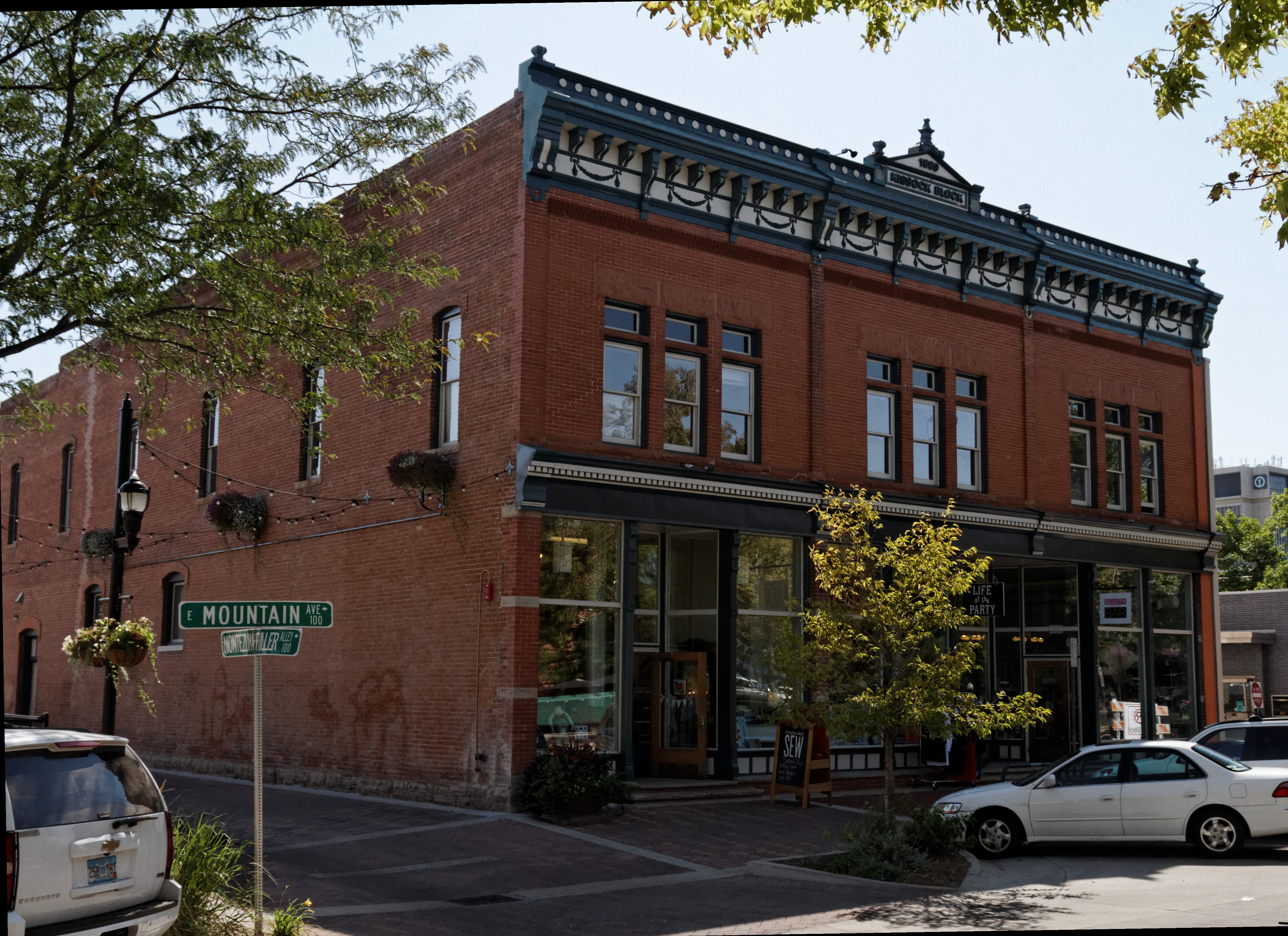

- Location within Colorado
- Location: 115–121 E. Mountain Ave., Fort Collins, Colorado
- Coordinates: 40°35′12″N 105°4′33″W
- Area: 0.2 acres (0.081 ha)
- Built: 1889
- Architect: Fuller, Montezuma
- Architectural style: Commercial Victorian
- NRHP reference No.: 85001061
- Added to NRHP: May 16, 1985

The Kissock Block Building is a historic commercial building located at 115–121 East Mountain Avenue in Fort Collins, Colorado. The two-story brick structure was completed in 1889 and was designed and built by local builder-architect Montezuma Fuller. It was listed on the National Register of Historic Places in 1985.
