= Ephraim B. Potter House =

Historic house in New York, United States

- U.S. National Register of Historic Places
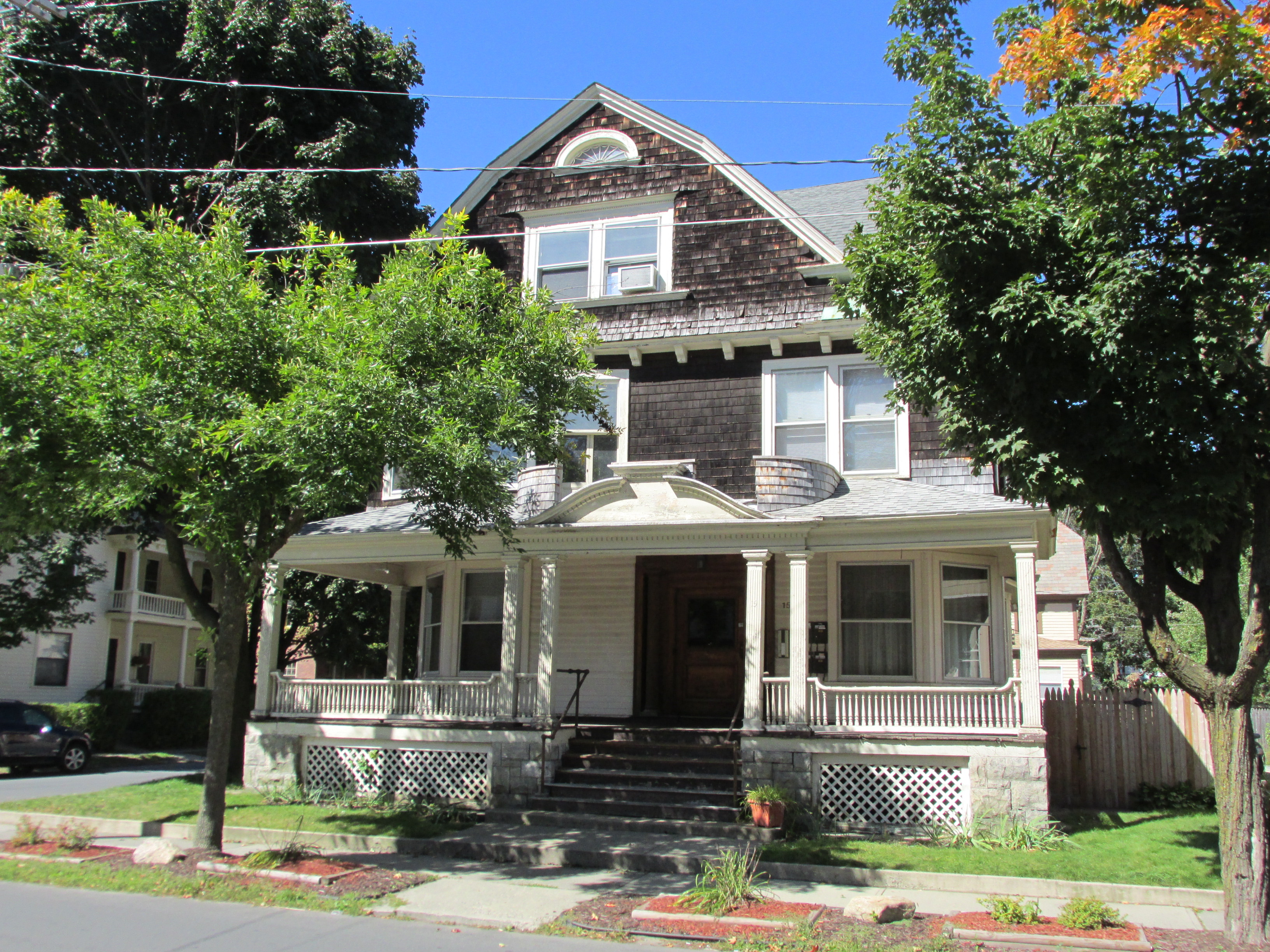
- Ephraim B. Potter House

- Location within New York Location within the United States
- Location: 15 Sherman Ave., Glens Falls, New York
- Coordinates: 43°18′41″N 73°39′6″W
- Area: less than one acre
- Built: 1900
- Architect: Potter, Ephraim B.
- Architectural style: Colonial Revival, Queen Anne
- MPS: Potter, Ephraim B., Buildings TR
- NRHP reference No.: 84003391
- Added to NRHP: September 29, 1984

Ephraim B. Potter House is a historic residence located in Glens Falls, Warren County, New York, United States. Constructed around 1900, this square, 2½-story frame residence blends transitional Queen Anne- / Colonial Revival design elements. The house is topped with a gambrel roof and features a raised, one-story covered porch with a balustrade and a rounded entrance pediment. The architect was Ephraim Potter.

It was added to the National Register of Historic Places in 1984.
