= W. T. Cowles House =

Historic house in New York, United States

- W.T. Cowles House
- U.S. National Register of Historic Places
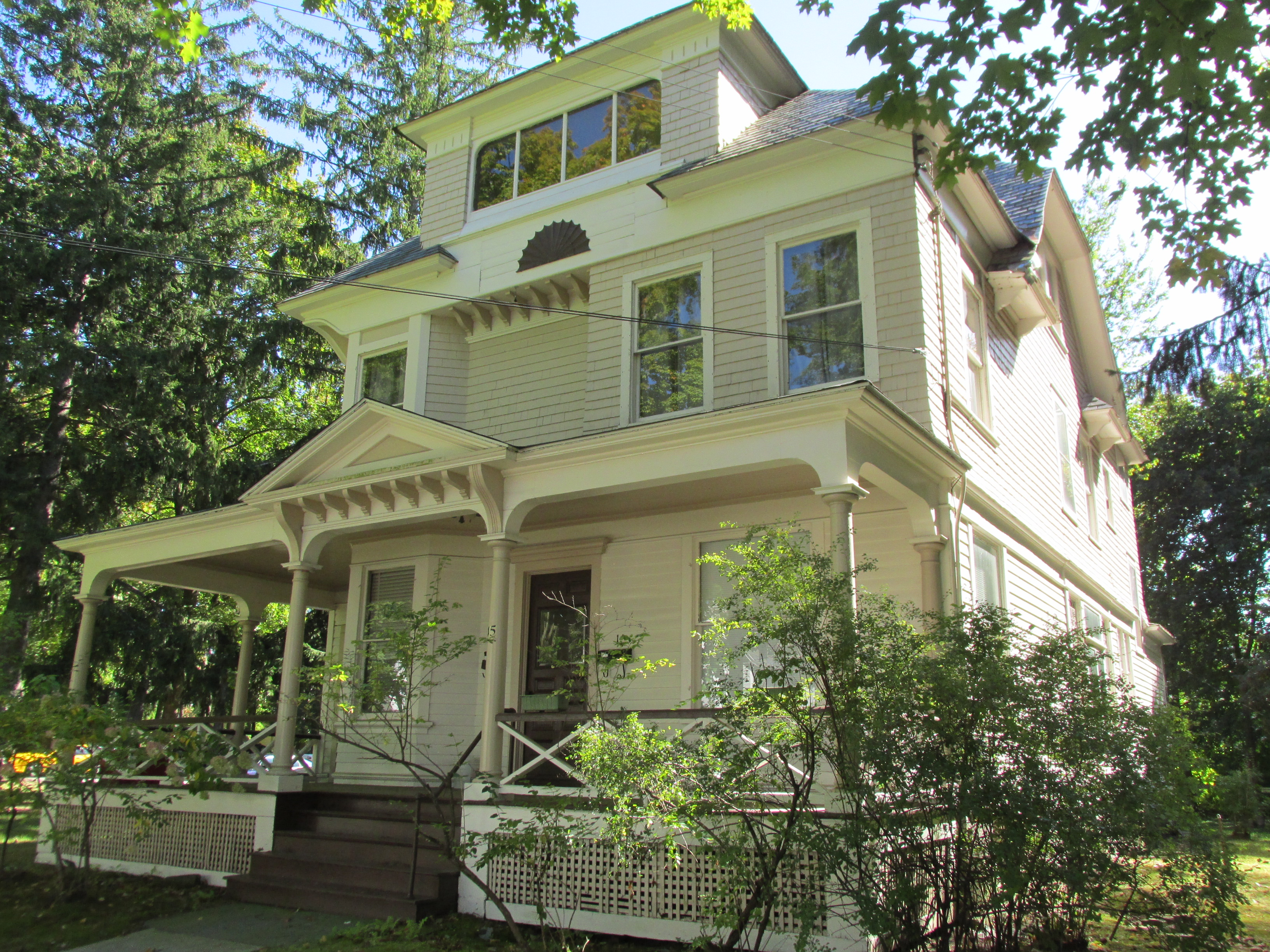

- Location within New York Location within the United States
- Location: 43–47 William St., Glens Falls, New York
- Coordinates: 43°19′3″N 73°38′41″W
- Area: less than one acre
- Built: 1897
- Architect: Potter, Ephraim B.
- Architectural style: Colonial Revival, Queen Anne
- MPS: Potter, Ephraim B., Buildings TR
- NRHP reference No.: 84003255
- Added to NRHP: September 29, 1984

The W. T. Cowles House is a historic house located at 43–47 William Street in Glens Falls, Warren County, New York.

== Description and history ==
It was built in 1897 and is a rectangular, 2 1/2-story, vernacular Queen Anne–style residence. It features a porch and roof with gable and jerkin head dormers. It also has some Colonial Revival style design elements. It was designed by architect and Glen Falls native Ephraim B. Potter (1855–1925).

It was added to the National Register of Historic Places on September 29, 1984.

== See also ==
- National Register of Historic Places listings in Warren County, New York
