= Ephraim Potter =

American architect

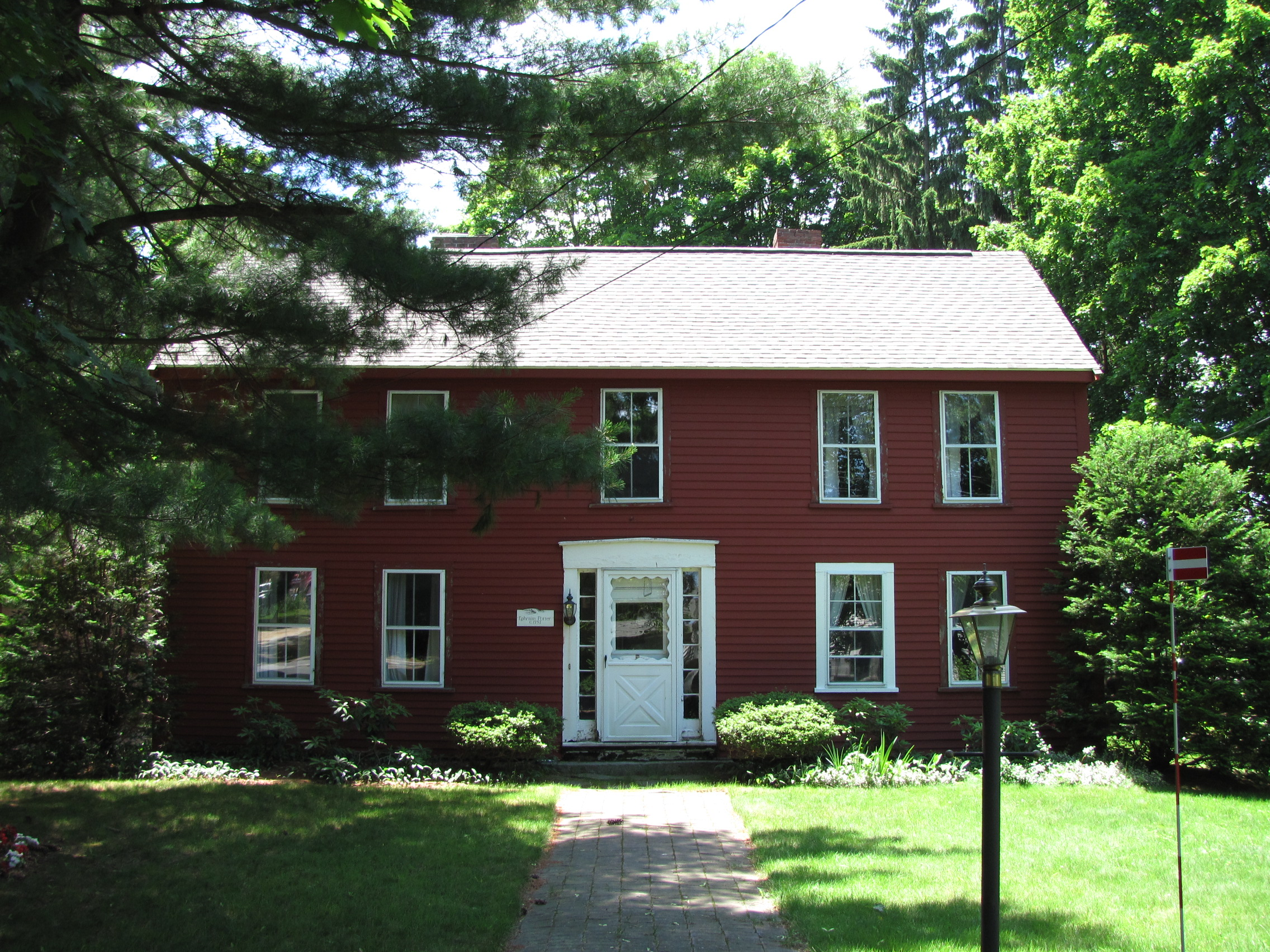
Ephraim Potter House, Concord, MA

Ephraim Potter (1855–1925) was an American architect from Glens Falls, New York.

A number of his works are listed on the U.S. National Register of Historic Places.

Works include (with attribution):

- Ephraim B. Potter House, Glens Falls, Warren County, New York. Built c. 1900. (Potter, Ephraim B.), NRHP-listed
- Bemis Eye Sanitarium Complex, Glen St. Glens Falls, NY (Potter, Ephraim B.), NRHP-listed
- Thomas Burnham House, 195 Ridge St. Glens Falls, NY (Potter, Ephraim B.), NRHP-listed
- W.T. Cowles House, 43-47 William St. Glens Falls, NY (Potter, Ephraim B.), NRHP-listed
- The former Glens Falls High School, 421-433 Glen St. Glens Falls, NY (Potter, Ephraim B.), NRHP-listed
- John E. Parry House, 146 Warren St. Glens Falls, NY (Potter, Ephraim B.), NRHP-listed
- Peyser and Morrison Shirt Company Building, 211-217 Warren St. Glens Falls, NY (Potter, Ephraim B.), NRHP-listed
- Martin L. C. Wilmarth House, 528 Glen St. Glens Falls, NY (Potter, Ephraim B.), NRHP-listed
- Helen Wing House, 126 Warren St. Glens Falls, NY (Potter, Ephraim B.), NRHP-listed
- The Shirt Factory, corner of Lawrence and Cooper Streets, Glens Falls, NY
