= Peter Anderson House =

Historic house in Colorado, United States

- U.S. National Register of Historic Places
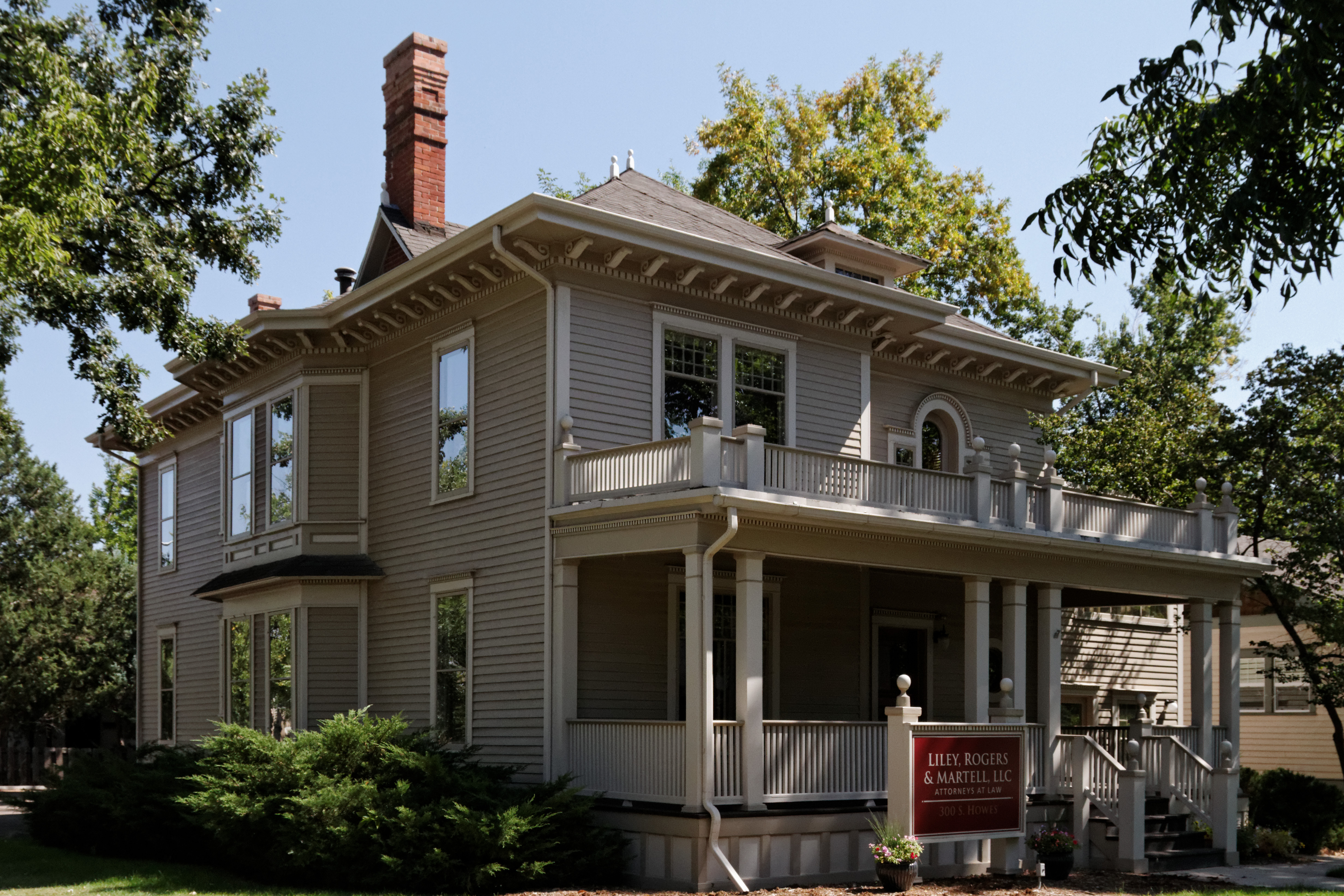
- (2012)

- Location within Colorado
- Location: 300 S. Howes Street; Fort Collins, Colorado
- Coordinates: 40°35′2″N 105°4′47″W
- Built: 1901
- Built by: Thomas Garnick
- Architect: Montezuma Fuller
- NRHP reference No.: 79000614
- Added to NRHP: October 25, 1979

The Peter Anderson House is a historic house built in 1901, located at 300 South Howes Street in Fort Collins, Colorado. It was listed on the National Register of Historic Places in 1979.

The house was designed by Montezuma Fuller and was built by Thomas Garnick. Its main rectangular area is about 29 by 45 feet (8.8 m × 13.7 m) in plan and it has an 11 by 23 feet (3.4 m × 7.0 m) wing on the south side. It has a sandstone and wood exterior and a hipped roof.

== See also ==
- National Register of Historic Places listings in Larimer County, Colorado
