= Martin L. C. Wilmarth House =

Historic house in New York, United States

- U.S. National Register of Historic Places
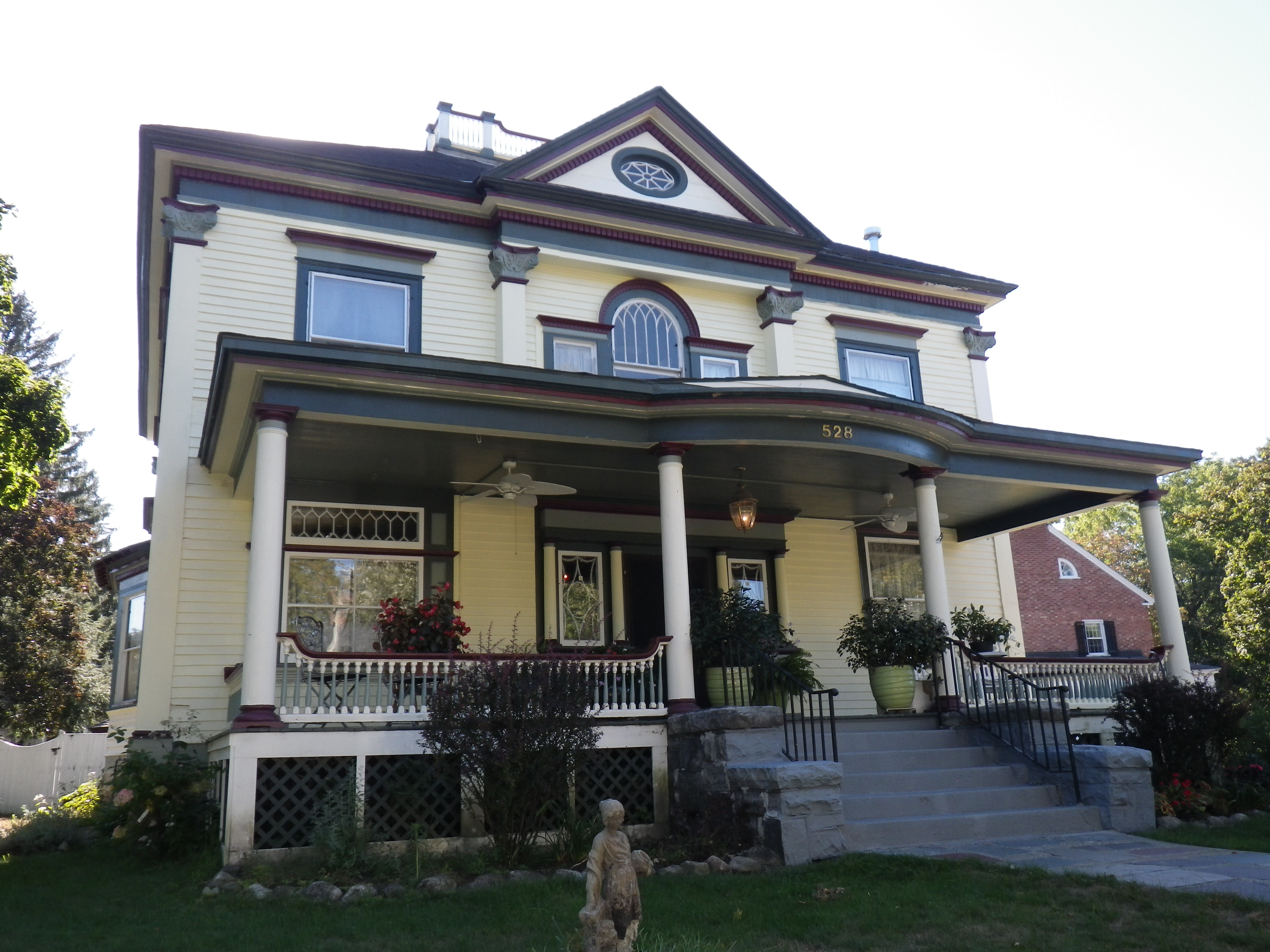

- Location within New York Location within the United States
- Location: 528 Glen St., Glens Falls, New York
- Coordinates: 43°19′5″N 73°39′26″W
- Area: less than one acre
- Built: 1910
- Architect: Potter, Ephraim B.
- Architectural style: Colonial Revival
- MPS: Potter, Ephraim B., Buildings TR
- NRHP reference No.: 84003423
- Added to NRHP: September 29, 1984

Martin L. C. Wilmarth House is a historic home located at Glens Falls, Warren County, New York. It was built about 1910 and is a square, 2-story, frame Colonial Revival–style residence. It is topped by a hipped roof with decorative balustrade. The architect was Ephraim Potter. Also on the property is a 1 1/2-story frame carriage house.

It was added to the National Register of Historic Places in 1984.
