= First United Presbyterian Church (Loveland, Colorado) =

- U.S. National Register of Historic Places
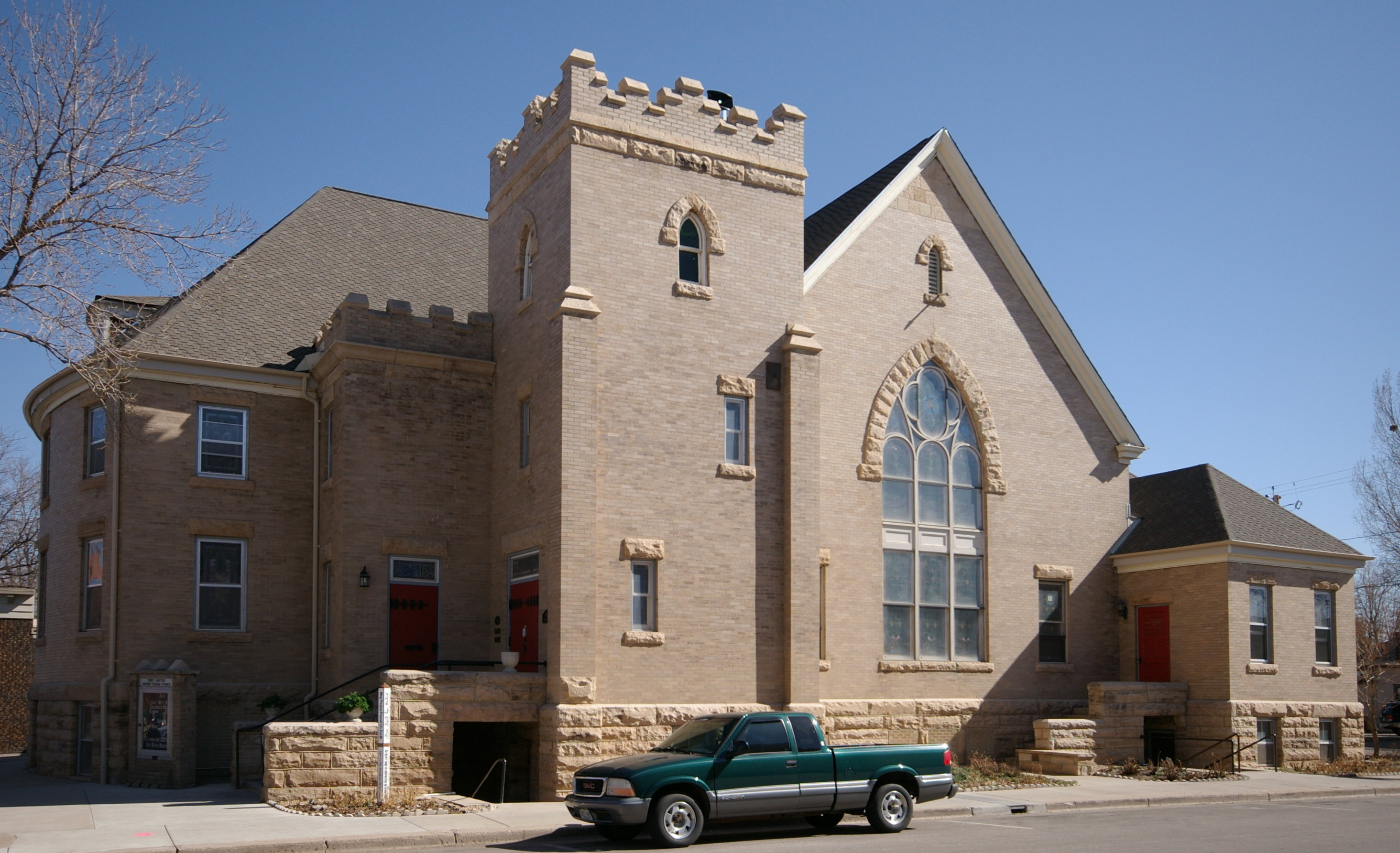

- Location within Colorado Location within the United States
- Location: 400 E. 4th St., Loveland, Colorado
- Coordinates: 40°23′43″N 105°4′16″W
- Area: less than one acre
- Built: 1906
- Architect: Montezuma Fuller
- Architectural style: Romanesque Revival, Gothic Revival, Akron Plan
- NRHP reference No.: 04000664
- Added to NRHP: July 7, 2004

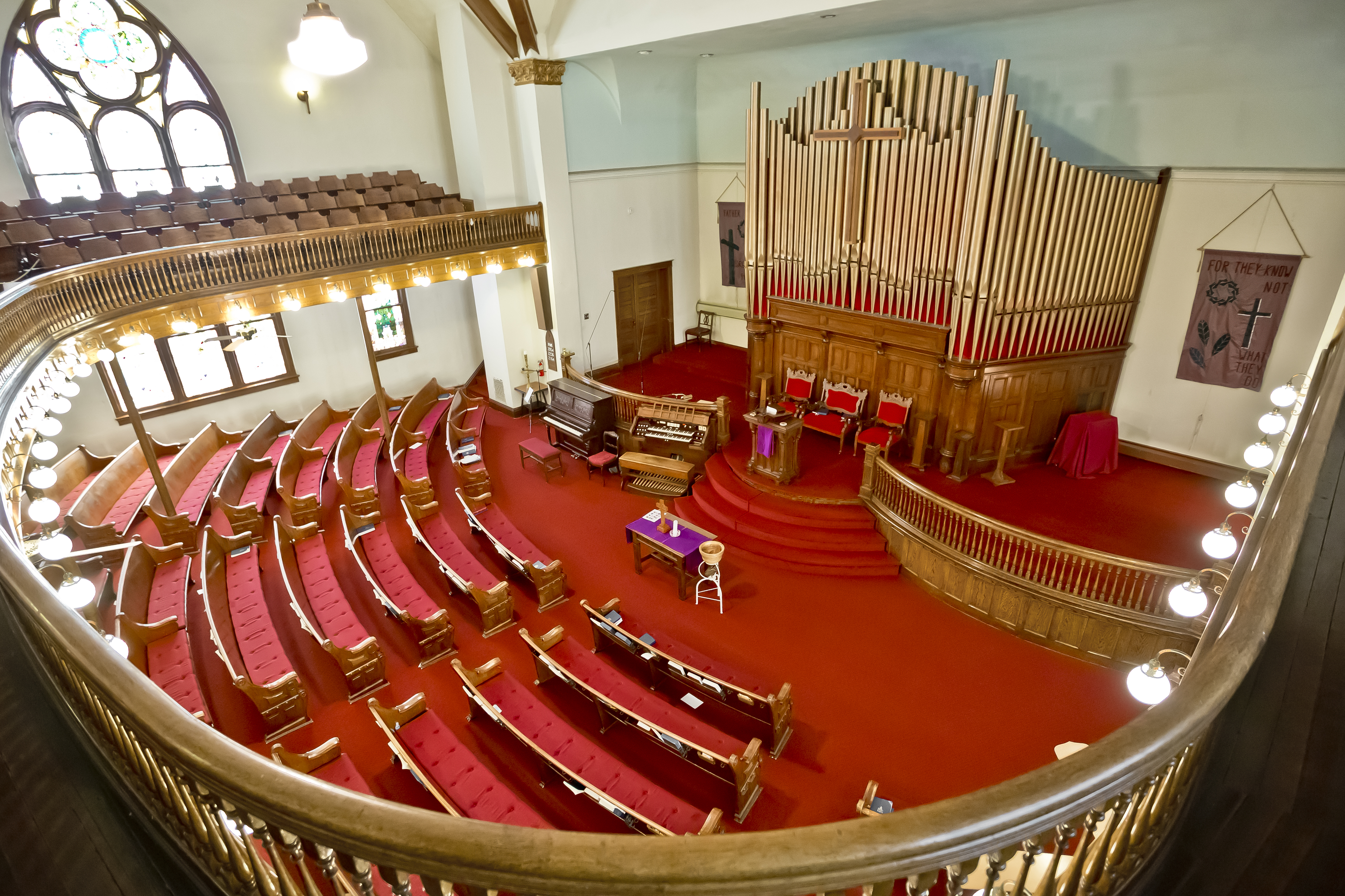
Interior of Sanctuary

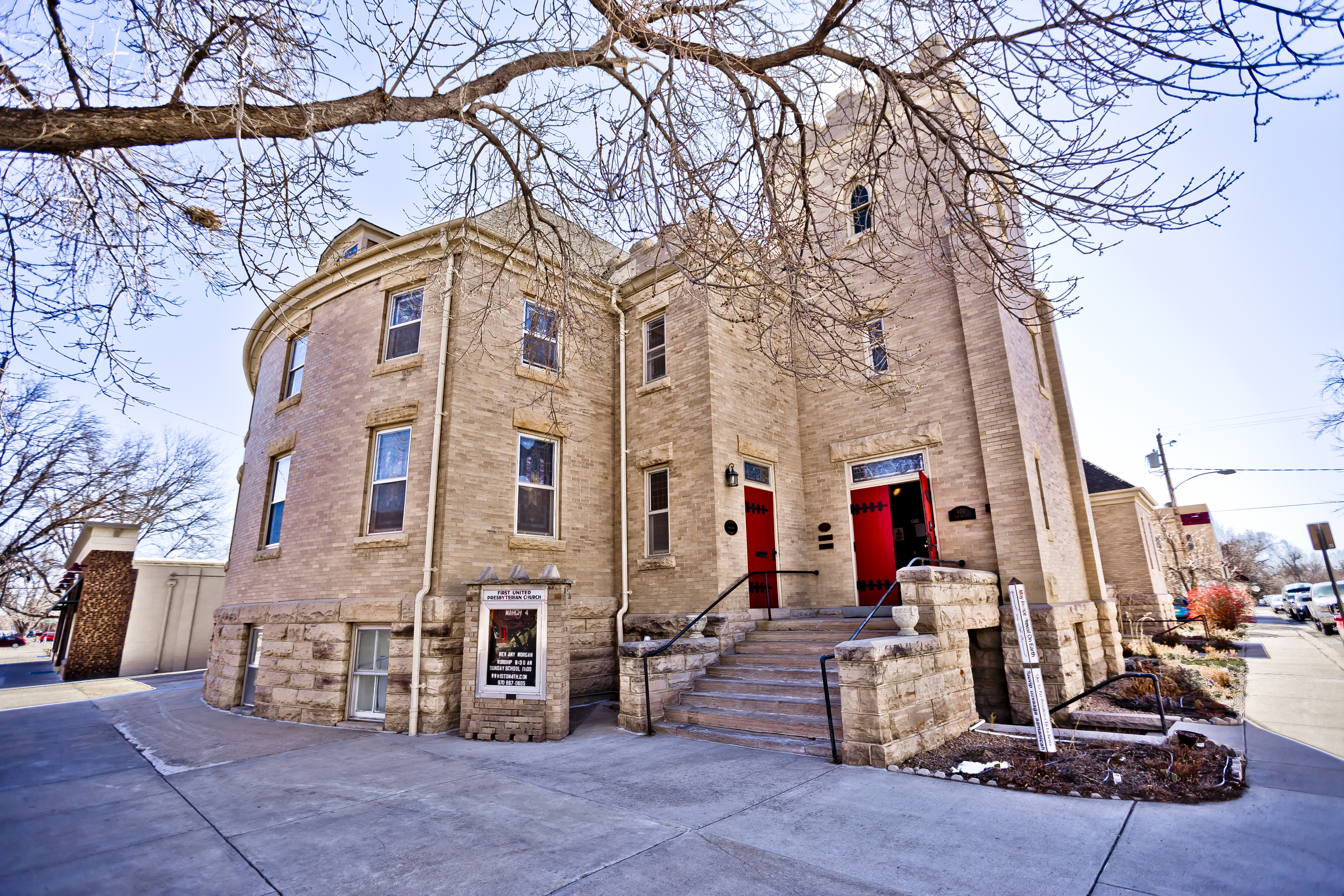
First United Presbyterian Church - Loveland, Colorado (pictured in March of 2018)

The First United Presbyterian Church at 400 E. 4th St. in Loveland, Colorado was built in 1905. It was designed by architect Montezuma Fuller. It was listed on the National Register of Historic Places in 2004.

It was designed by architect Montezuma Fuller with an Akron Plan interior and an exterior having elements of Romanesque Revival and Gothic Revival styles.
