= Laurel School Historic District =

Historic district in Colorado, United States

- U.S. National Register of Historic Places
- U.S. Historic district
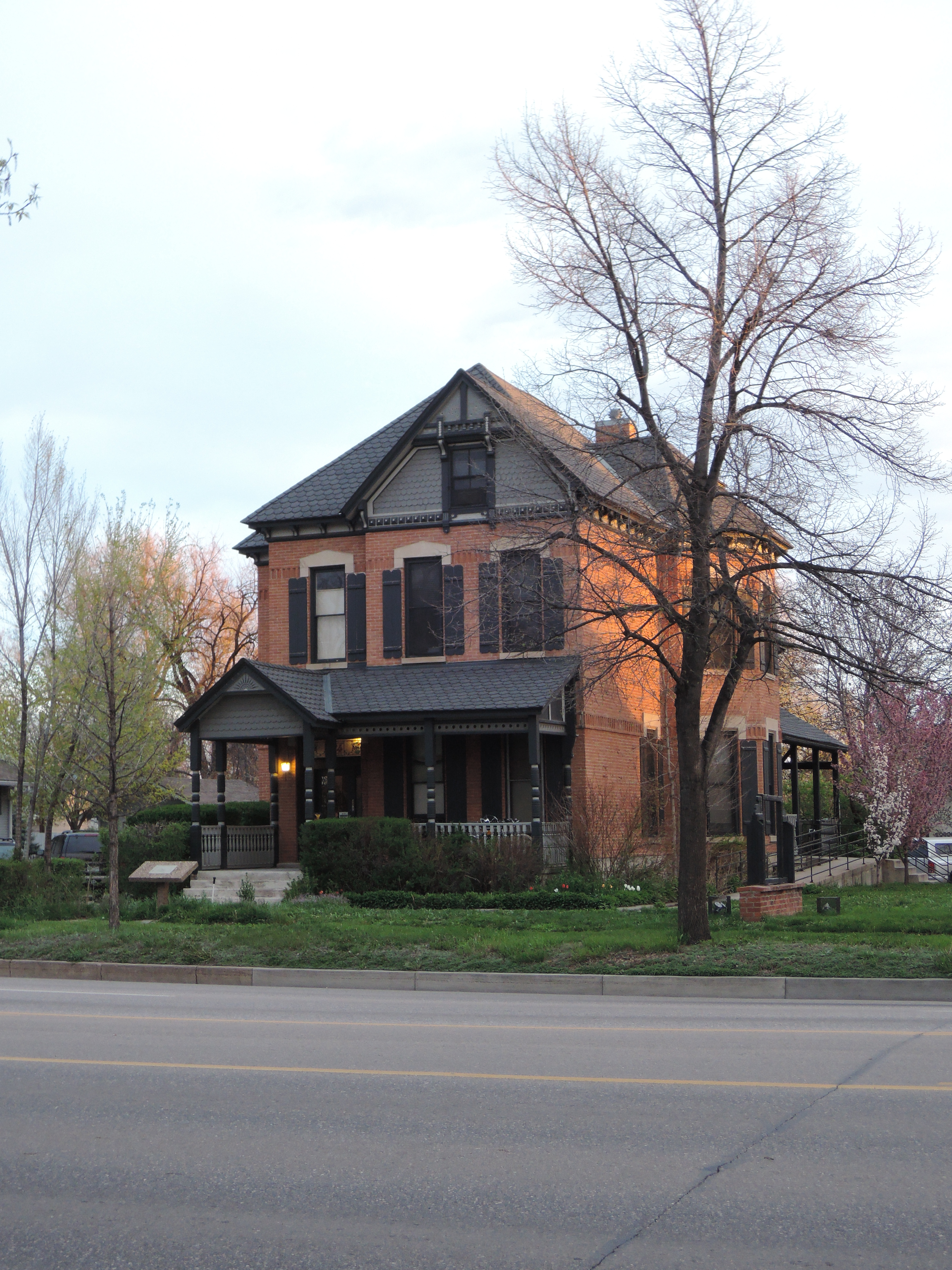
- c. 1882 home of James B. and Mary Arthur House

- Location within Colorado Location within the United States
- Location: Off U.S. 287, Fort Collins, Colorado, United States
- Coordinates: 40.578°N 105.073°W
- Area: 217 acres (0.88 km^{2})
- Architect: Montezuma Fuller; et al.
- Architectural style: Bungalow/craftsman, Late Victorian
- NRHP reference No.: 80000909
- Added to NRHP: October 3, 1980

The Laurel School Historic District is a 217-acre (88 ha) historic district in Fort Collins, Colorado, United States. It includes works by Montezuma Fuller and other architects, including Bungalow/craftsman architecture and Late Victorian architecture. This district is a residential area that reflects the features of a middle class farming community that developed in Fort Collins in the late nineteenth and twentieth centuries.

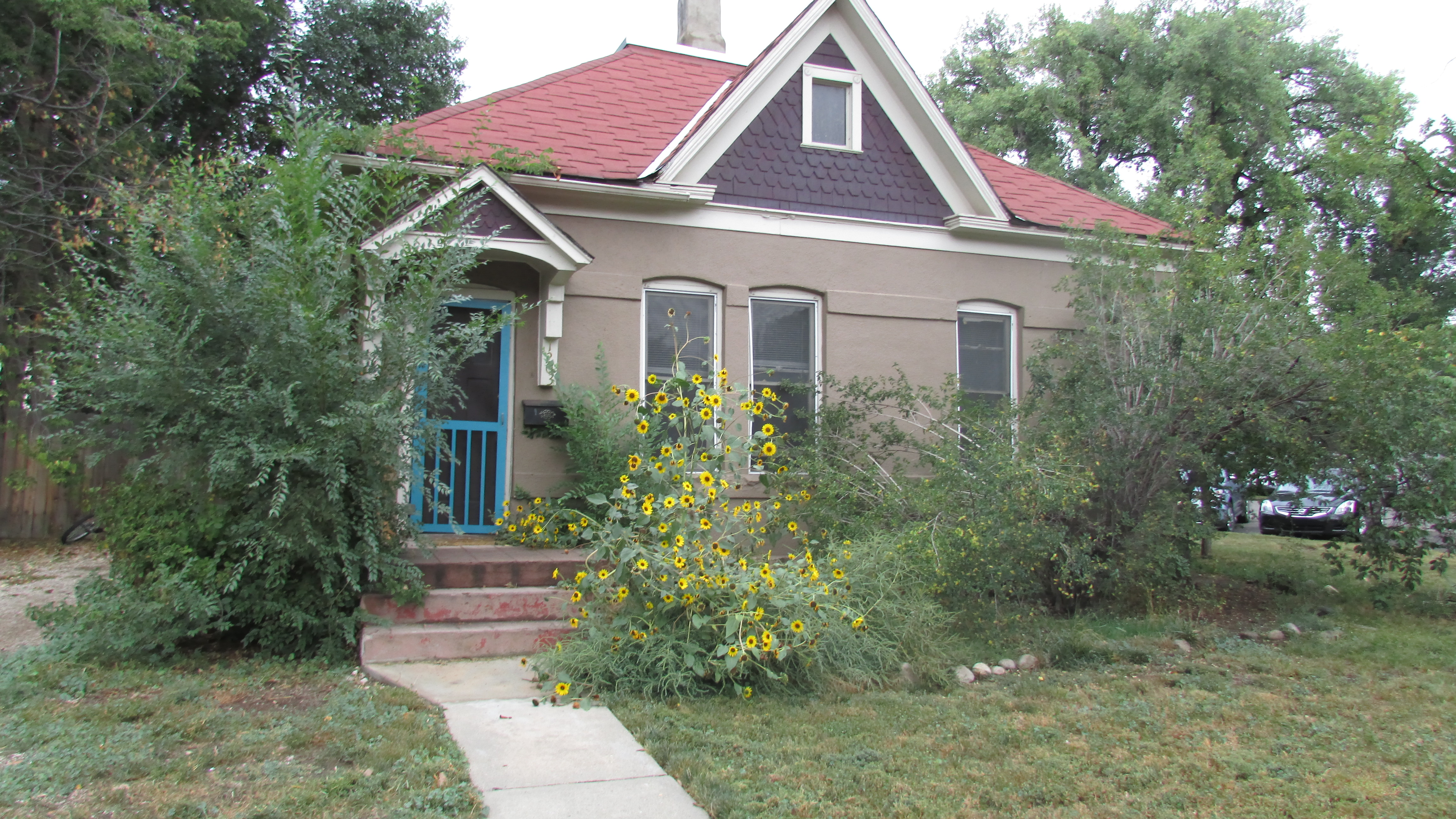
c. 1897 home in the Laurel School Historic District

It was listed on the National Register of Historic Places in 1980. It also has been known as, or includes, the Midtown Historic District, Midtown, and Laurel School. The listing included 549 contributing buildings.

The district includes six or more works by builder-architect Montezuma Fuller, including the Laurel School.
