= John E. Parry House =

Historic house in New York, United States

- U.S. National Register of Historic Places
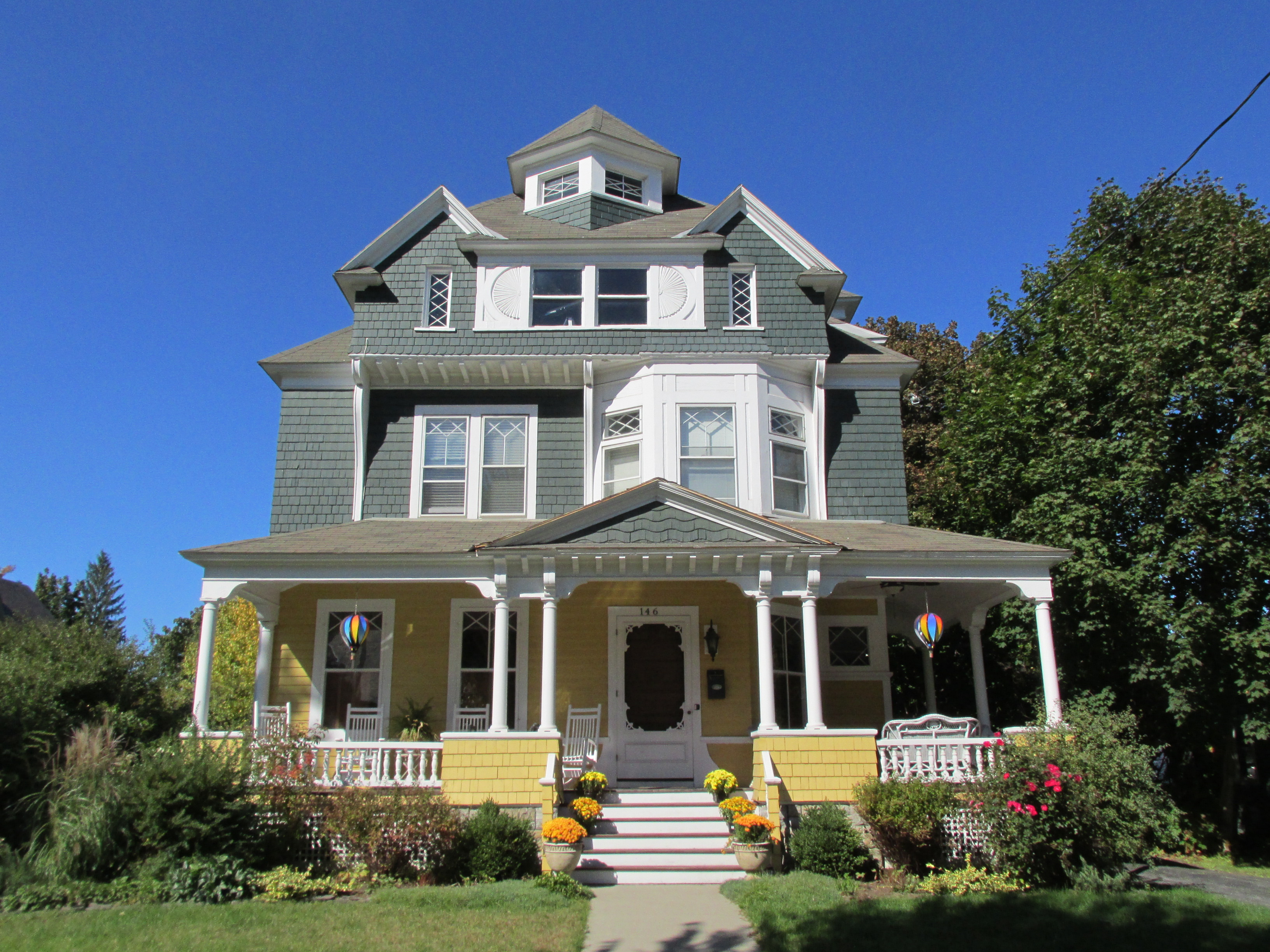
- John E. Parry House

- Location within New York Location within the United States
- Location: 146 Warren St., Glens Falls, New York
- Coordinates: 43°18′38″N 73°38′10″W
- Area: less than one acre
- Built: 1890
- Architect: Potter, Ephraim B.
- Architectural style: Colonial Revival, Queen Anne
- MPS: Potter, Ephraim B., Buildings TR
- NRHP reference No.: 84003382
- Added to NRHP: September 29, 1984

John E. Parry House is a historic home located at Glens Falls, Warren County, New York. It was built about 1890 and is a rectangular 2 1/2-story frame residence that incorporates transitional Queen Anne / Colonial Revival–style design elements. The house incorporates stone, clapboards, and shingles in its exterior. It features a broad, bracketed porch with pediment. The architect was Ephraim Potter.

It was added to the National Register of Historic Places in 1984.
