= Peyser and Morrison Shirt Company Building =

- U.S. National Register of Historic Places
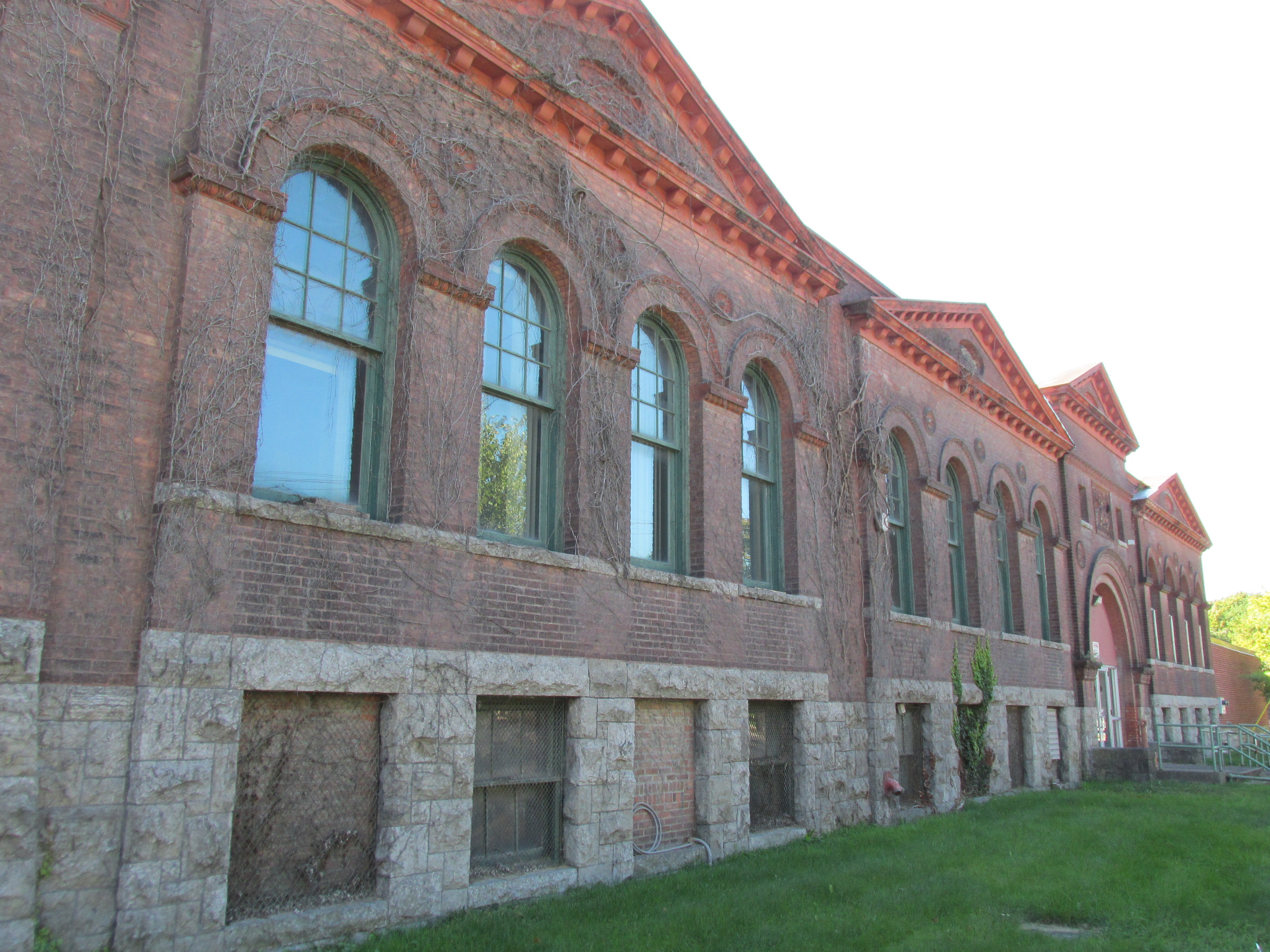
- Peyser and Morrison Shirt Company Building

- Location within New York Location within the United States
- Location: 211-217 Warren St., Glens Falls, New York
- Coordinates: 43°18′36″N 73°37′50″W
- Area: 1 acre (0.40 ha)
- Built: 1893
- Architect: Potter, Ephraim B.
- Architectural style: Romanesque
- MPS: Potter, Ephraim B., Buildings TR
- NRHP reference No.: 84003388
- Added to NRHP: September 29, 1984

Peyser and Morrison Shirt Company Building is a historic industrial building located at Glens Falls, Warren County, New York. It was built in 1893 and is a square, two story brick industrial structure with a highly embellished street facade in the Romanesque style. It is the only extant industrial structure designed by prominent local architect Ephraim B. Potter (1855-1925).

It was added to the National Register of Historic Places in 1984.
