= Montezuma Fuller House =

Historic house in Colorado, United States

- U.S. National Register of Historic Places
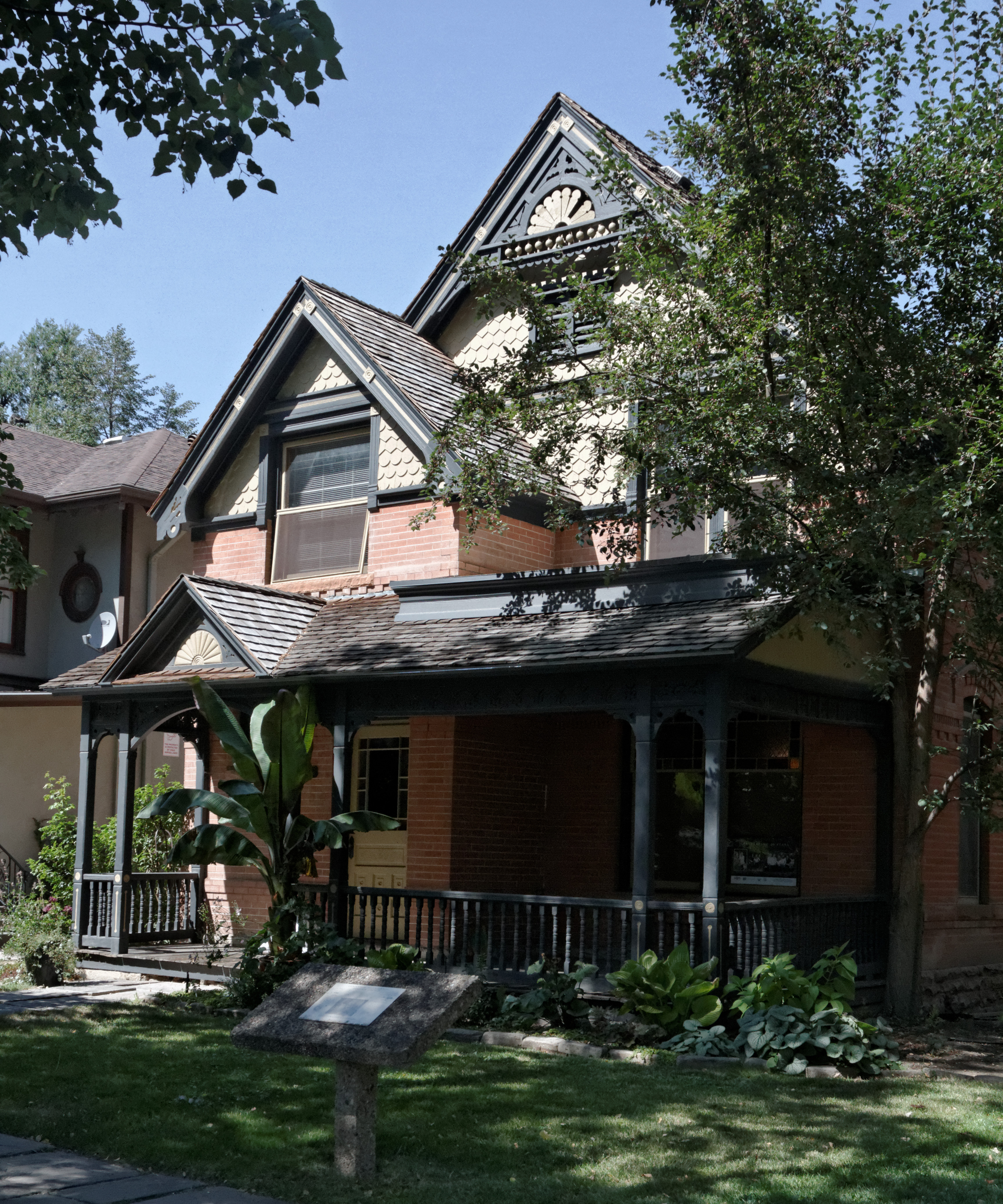

- Location within Colorado Location within the United States
- Location: 226 W. Magnolia St., Fort Collins, Colorado
- Coordinates: 40°34′58″N 105°4′47″W
- Area: 0.1 acres (0.040 ha)
- Built: 1894-95
- Architect: Fuller, Montezuma
- Architectural style: Queen Anne
- NRHP reference No.: 78000869
- Added to NRHP: December 15, 1978

The Montezuma Fuller House at 226 W. Magnolia St. in Fort Collins, Colorado was built in 1894. It is a Queen Anne style house designed by architect Montezuma Fuller. It was listed on the National Register of Historic Places (NRHP) in 1978.

According to its NRHP nomination, the house "is significant for its association with its designer, builder, and first inhabitant, Montezuma Fuller, the most important of Fort Collins' early architects. The house itself is an excellent example of Fuller's residential style of architecture which combined Queen Anne and Eastlake elements, and is also significant for its craftsmanship and detailing."
