= William Andrews House =

- U.S. National Register of Historic Places
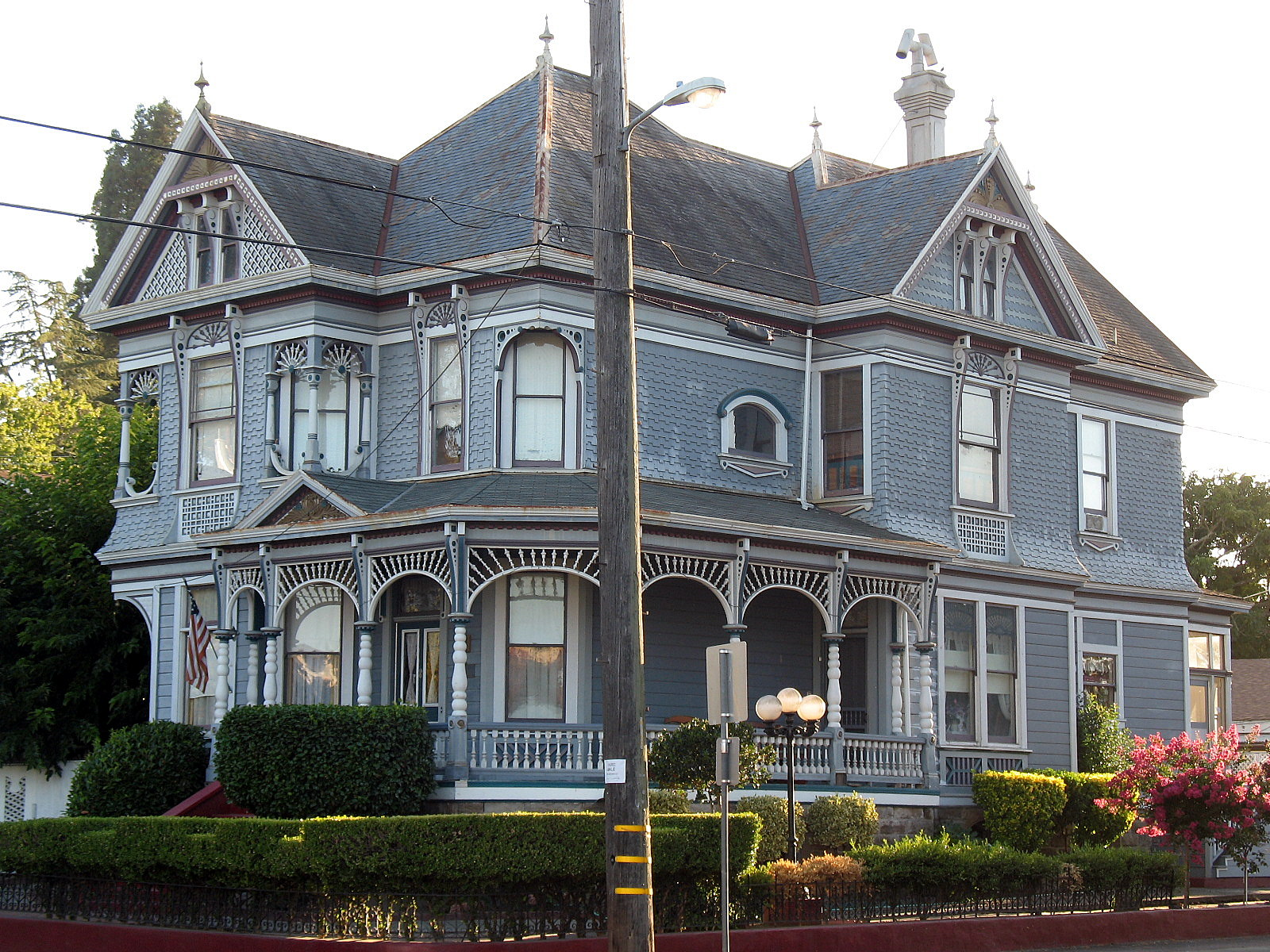

- Location within California Location within the United States
- Location: 741 Seminary St., Napa, California
- Coordinates: 38°17′43″N 122°17′27″W
- Area: less than one acre
- Built: 1892
- Architect: Luther Mark Turton
- Architectural style: Queen Anne
- NRHP reference No.: 92000789
- Added to NRHP: June 18, 1992

The William Andrews House, at 741 Seminary St. in Napa, California, was built in 1892. It was listed on the National Register of Historic Places in 1992.

It is a two-and-a-half-story Queen Anne-style house.
