= Mosman House =

Historic house in Colorado, United States

- U.S. National Register of Historic Places
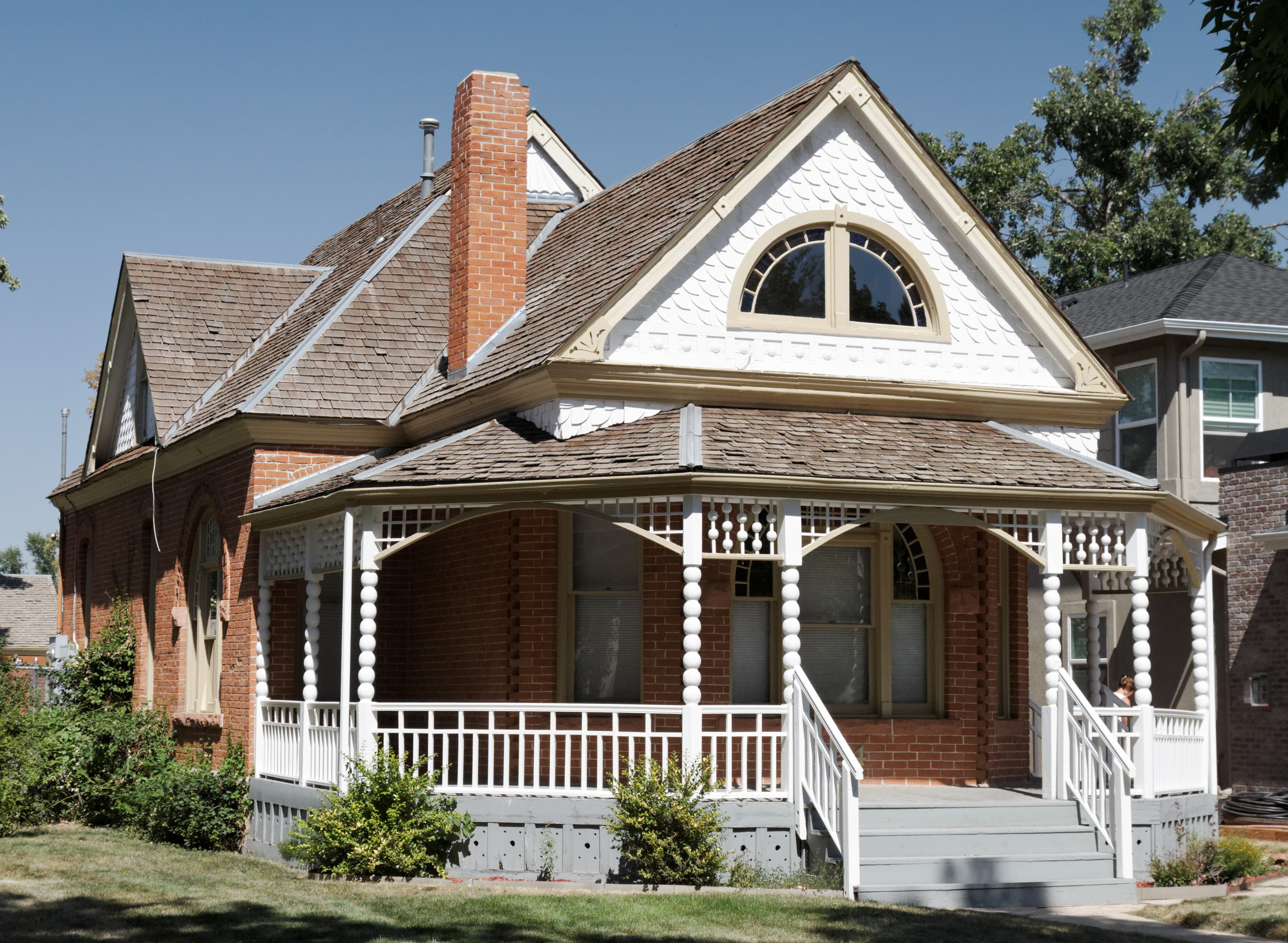

- Location within Colorado Location within the United States
- Location: 324 E. Oak St., Fort Collins, Colorado
- Coordinates: 40°35′8″N 105°4′21″W
- Area: 0.2 acres (0.081 ha)
- Built: c.1892
- Architect: Fuller, Montezuma
- Architectural style: Late Victorian
- NRHP reference No.: 78000865
- Added to NRHP: December 15, 1978

The Mosman House at 324 E. Oak St. in Fort Collins, Colorado was designed by architect Montezuma Fuller and was built in 1892 or 1893. It has also been known as the Andrews House. It was listed on the National Register of Historic Places (NRHP) in 1978.

According to its NRHP nomination, the house is "primarily significant as an outstanding example of Victorian architecture in the City of Fort Collins".
