= French–Andrews House =

Historic house in Massachusetts, United States

- U.S. National Register of Historic Places
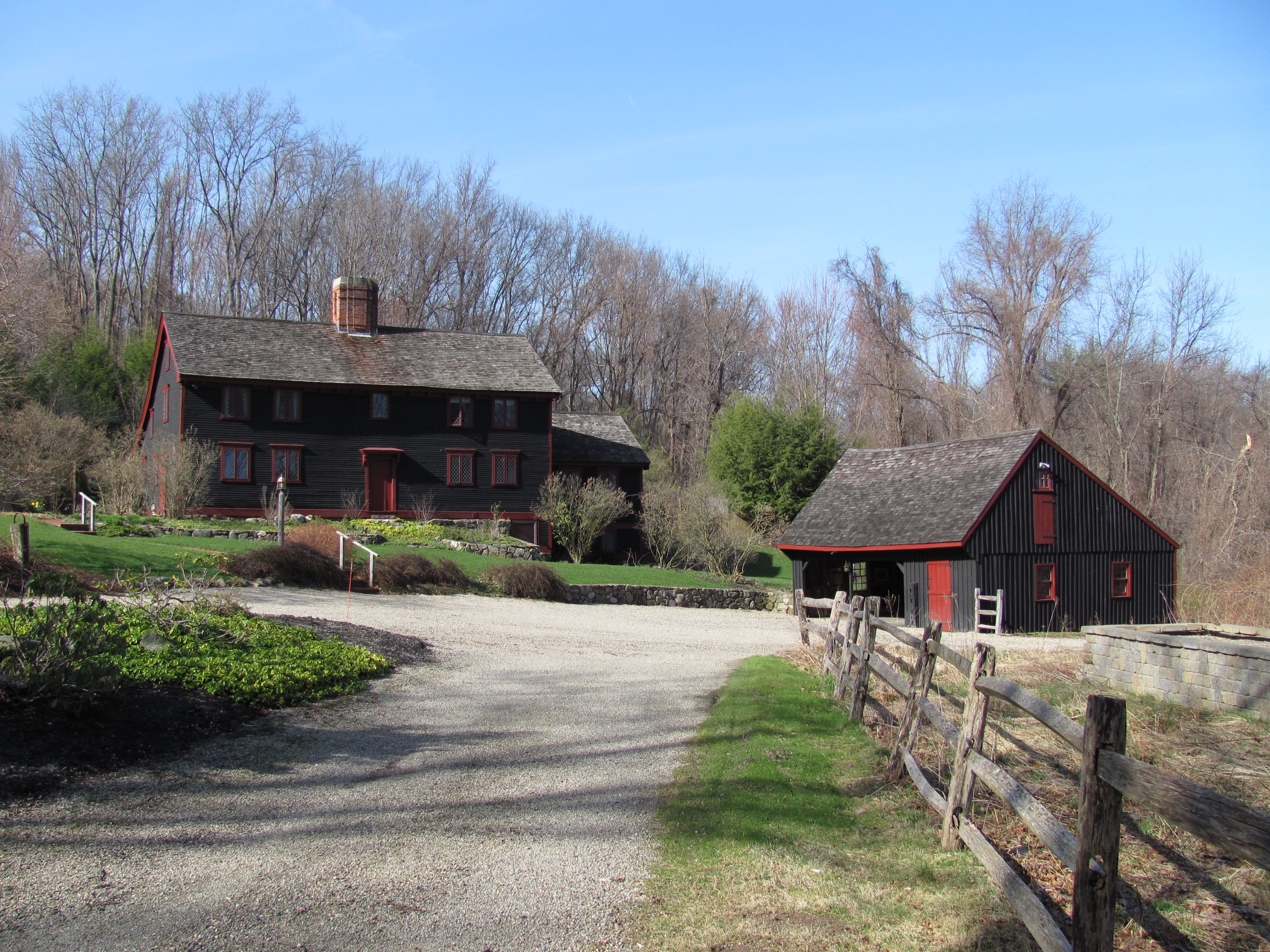
- French–Andrews House

- Location within Massachusetts Location within the United States
- Location: 86 Howlett Street, Topsfield, Massachusetts
- Coordinates: 42°38′33″N 70°56′18″W
- Built: 1718
- Architectural style: Colonial
- MPS: First Period Buildings of Eastern Massachusetts TR
- NRHP reference No.: 90000263
- Added to NRHP: March 9, 1990

The French–Andrews House is a historic First Period house in Topsfield, Massachusetts. The oldest elements of the house date to c. 1718, and exhibit construction techniques that are clearly derived from 17th century English methods found in other, older, First Period homes in Massachusetts. It is also notable for some surviving original decorative styling in its downstairs front rooms, and as the subject of early preservation work.

When built, the house was a 2 1/2-story timber-framed building two rooms wide and one deep, with a central chimney. It was probably built by Joseph Andrews, who purchased the property from John French Sr. In 1919 it underwent a careful restoration under the auspices of preservationist George Francis Dow. Stylistic changes and alterations made in intervening years were removed, and the timber framing was exposed. The in situ First Period decorative elements were preserved, and in some instances replicated in other parts of the house. Dow was also able to apply exterior siding in a manner that was virtually indistinguishable from period siding.

The house was listed on the National Register of Historic Places in 1990.

== See also ==
- List of the oldest buildings in Massachusetts
- National Register of Historic Places listings in Essex County, Massachusetts
