= Josiah Andrews House =

Historic house in Iowa, United States

- U.S. National Register of Historic Places
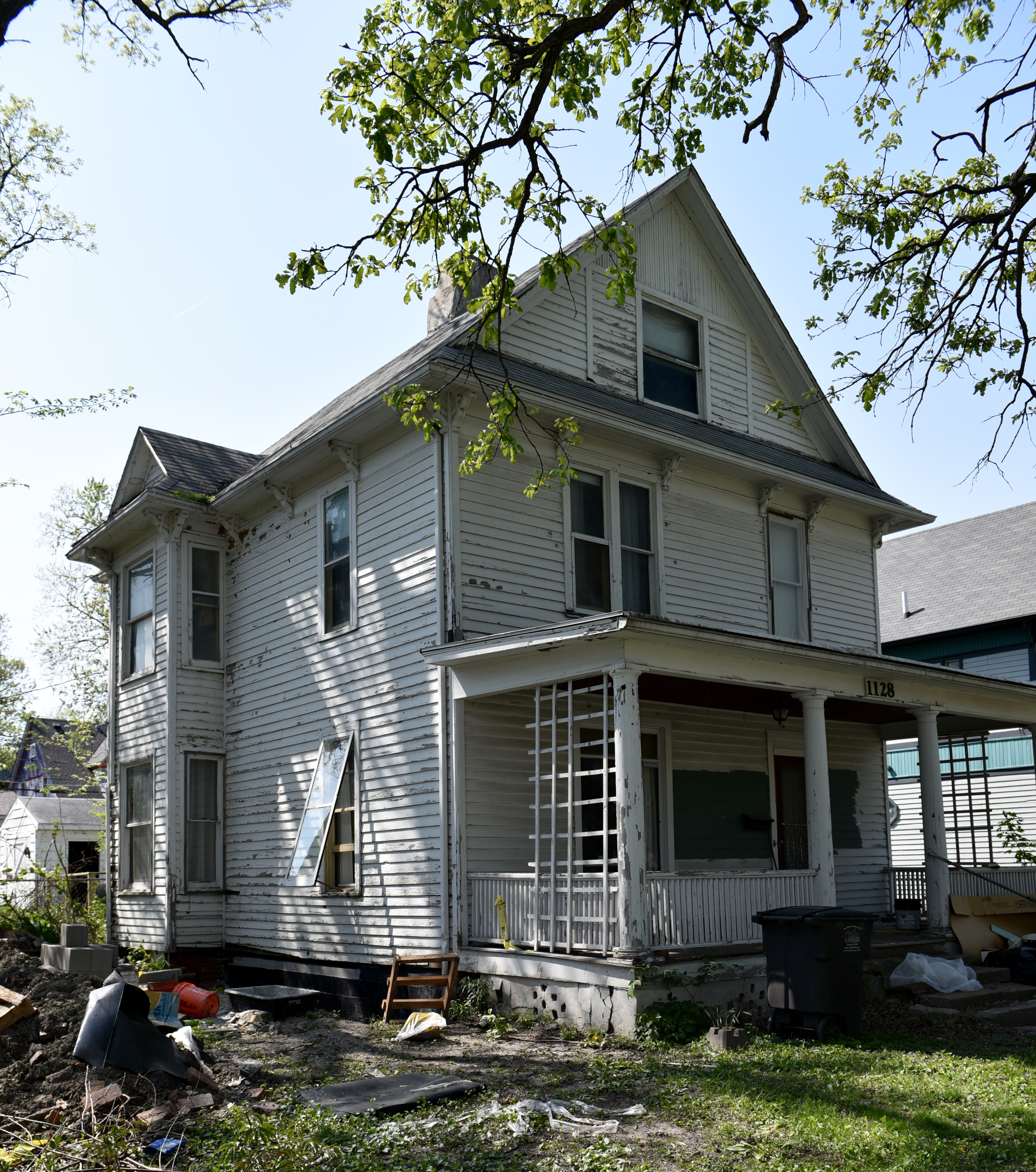

- Location within Iowa Location within the United States
- Location: 1128 27th St. Des Moines, Iowa
- Coordinates: 41°35′56.6″N 93°39′13″W
- Area: less than one acre
- Built: 1896
- Architectural style: Late Victorian
- MPS: Drake University and Related Properties in Des Moines, Iowa, 1881--1918 MPS
- NRHP reference No.: 88001338
- Added to NRHP: November 1, 1988

The Josiah Andrews House is a historic building located in Des Moines, Iowa, United States. It is a 2½-story, rectangular, frame, front gable dwelling. It features Stick Style strips on the gable end, and brackets along the cornice. The property on which it stands is part of one of ten plats that were owned by Drake University. The university sold the lot to J. and H.L. Andrews in 1896, and they built this house at that time. Its significance is attributed to the effect of the university's innovative financing techniques upon the settlement of the area around the campus. The house was listed on the National Register of Historic Places in 1988.
