= Joseph Andrews House =

Historic house in Massachusetts, United States

- U.S. National Register of Historic Places
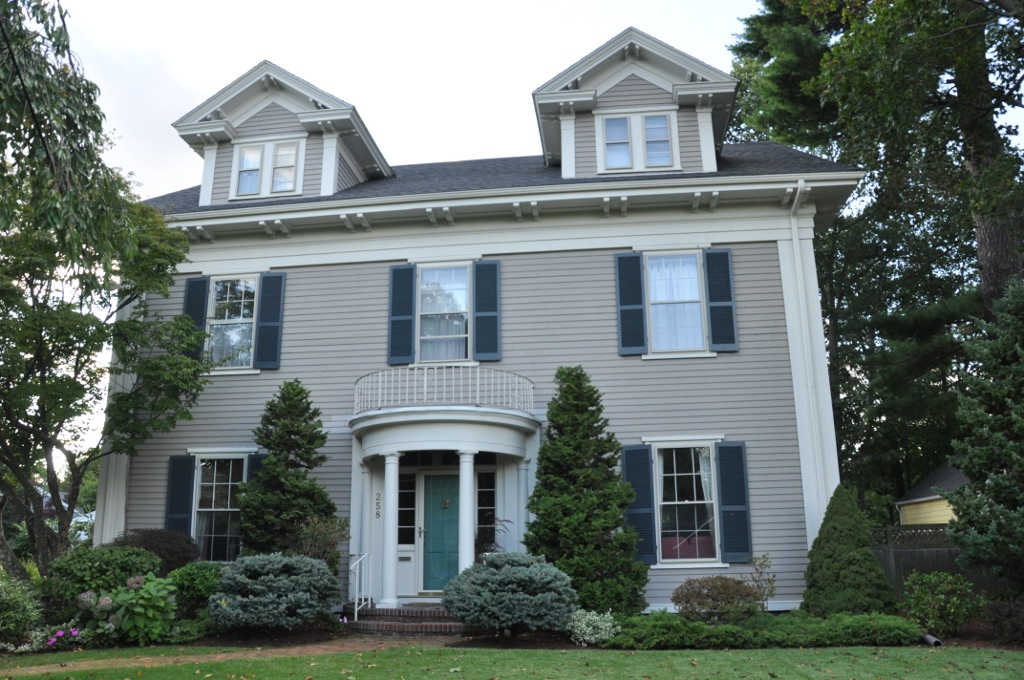

- Location within Massachusetts Location within the United States
- Location: 258 Linden St., Waltham, Massachusetts
- Coordinates: 42°23′0″N 71°13′4″W
- Built: 1851
- Architect: Harrington, Charles
- Architectural style: Italianate
- MPS: Waltham MRA
- NRHP reference No.: 89001554
- Added to NRHP: September 28, 1989

The Joseph Andrews House is a historic house at 258 Linden Street in Waltham, Massachusetts. Built in 1851, it is one of the city's oldest examples of Italianate architecture, and was one of the first houses built in Linden Street. It was listed on the National Register of Historic Places in 1989.

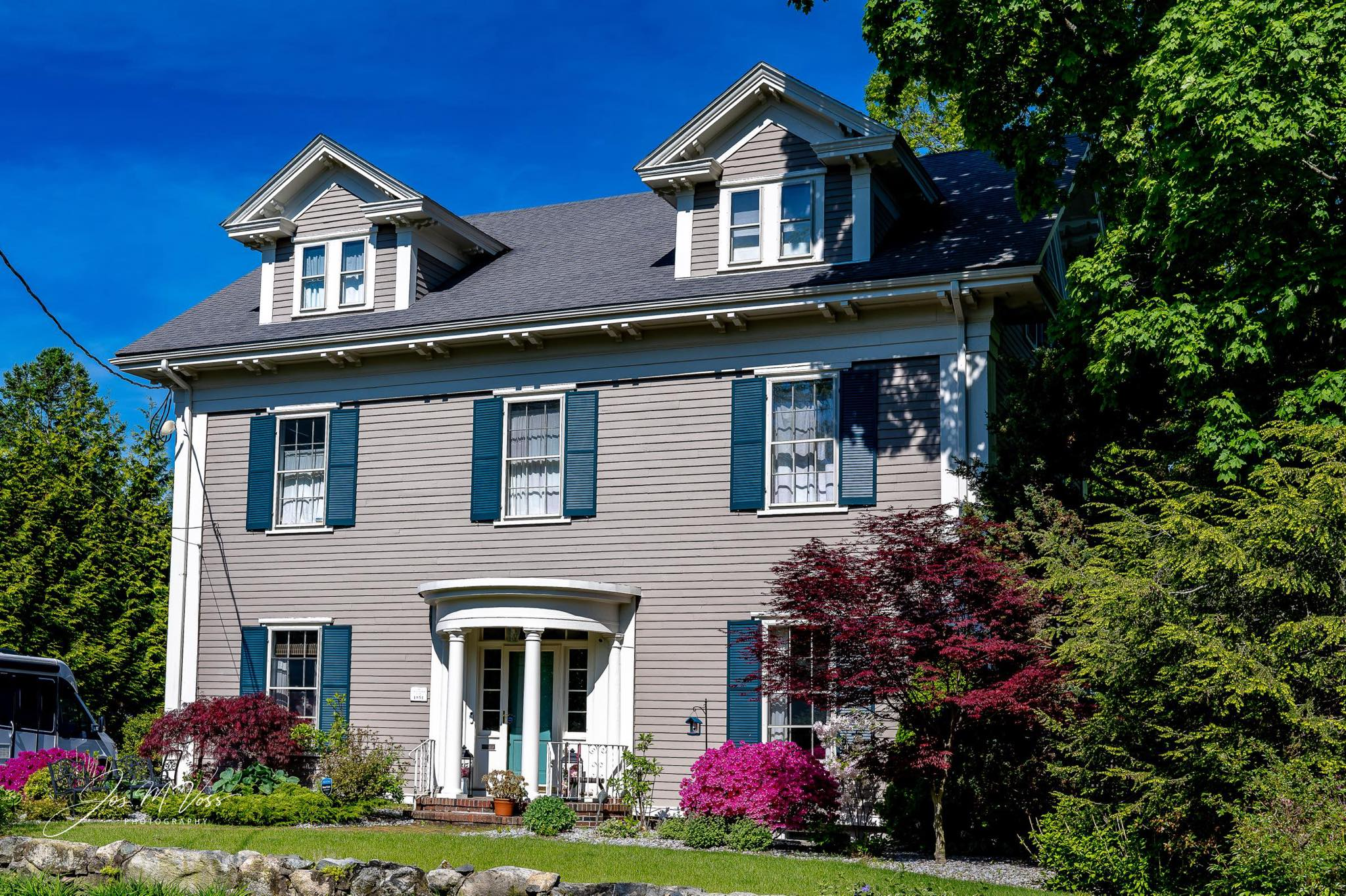
View of Joseph Andrews House in spring 2024

== Description and history ==
The Joseph Andrews House stands in a residential area just east of the campus of Bentley University, on the west side of Linden Street between Floral Drive and Linden Circle. It is a 2 1/2-story wood-frame structure, with a gabled roof and clapboarded exterior. It has Italianate styling, featuring wide eaves with paired brackets, paneled corner boards, and an entry framed by sidelight and transom windows.

The area that is now Linden Street was developed by Charles Harrington, who acquired land from the Lyman Estate 1845, and laid the street out through its middle. Harrington built this house about 1851 for Joseph Andrews, an elder in the local Swedenborgian Church; it was one of three houses he built on the street. It was originally set well back on a lot of nearly 4 acres (1.6 ha). That land was subdivided in the 1950's, when Cedar Hill Lane (just west of Linden Street) was laid out. The house was sold for a nominal amount to make way for other homes, then moved forward in its lot, removing its rear wings in the process. Prominent owners of the house include a superior court judge and the owner of Boston-based maker of agricultural implements.

Set in a residential area of predominantly recent twentieth century houses, this imposing center-entrance Italianate has been moved and has "lost-rear : ells . It nonetheless retains most of its original features; it is characterized by its wide overhanging eaves with paired brackets and deep corner returns on the gable ends. The prominent gabled dormers have similar deep corner returns. There is a cornice across the entire facade and paneled corner boards. The windows have simple corniced heads and the entrance has a transom and sidelights. The semicircular entrance porch with Tuscan columns and the two-story rear ell with a doorway with sidelights and an elliptical fanlight are Colonial Revival additions. The house is on a cement foundation, testimony to the fact that it was moved relatively recently.

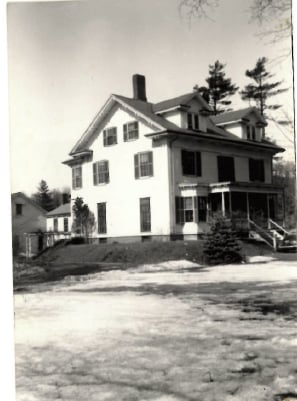
Old photo prior to 1950, of Joseph Andrews House on its original foundation.

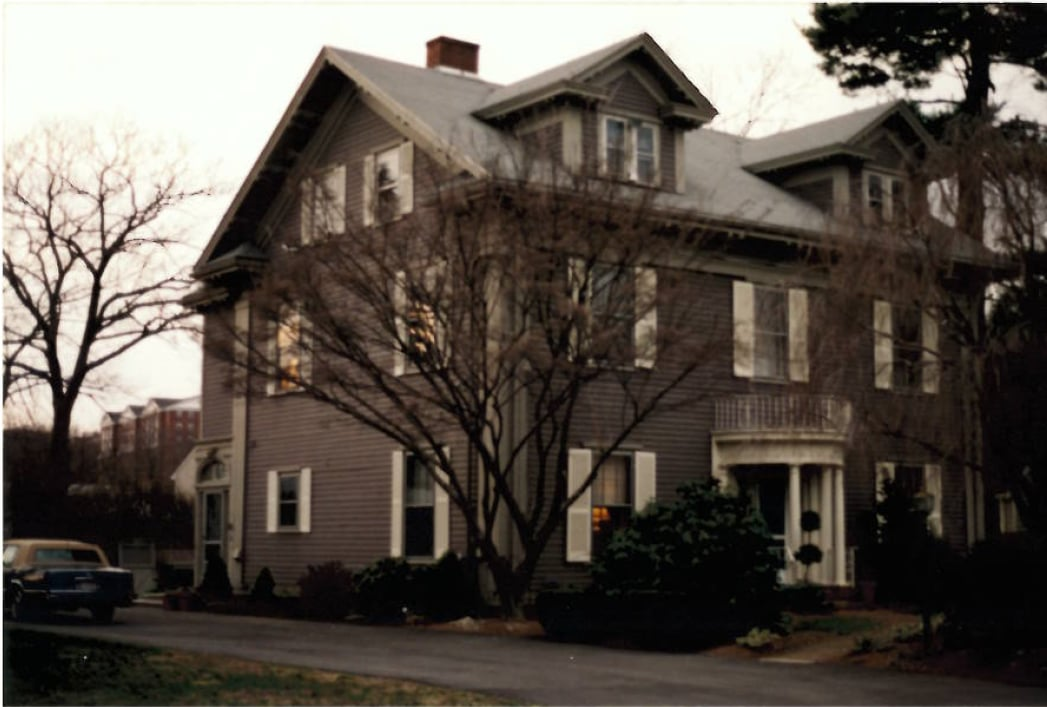
Older view of Joseph Andrews House in its current location.

This house was built in 1851 by Charles Harrington for Frances and Joseph Andrews. Harrington worked at the Bleachery but nonetheless also managed to be one of Waltham's important nineteenth century builders. In 1845 he purchased from George Lyman a large tract of land that extended from Beaver Street halfway to Main Street on either side of what is now Linden Street. He then laid out and constructed half of Linden Street (the Town built the rest) and built three houses, producing what could be considered one of Waltham's first suburban developments (see also 209 Linden Street form). Harrington believed that houses should be set well back from the street in order to give them "plenty of breathing room" and to provide wider avenues for travel (Waltham Free Press-Tribune, June 1, 1888). This house was originally located back about where the circle of Cedar Hill Lane is now, on a lot that was 3.9 acres.

The Andrews were apparently members of the New Jerusalem Church and moved to Waltham from West Roxbury in order to join the Swedenborgian congregation centered at Piety Corner (see 379 Lexington Street form). In the late 1850s Joseph Andrews was one of the leaders of the Church.

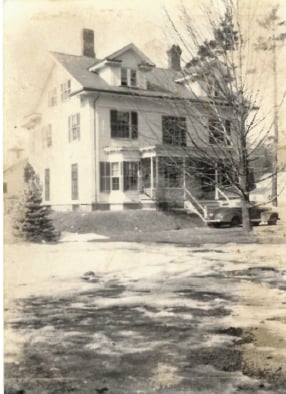
View of Joseph Andrews House with original chimneys and larger front Porch.

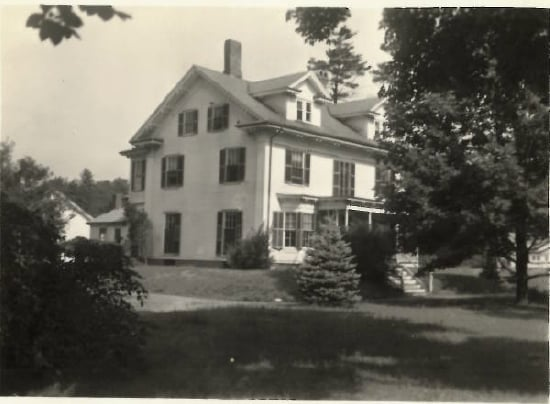
View of Joseph Andrews House as a dairy farm house, showing the extended porch, original chimneys and raised foundation.

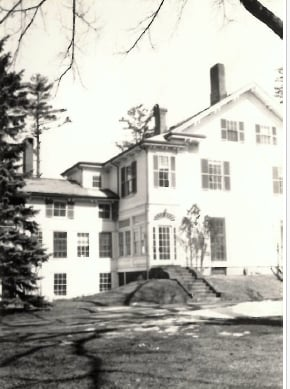
View of the south side of the house, including original Ell that was attached at the rear, but lost in the move forward on the lot.

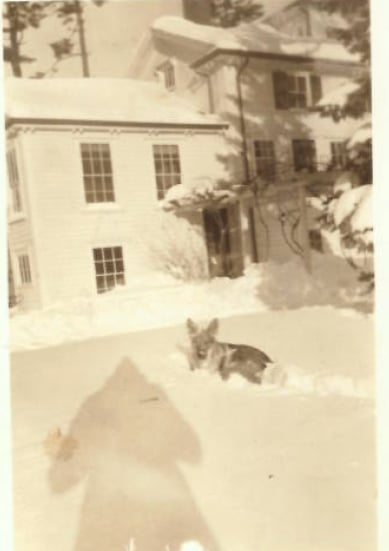
Northern exposure of the Joseph Andrews house showing the northern Ell that was lost in the move, taken from the rear side of the house.

== See also ==
- National Register of Historic Places listings in Waltham, Massachusetts
