= Carson-Andrews Mill and Ben F.W. Andrews House =

Historic house in North Carolina, United States

- U.S. National Register of Historic Places
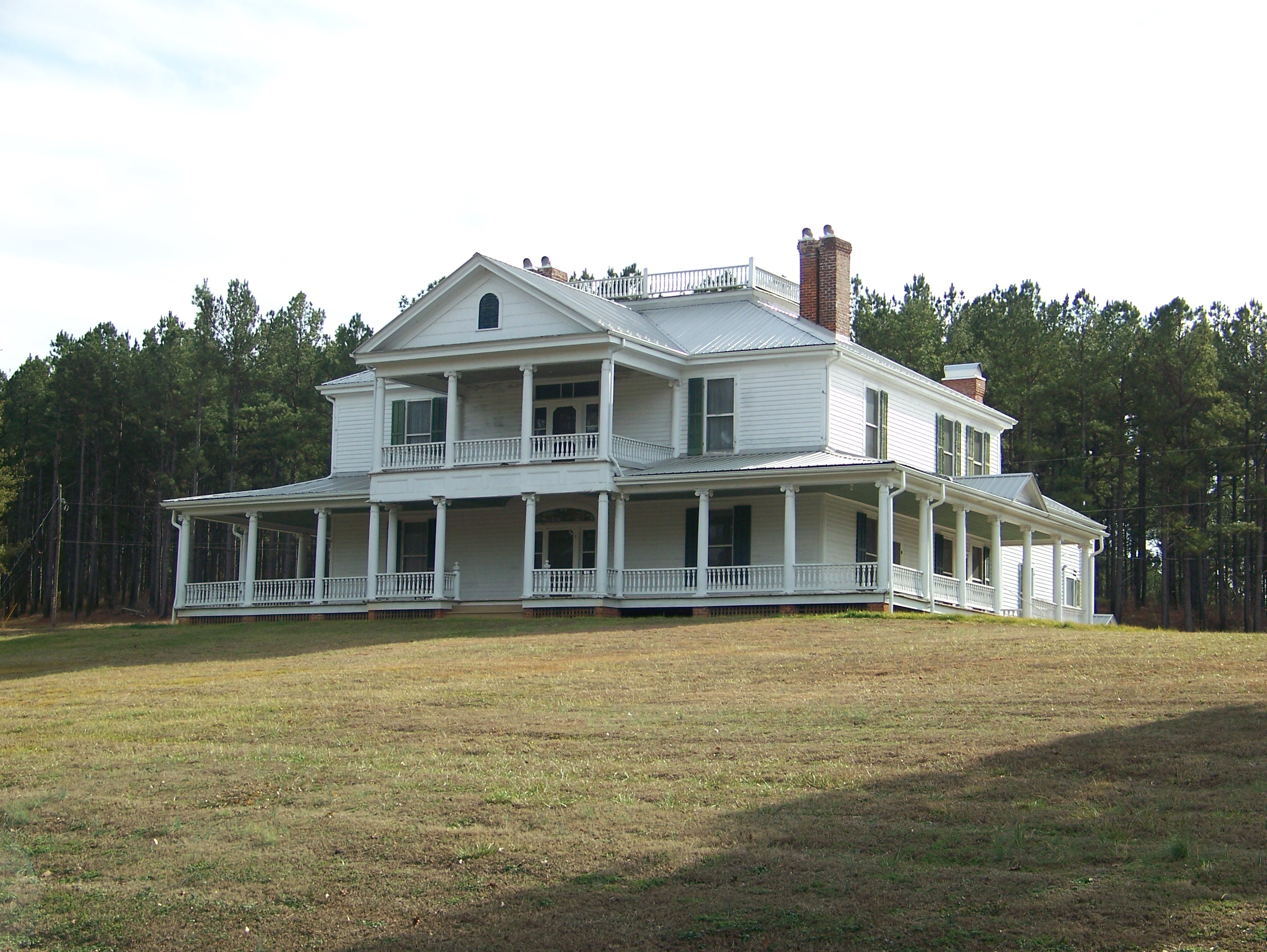
- Ben F.W. Andrews House, January 2013

- Location within North Carolina Location within the United States
- Location: Both sides of NC 1007, E., S., and W. of jct. with NC 1796, near Washburn, North Carolina
- Coordinates: 35°24′37″N 81°50′13″W
- Area: 0 acres (0 ha)
- Built: c. 1830-1835, c. 1904-1908
- Architectural style: Colonial Revival
- NRHP reference No.: 08000495
- Added to NRHP: June 4, 2008

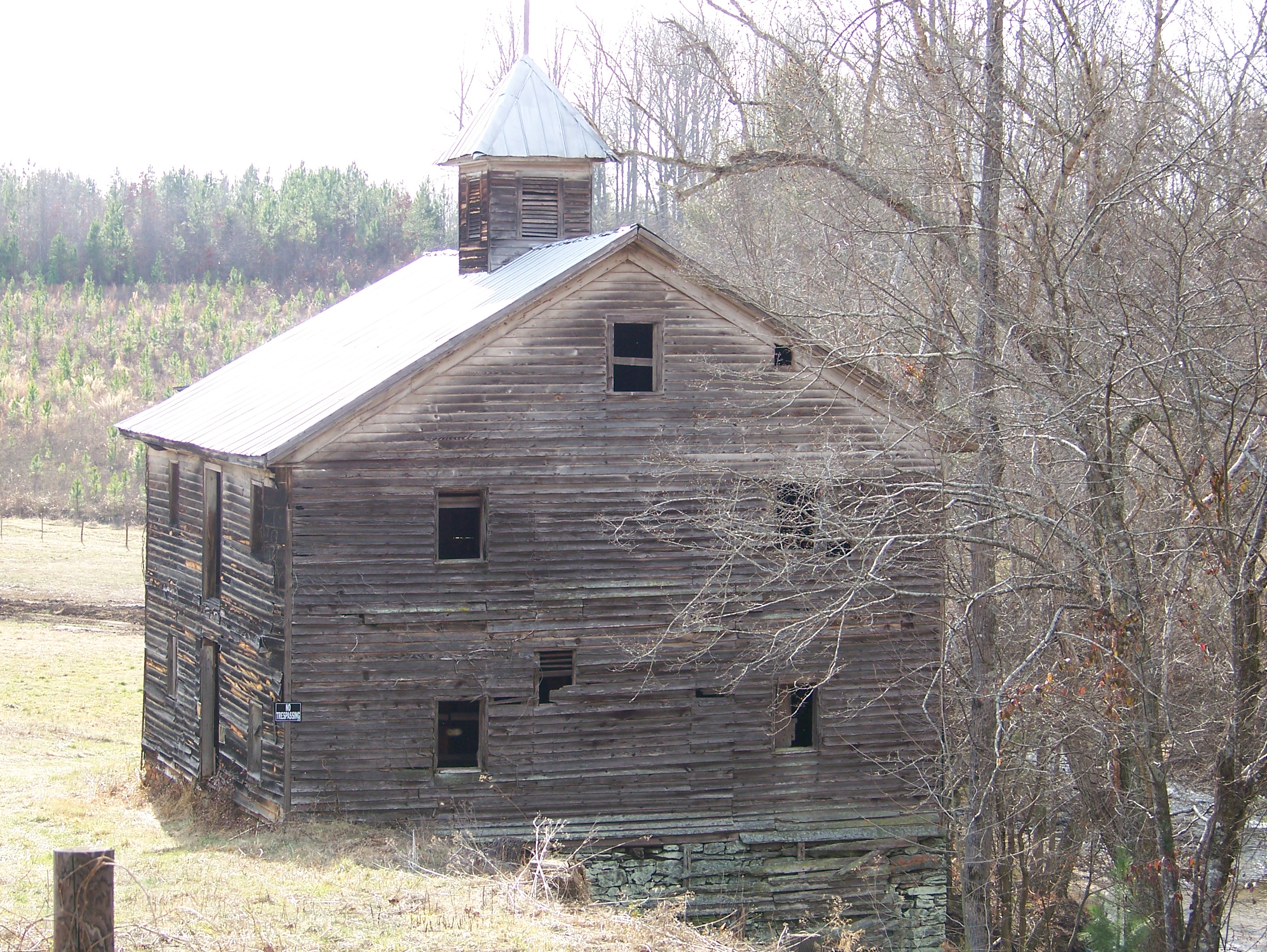
Carson-Andrews Mill, 2013

Carson-Andrews Mill and Ben F.W. Andrews House, also known as Andrews Mill, is a historic home and grist mill located near Washburn, Rutherford County, North Carolina.

== History ==
The Carson-Andrews Mill was built between about 1830 and 1835, and is a two-story-with-attic heavy timber frame grist mill.

Operation of the mill ceased in the early 1930s. The Ben F. W. Andrews House was built between about 1904 and 1908, and is a two-story, Colonial Revival style frame dwelling with a one-story rear ell. It features a pedimented, two-tier center-bay porch with one-story wraparound sections.

Other contributing resources are the landscaped grounds, water wheel and stone mount (1897), flower house (c. 1908–1910), and privy.

It was added to the National Register of Historic Places in 2008.
