= Andrews-Leggett House =

- U.S. National Register of Historic Places
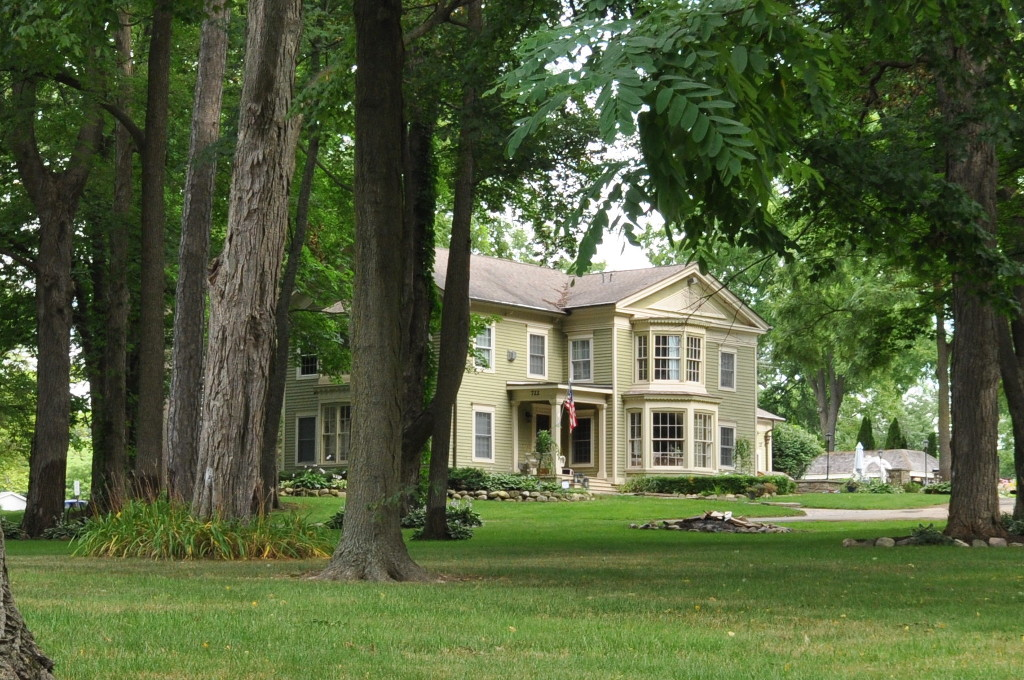
- Interactive map
- Location: 722 Farr St., Commerce Township, Michigan
- Coordinates: 42°35′39″N 83°29′25″W
- Area: 2.7 acres (1.1 ha)
- Built: 1837
- Architectural style: Greek Revival, Late Victorian
- NRHP reference No.: 87000949
- Added to NRHP: June 12, 1987

The Andrews-Leggett House is a single-family home located at 722 Farr Street in Commerce Township, Michigan. It was listed on the National Register of Historic Places in 1987. The house contains the only documented examples of 1830s-40s stenciled wall decorations in Michigan.

== History ==
In 1836/37, Amasa Andrews purchased land near the location, along with the rights to divert the Huron River to create a millrace and mill. In 1837, he purchased the farm where this house is now located, and likely constructed this house at the same time. In 1853, Andrews sold the farm to Augustus C. Baldwin, a lawyer from nearby Milford, who had just been elected county prosecutor. Baldwin had served in the state legislature before becoming prosecutor. Baldwin lived there only a short time, and in 1855 sold the house to Samuel M. Leggett, a gentleman farmer and poet.

In 1872, Leggett sold the farm to Martin S. Smith, a businessman from Detroit. Smith owned a jewelry store, and in 1874 became treasurer of Alger, Smith, and Company (whose president was Russell A. Alger), which soon became the largest pine lumbering company in the world. In 1876, Smith transferred ownership of the farm to Alden Hunnewell, one of the employees of Alger, Smith, and Company. The farm later passed to Alden Hunnewell's daughter, and her husband Thomas Field. The house remained in the Field family until 1986.

== Description ==
The Andrews-Leggett House consists of three sections. The original c. 1837 section is a two-story, side-gable, Greek Revival structure, measuring about 40 feet by 28 feet. It was originally a five-bay center entrance house. The second section is a 1-1/2-story ell, measuring 40 feet by 24 feet and extending to the rear of the original house. This ell is a very early addition, and may have been built in 1837 along with the main section of the house.

A later two-story Victorian addition, constructed in 1855 and measuring 20 feet by 26 feet, is centered on the front of the main section of the house, presenting a front gable to the street side of the house. This front-facing centered addition is unique among Michigan houses constructed at the time. The addition projects four feet from the front facade, and contains a semi-octagonal bay window on the first floor, topped by a small covered porch on the second floor. Porches flanking the addition are likely the remnants of a veranda that originally ran across the front of the 1837 house.

The entire house is constructed with a hewn timber frame and covered with clapboard. The entrance is through two doors on either side of the front addition, beneath the porches. The first floor contains a living room, dining room, parlor and kitchen, along with a stair hall with access to the second floor. The second floor contains several bedrooms opening from the stair hall, and a ballroom. The second-floor hallway and three of the bedrooms contain the remnants of early stenciled wall decorations.

== See also ==
- National Register of Historic Places listings in Oakland County, Michigan
