= McHugh–Andrews House =

Historic house in Colorado, United States

- U.S. National Register of Historic Places
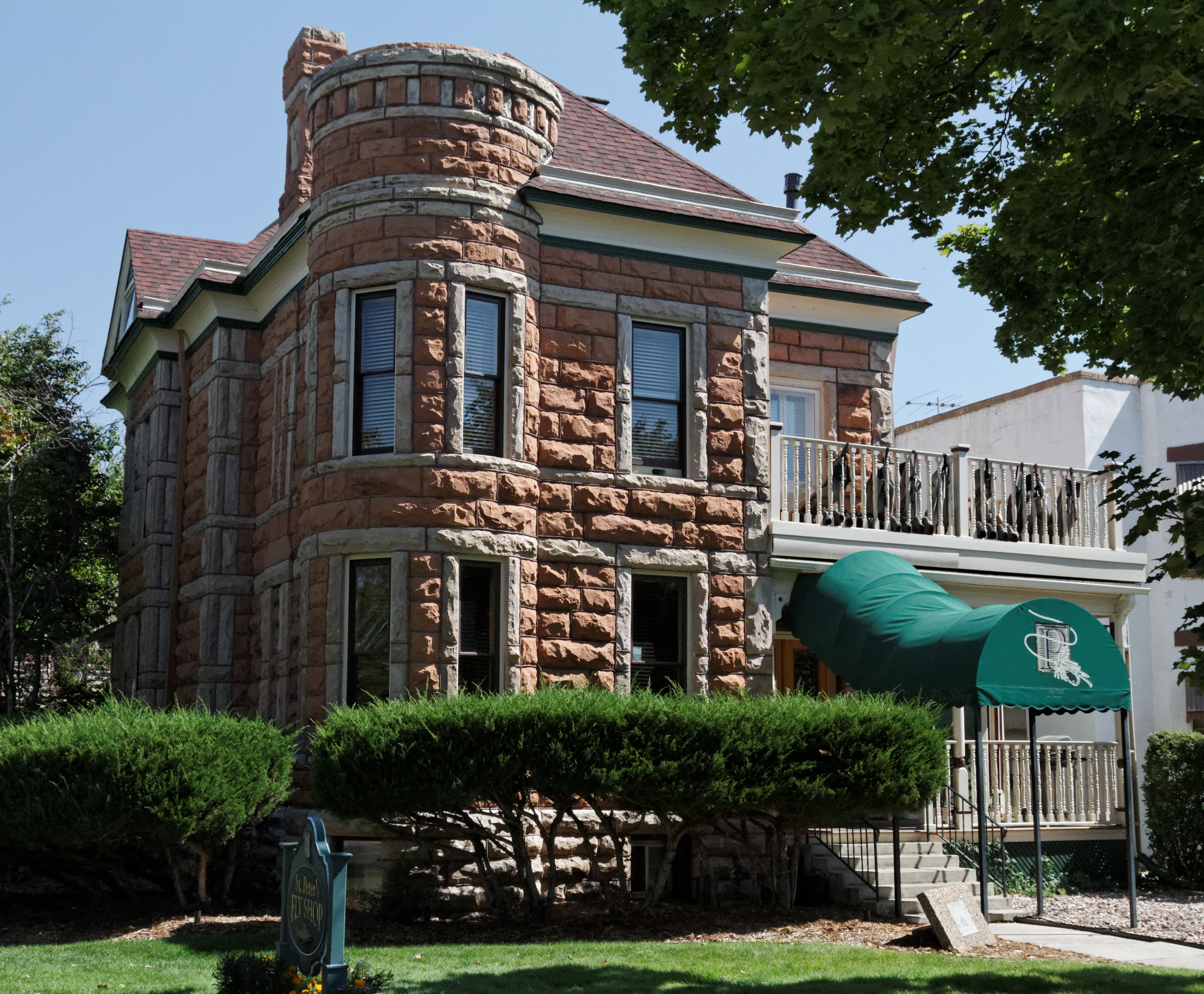

- Location within Colorado Location within the United States
- Location: 202 Remington St., Fort Collins, Colorado
- Coordinates: 40°35′8″N 105°4′29″W
- Area: less than one acre
- Built: 1885
- Built by: Kemoe, Lars P.
- Architect: Fuller, Montezuma
- Architectural style: Queen Anne, Romanesque
- NRHP reference No.: 78000870
- Added to NRHP: December 27, 1978

The McHugh–Andrews House at 202 Remington St. in Fort Collins, Colorado was built in 1885. It was designed by builder-architect Montezuma Fuller and it was also a work of Lars P. Kemoe. It was listed on the National Register of Historic Places in 1978.
