= Helen Wing House =

Historic house in New York, United States

- U.S. National Register of Historic Places
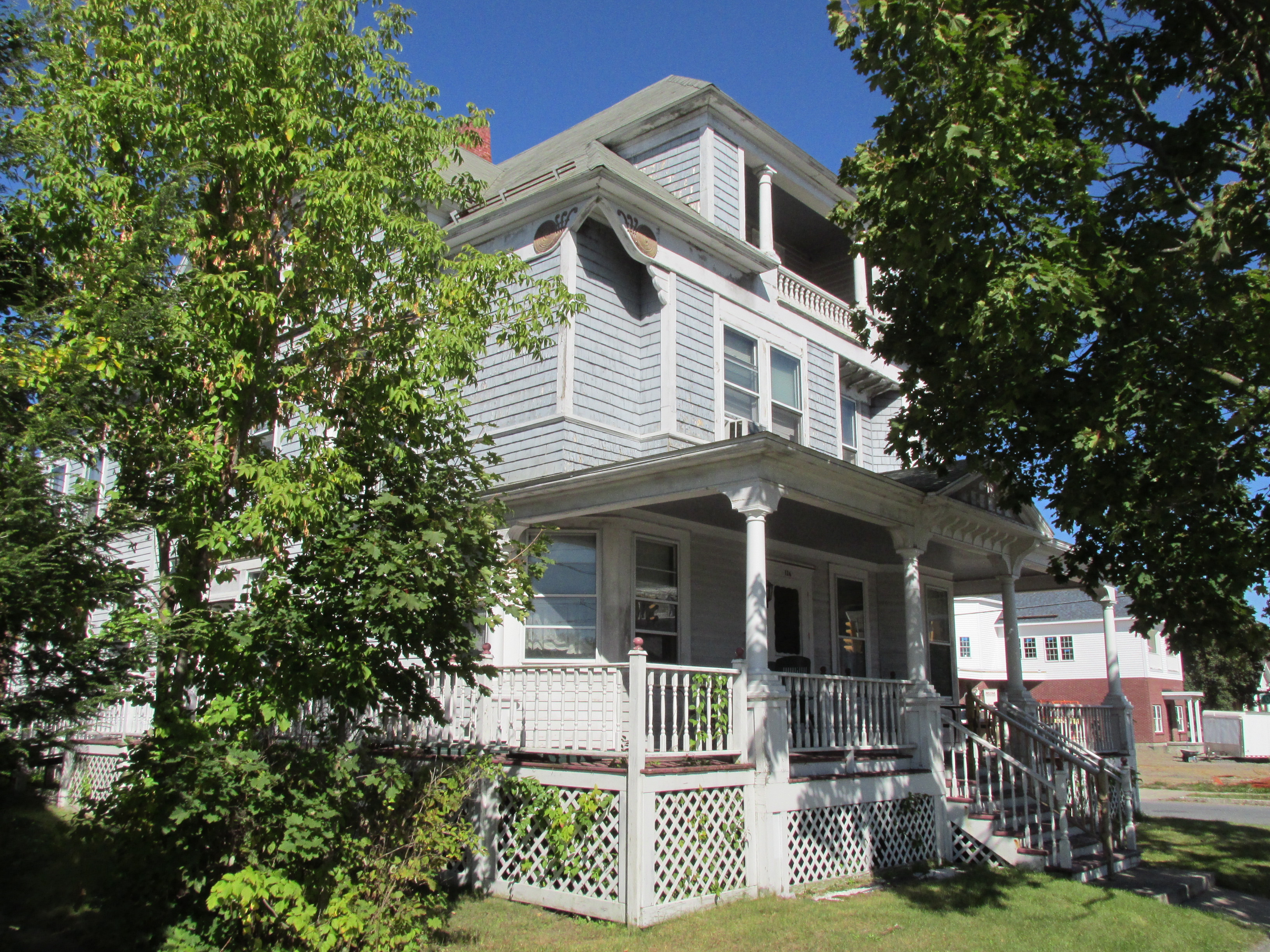
- Helen Wing House

- Location within New York Location within the United States
- Location: 126 Warren St., Glens Falls, New York
- Coordinates: 43°18′37″N 73°38′18″W
- Area: less than one acre
- Built: 1893
- Architect: Potter, Ephraim B.; Krum, Hiram
- Architectural style: Queen Anne
- MPS: Potter, Ephraim B., Buildings TR
- NRHP reference No.: 84003425
- Added to NRHP: September 29, 1984

The Helen Wing House is a historic home located in Glens Falls, Warren County, New York. It was built in 1893 and is a rectangular, 2 1/2-story, frame vernacular Queen Anne–style residence. It features a raised 1-story porch and open gallery at the attic level. The architect was Ephraim Potter.

It was added to the National Register of Historic Places in 1984.
