= Moses Andrews House =

Historic house in Connecticut, United States

- U.S. National Register of Historic Places
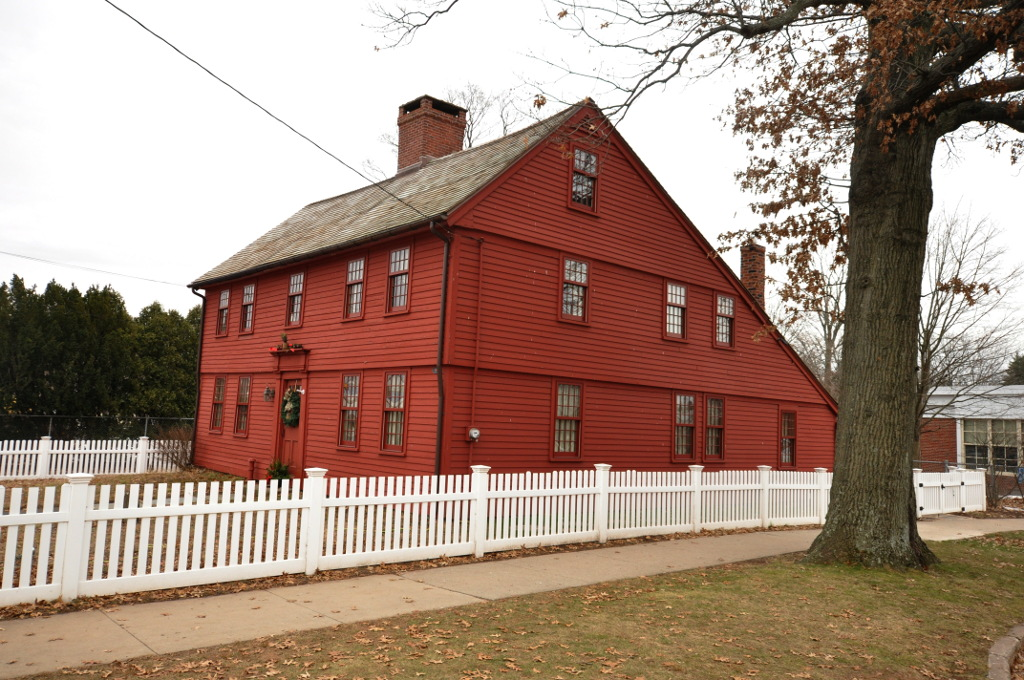

- Location within Connecticut Location within the United States
- Location: 424 West Main Street, Meriden, Connecticut
- Coordinates: 41°32′23″N 72°49′03″W
- Area: 0.3 acres (0.12 ha)
- Built: 1760
- Architectural style: Colonial
- NRHP reference No.: 78002859
- Added to NRHP: December 1, 1978

The Moses Andrews House is a historic house museum at 424 West Main Street in Meriden, Connecticut. Built about 1760, it is one of a small number of surviving 18th-century houses in the city. It has been operated by the local historical society as a museum property since about 1940. It was listed on the National Register of Historic Places in 1978.

== Description and history ==
The Moses Andrews House stands on the western fringe of downtown Meriden, on the south side of West Main Street. It is in a heavily developed area, surrounded by modern commercial development and a public school. It is a 2 1/2-story wood-frame structure, with a central chimney, gabled roof, and clapboarded exterior. Its rear roof line extends to the first floor, giving it a saltbox profile. At both the second floor at attic gable level there are slight overhangs. The main facade is five bays wide, with windows arranged symmetrically around a center entrance. The entrance is framed by a 19th-century surround, with pilasters and a simple dentillated projecting cornice above. The interior follows a typical central chimney plan, with a narrow entrance vestibule that also houses a winding staircase. Many of the interior finishes are original, including fireplace surrounds, flooring, and period door hardware.

The house was built about 1760 by Samuel Andrews, and was later inherited by his son Moses. Moses was a prominent figure in Meriden during the American Revolution: distrusted as a possible Loyalist due to his Anglican faith, he was forbidden to attend church in Wallingford, and ended up hosting Anglican (and later Episcopalian) services in his home. After his death, the house passed out of the family, and was purchased by the city in 1926, mainly for the surrounding land, on which the school was built. About 1940 a citizens' committee was formed to oversee its care, which eventually merged with the local historical society.

== See also ==
- National Register of Historic Places listings in New Haven County, Connecticut
