= H. C. Cohen Company Building–Andrews Building =

Historic commercial building in New York, United States

- H. C. Cohn Company Building–Andrews Building
- U.S. National Register of Historic Places
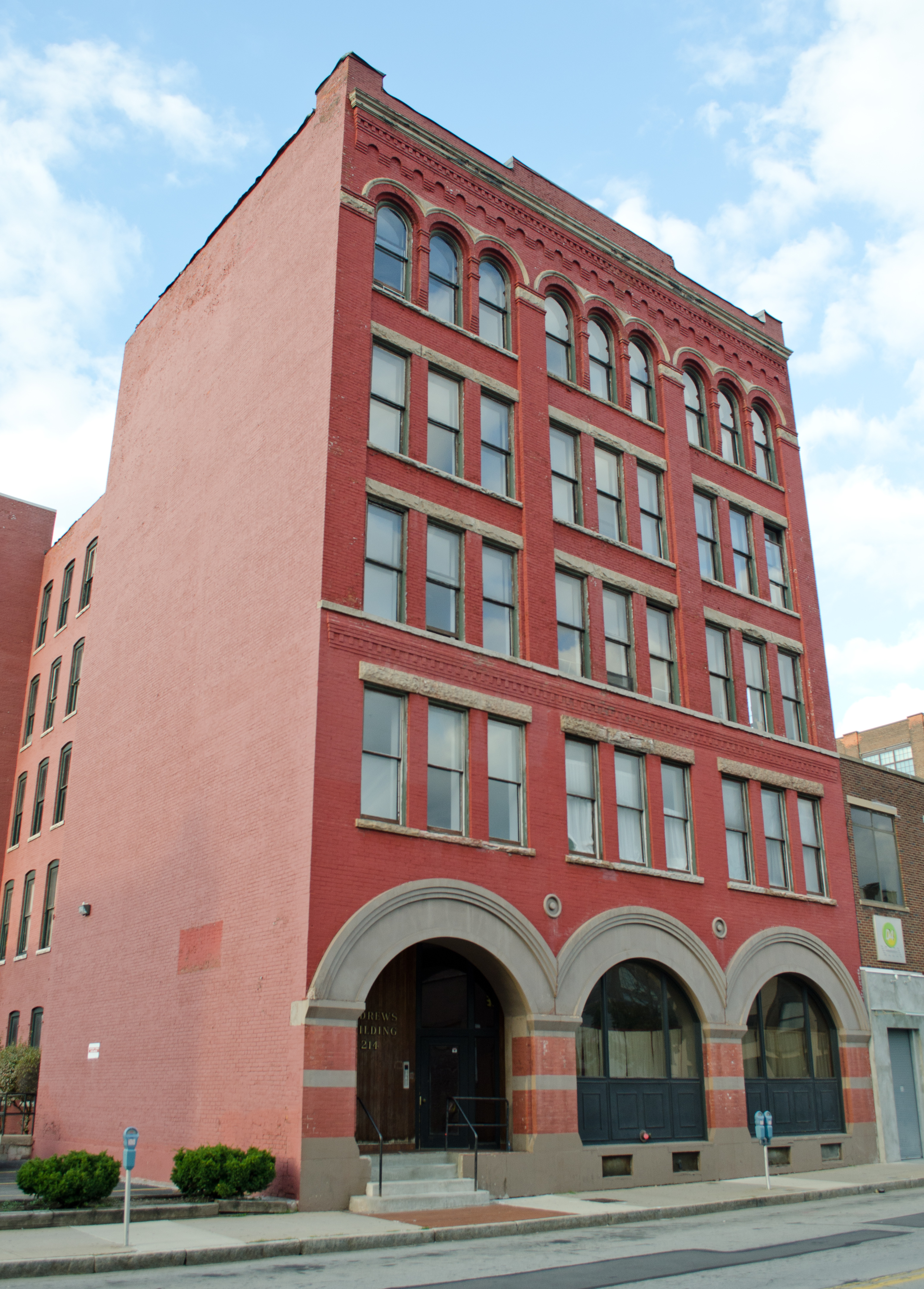
- H. C. Cohn Company Building–Andrews Building, October 2012

- Location within New York Location within the United States
- Location: 216 Andrews St., Rochester, New York
- Coordinates: 43°9′35″N 77°36′34″W
- Area: less than one acre
- Built: 1889
- Architectural style: Romanesque
- MPS: Inner Loop MRA
- NRHP reference No.: 85002853
- Added to NRHP: October 04, 1985

H. C. Cohn Company Building–Andrews Building is a historic industrial and commercial building located at Rochester in Monroe County, New York. It is a five-story masonry structure built in 1889 for the H. C. Cohn Company, a manufacturer of men's neckwear and silk ties. It housed the successor of H.C. Cohn Company, Superba Cravats, until 1983. The Andrews Street facade is detailed with Medina sandstone and corbelled brick in Romanesque Revival style. A two-story brick masonry addition was completed about 1955.

It was listed on the National Register of Historic Places in 1985.

== See also ==
- National Register of Historic Places listings in Rochester, New York
