= Col. Ralph Andrews House =

Historic house in Arkansas, United States

- U.S. National Register of Historic Places
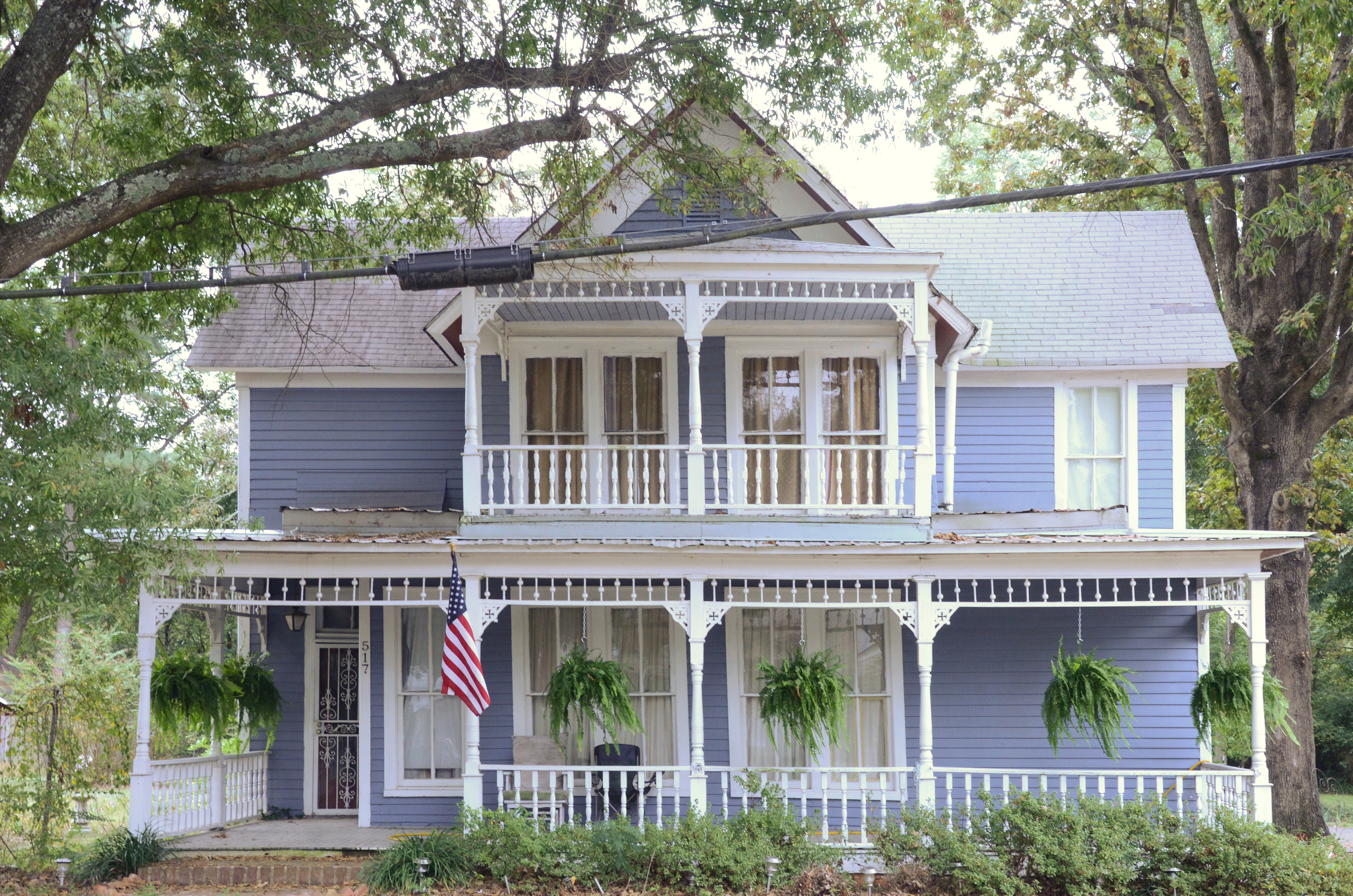

- Location within Arkansas Location within the United States
- Location: 517 W. Center St., Beebe, Arkansas
- Coordinates: 35°4′5″N 91°53′9″W
- Area: less than one acre
- Built: 1885
- Built by: C.E. Price
- Architectural style: Vernacular cross-shaped, Other
- MPS: White County MPS
- NRHP reference No.: 91001253
- Added to NRHP: September 5, 1991

The Col. Ralph Andrews House is a historic house at 517 W. Center St. in Beebe, Arkansas. Built c. 1885, it is one of a small number of houses in Beebe to survive from the early period of the city's growth. It is a 2 1/2-story wood-frame structure, with clapboard siding, and a Folk Victorian porch with turned posts and jigsawn brackets. The building's cruciform plan is fairly typical of houses built in White County during the period; this is one of the best-preserved of those that remain.

The house was listed on the National Register of Historic Places in 1991.

== See also ==
- National Register of Historic Places listings in White County, Arkansas
