= Andrews-Wing House =

Historic house in Missouri, United States

- U.S. National Register of Historic Places
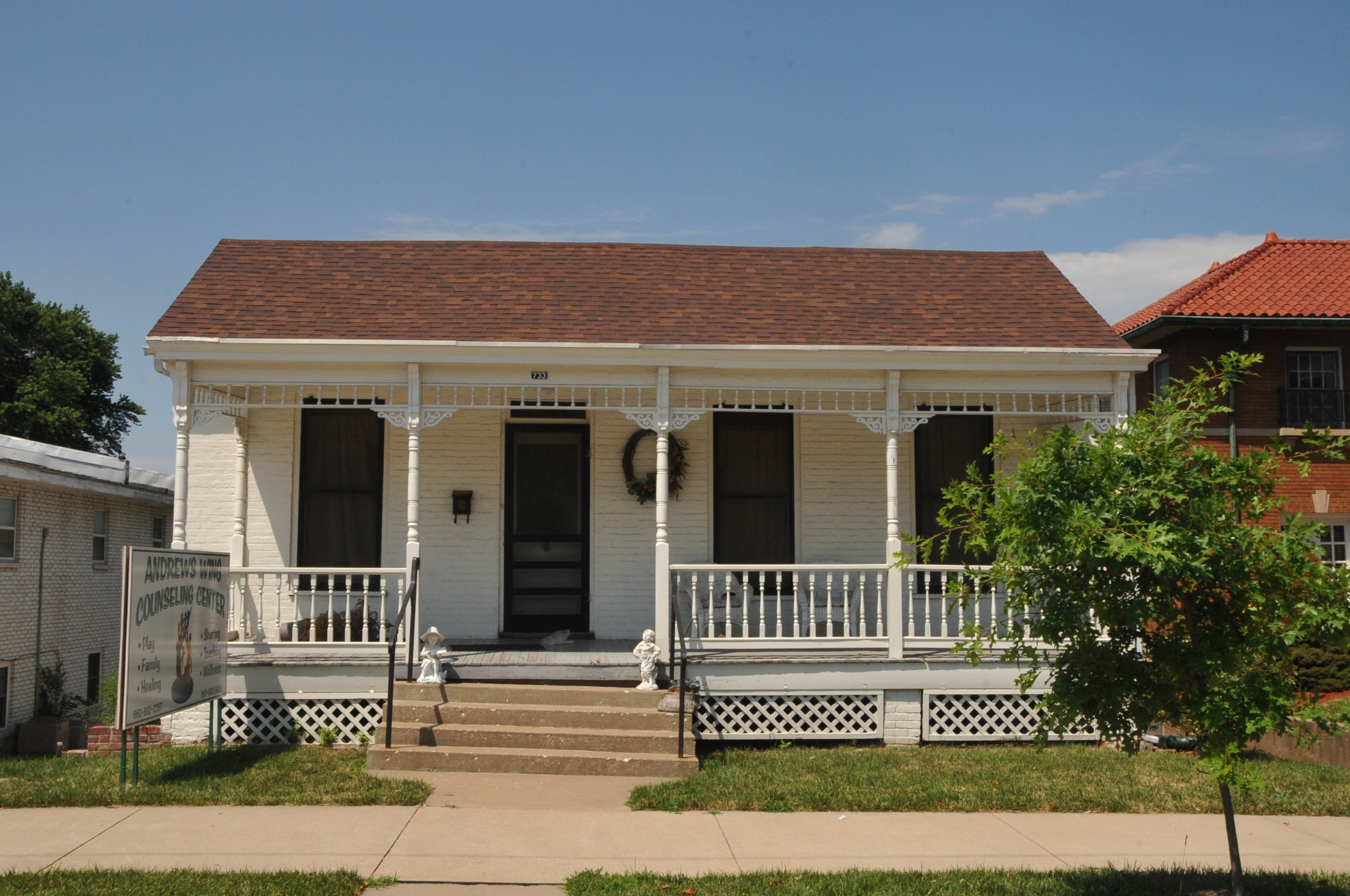

- Location within Missouri Location within the United States
- Location: 733 Main Street, Boonville, Missouri
- Coordinates: 38°58′17″N 92°44′33″W
- Area: less than one acre
- Built: c. 1855
- Architectural style: Vernacular brick
- MPS: Boonville Missouri MRA
- NRHP reference No.: 82005304
- Added to NRHP: March 16, 1990

The Andrews-Wing House is a historic house located in Boonville, Cooper County, Missouri.

== History ==
It was built around 1855 for David Andrews, and is a one-story, vernacular brick dwelling with a variation of a hall and parlor plan. It has a brick ell and two-story frame addition. Also on the property is a contributing rusticated stone garage (c. 1920).

It was listed on the National Register of Historic Places on March 16, 1990.
