= National Register of Historic Places listings in Warren County, New York =

Location of Warren County in New York

List of Registered Historic Places in Warren County, New York

This is intended to be a complete list of properties and districts listed on the National Register of Historic Places in Warren County, New York. The locations of National Register properties and districts (at least for all showing latitude and longitude coordinates below) may be seen in a map by clicking on "Map of all coordinates". Three of the properties, Adirondack Forest Preserve, the Land Tortoise and Owl's Nest, are further designated U.S. National Historic Landmarks.

This National Park Service list is complete through NPS recent listings posted July 31, 2026.

Contents: Counties in New York
Albany (Albany) – Allegany – Bronx – Broome – Cattaraugus – Cayuga – Chautauqua – Chemung – Chenango – Clinton – Columbia – Cortland – Delaware – Dutchess (Poughkeepsie, Rhinebeck) – Erie (Buffalo) – Essex – Franklin – Fulton – Genesee – Greene – Hamilton – Herkimer – Jefferson – Kings – Lewis – Livingston – Madison – Monroe (Rochester) – Montgomery – Nassau – New York (Below 14th Street, 14th to 59th Streets, 59th to 110th Streets, Above 110th Street, Islands) – Niagara (Niagara Falls) – Oneida – Onondaga (Syracuse) – Ontario – Orange – Orleans – Oswego – Otsego – Putnam – Queens – Rensselaer – Richmond – Rockland – St. Lawrence – Saratoga – Schenectady – Schoharie – Schuyler – Seneca – Steuben – Suffolk – Sullivan – Tioga – Tompkins – Ulster – Warren – Washington – Wayne – Westchester (Northern, Southern, New Rochelle, Peekskill, Yonkers) – Wyoming – Yates

== Listings county-wide ==
	Name on the Register	Image	Date listed	Location	City or town	Description
1	18th Separate Company Armory	18th Separate Company Armory	September 29, 1984 (#84003269)	147 Warren St. 43°18′36″N 73°37′26″W	Glens Falls	
2	Adirondack Forest Preserve	Adirondack Forest Preserve	October 15, 1966 (#66000891)	Northeastern New York; 43°58′43″N 74°18′42″W	Numerous counties	
3	Argent Apartments	Argent Apartments	September 29, 1984 (#84003240)	17-18 Sherman Ave. 43°18′40″N 73°38′23″W	Glens Falls	
4	Bemis Eye Sanitarium Complex	Bemis Eye Sanitarium Complex	September 29, 1984 (#84003243)	Glen St. 43°18′43″N 73°39′01″W	Glens Falls	
5	Stephen T. Birdsall House	Stephen T. Birdsall House	September 29, 1984 (#84003245)	186-192 Ridge St. 43°19′02″N 73°37′54″W	Glens Falls	
6	Thomas Burnham House	Thomas Burnham House	September 29, 1984 (#84003248)	195 Ridge St. 43°19′05″N 73°38′37″W	Glens Falls	
7	CADET (Shipwreck)		May 22, 2002 (#02000553)	Address Restricted	Bolton	
8	Caldwell Presbyterian Church	Caldwell Presbyterian Church	April 12, 2016 (#16000164)	71 Montcalm St. 43°25′30″N 73°42′54″W	Lake George	Mid-19th century church building is intact example of contemporary Protestant architecture
9	Chestertown Historic District	Chestertown Historic District	August 22, 1977 (#77000984)	Canada Dr. (U.S. Route 9); also NY-9/Main St, Riverside Dr, Mill St, LaFlure Ln, Pine St, Theriot Av. 43°39′07″N 73°48′05″W	Chestertown	Second set of addresses represent a boundary increase approved December 4, 2025
10	Church of Saint Sacrement	Church of Saint Sacrement	May 26, 2026 (#100013036)	5 Sacrement Lane; 43°33′12″N 73°39′25″W	Bolton Landing	
11	Addison B. Colvin House	Addison B. Colvin House	September 29, 1984 (#84003251)	453-455 Glen St. 43°18′53″N 73°38′24″W	Glens Falls	
12	W. T. Cowles House	W. T. Cowles House	September 29, 1984 (#84003255)	43-47 William St. 43°19′03″N 73°38′41″W	Glens Falls	
13	Cunningham House	Cunningham House	September 29, 1984 (#84003258)	169 Warren St. 43°18′38″N 73°38′01″W	Glens Falls	
14	Delaware and Hudson Passenger Station	Delaware and Hudson Passenger Station	May 22, 2013 (#13000310)	57 Beach Rd. 43°25′15″N 73°42′41″W	Lake George	
15	Zopher Delong House	Zopher Delong House	September 29, 1984 (#84003261)	348 Glen St. 43°18′40″N 73°38′12″W	Glens Falls	
16	James L. Dix House	James L. Dix House	September 29, 1984 (#84003268)	191 Ridge St. 43°19′03″N 73°37′52″W	Glens Falls	
17	Dr. James Ferguson Office	Dr. James Ferguson Office	September 29, 1984 (#84003282)	5 Culvert St. 43°18′37″N 73°37′36″W	Glens Falls	
18	First Presbyterian Church	First Presbyterian Church	September 29, 1984 (#84003314)	402-410 Glen St. 43°18′44″N 73°38′21″W	Glens Falls	
19	Forward shipwreck site (motor launch)		November 21, 2008 (#08001082)	Lake George (submerged) near Diamond Island; 43°27′10″N 73°40′49″W	Lake George	
20	Dr. Charles A. Foster House	Dr. Charles A. Foster House	September 29, 1984 (#84003321)	162-164 Warren St. 43°18′38″N 73°37′21″W	Glens Falls	
21	Fredella Avenue Historic District	Fredella Avenue Historic District	September 29, 1984 (#84003328)	15-21R Fredella Ave. 43°18′32″N 73°38′23″W	Glens Falls	
22	Joseph J. Fredella House and Garage		September 29, 1984 (#84003331)	15-17 Mohican St. 43°18′24″N 73°38′37″W	Glens Falls	Demolished prior to August 2016 for hospital parking lot
23	Gates Homestead	Gates Homestead	April 27, 2010 (#10000229)	4617 Lakeshore Dr. (NY 9N); 43°32′16″N 73°40′04″W	Bolton	
24	Glens Falls Cemetery	Glens Falls Cemetery	July 28, 2004 (#04000756)	38 Ogden St. 43°19′16″N 73°39′13″W	Glens Falls	
25	Glens Falls Feeder Canal	Glens Falls Feeder Canal	October 25, 1985 (#85003401)	Roughly between Richardson St. and the Old Champlain Canal; 43°18′07″N 73°37′53″W	Glens Falls	
26	Glens Falls High School	Glens Falls High School	September 29, 1984 (#84003335)	421-433 Glen St. 43°18′50″N 73°39′05″W	Glens Falls	
27	Glens Falls Home for Aged Women	Glens Falls Home for Aged Women	September 29, 1984 (#84003340)	178-186 Warren St. 43°18′51″N 73°37′15″W	Glens Falls	
28	Stephen L. Goodman House		September 29, 1984 (#84003345)	65-67 Park St. 43°18′27″N 73°38′01″W	Glens Falls	Demolished in 1999
29	Hague Baptist Church	Hague Baptist Church	October 29, 2020 (#100005709)	9830 NY 8 (Graphite Mountain Road); 43°44′48″N 73°30′01″W	Hague	
30	Hamlet of Warrensburgh Historic District	Hamlet of Warrensburgh Historic District	May 14, 2001 (#01000292)	Roughly along Schroon River and the Camp Echo Lake; 43°29′37″N 73°47′06″W	Warrensburgh	
31	Heintzelman Library	Heintzelman Library	June 26, 2017 (#100001249)	6615 NY 8; 43°40′37″N 73°44′58″W	Brant Lake	Rustic stone and wood library was built in 1907 with bequest from local Union Army widow and has become one of Brant Lake's best-known landmarks; after new library was opened in 2001 has served as local history museum
32	Hoopes House	Hoopes House	September 29, 1984 (#84003348)	153 Warren St. 43°18′37″N 73°38′07″W	Glens Falls	
33	House at 216 Warren Street		September 29, 1984 (#84003351)	216 Warren St. 43°18′38″N 73°37′04″W	Glens Falls	Demolished sometime between June 2012 and October 2014 (based on Google Street Views)
34	Hyde House	Hyde House	September 29, 1984 (#84003358)	161 Warren St. 43°18′37″N 73°38′04″W	Glens Falls	
35	Joubert and White Building	Joubert and White Building	September 29, 1984 (#84003360)	79 Warren St. 43°18′33″N 73°37′42″W	Glens Falls	
36	Hiram Krum House	Hiram Krum House	September 29, 1984 (#84003363)	133 Warren St. 43°18′36″N 73°37′30″W	Glens Falls	
37	Lake George Battlefield Park Historic District	Lake George Battlefield Park Historic District	December 30, 2011 (#11000971)	139 Beach Rd. 43°25′22″N 73°42′50″W	Lake George vicinity	
38	The Lake George Club		August 6, 2026 (#100013266)	4000 Lake Shore Drive; 43°29′54″N 73°40′38″W	Diamond Point	
39	Land Tortoise (radeau) Shipwreck Site		July 10, 1995 (#95000819)	Sunk in Lake George; 43°26′25″N 73°41′34″W	Lake George	
40	Liddle Warehouse	Liddle Warehouse	June 1, 2026 (#100013065)	178 Maple Street; 43°18′43″N 73°38′13″W	Glens Falls	
41	Russell M. Little House	Russell M. Little House	September 29, 1984 (#84003367)	17 Center St. 43°18′39″N 73°37′44″W	Glens Falls	
42	Merrill MaGee House	Merrill MaGee House	April 11, 1985 (#85000728)	2 Hudson St. 43°29′47″N 73°46′36″W	Warrensburg	
43	Marcella Sembrich Opera Museum	Marcella Sembrich Opera Museum	July 19, 2002 (#02000799)	4800 Lake Shore Dr. 43°32′52″N 73°39′40″W	Bolton Landing	
44	William McEchron House	William McEchron House	September 29, 1984 (#84003371)	65 Ridge St. 43°18′39″N 73°37′53″W	Glens Falls	
45	Methodist Episcopal Church	Methodist Episcopal Church	February 17, 2010 (#10000031)	33 Harrisburg Road; 43°25′32″N 73°55′47″W	Stony Creek	
46	Mixter Blacksmith Shop	Mixter Blacksmith Shop	September 12, 2002 (#02001051)	27 Main St. 43°29′27″N 73°46′01″W	Warrensburg	
47	Mohican Point	Mohican Point	March 6, 2026 (#100012102)	4860 Lake Shore Drive (9N); 43°33′04″N 73°39′25″W	Bolton Landing	
48	Mountainside Free Library	Mountainside Free Library	November 8, 2021 (#100007099)	3090 NY 9L; 43°26′42″N 73°39′22″W	Queensbury	
49	North Creek Railroad Station Complex	North Creek Railroad Station Complex	August 27, 1976 (#76001287)	Railroad Pl. 43°42′10″N 73°59′23″W	North Creek	
50	Old Warren County Courthouse Complex	Old Warren County Courthouse Complex	June 19, 1973 (#73001282)	Canada and Amherst Sts. 43°25′32″N 73°42′43″W	Lake George	Built in five stages over 19th century, served as county government building until 1963
51	Jones Ordway House	Jones Ordway House	September 29, 1984 (#84003376)	142 Warren St. 43°18′38″N 73°37′28″W	Glens Falls	
52	Owl's Nest	Owl's Nest	November 11, 1971 (#71000565)	NY 9L; 43°26′37″N 73°39′19″W	Lake George	Summer estate and later full-time home of Edward Eggleston, early American Realist writer
53	George H. Parks House	George H. Parks House	September 29, 1984 (#84003378)	444 Glen St. 43°18′50″N 73°38′25″W	Glens Falls	
54	John E. Parry House	John E. Parry House	September 29, 1984 (#84003382)	146 Warren St. 43°18′38″N 73°38′10″W	Glens Falls	
55	Royal C. Peabody Estate		June 21, 1984 (#84003386)	Lake Shore Dr. 43°27′03″N 73°41′40″W	Lake George	
56	Peyser and Morrison Shirt Company Building	Peyser and Morrison Shirt Company Building	September 29, 1984 (#84003388)	211-217 Warren St. 43°18′36″N 73°37′50″W	Glens Falls	
57	Ephraim B. Potter House	Ephraim B. Potter House	September 29, 1984 (#84003391)	15 Sherman Ave. 43°18′41″N 73°39′06″W	Glens Falls	
58	Queensbury Hotel	Queensbury Hotel	September 14, 2018 (#100002924)	88 Ridge St. 43°18′43″N 73°38′39″W	Glens Falls	1925-26 hotel built by local business community
59	Queensbury Quaker Burying Ground	Queensbury Quaker Burying Ground	February 23, 2015 (#15000035)	Bay & Quaker Rds. 43°19′55″N 73°39′12″W	Queensbury	Burial site for members of Queensbury Friends Meeting from mid-18th to mid-19th centuries
60	Riverside Train Station	Riverside Train Station	June 5, 1997 (#97000471)	Junction of the Hudson River and NY 8; 43°39′40″N 73°53′58″W	Riparius	
61	Enoch Rosekrans House	Enoch Rosekrans House	September 29, 1984 (#84003396)	62 Warren St. 43°18′35″N 73°37′47″W	Glens Falls	
62	A. S. Rugge House	A. S. Rugge House	September 29, 1984 (#84003394)	428 Glen St. 43°18′44″N 73°38′23″W	Glens Falls	
63	Sagamore Hotel Complex	Sagamore Hotel Complex	July 21, 1983 (#83001824)	Green Island and Federal Hill; 43°34′29″N 73°39′30″W	Bolton Landing	
64	St. James Episcopal Church	St. James Episcopal Church	December 11, 2013 (#13000915)	172 Ottawa Street; 43°25′31″N 73°42′59″W	Lake George	1866 Gothic Revival church may reflect some design work by Richard Upjohn
65	Sanford House	Sanford House	May 29, 1998 (#98000549)	749 Ridge Rd. 43°21′06″N 73°37′15″W	Queensbury	
66	Sherman House	Sherman House	November 7, 1977 (#77000985)	380 Glen St. 43°18′44″N 73°39′04″W	Glens Falls	
67	Silver Bay Association Complex	Silver Bay Association Complex	March 20, 1980 (#80002785)	NY 9N; 43°41′38″N 73°30′21″W	Silver Bay	
68	Smith Flats	Smith Flats	September 29, 1984 (#84003404)	53-61 Bay St. 43°18′45″N 73°38′49″W	Glens Falls	
69	Society of Friends Hall	Society of Friends Hall	September 29, 1984 (#84003407)	172-174 Ridge St. 43°18′58″N 73°37′55″W	Glens Falls	
70	St. Mary's Academy	St. Mary's Academy	September 29, 1984 (#84003400)	10-12 Church St. 43°18′35″N 73°37′49″W	Glens Falls	
71	Thomas Stilwell House	Thomas Stilwell House	September 29, 1984 (#84003414)	134 Maple St. 43°18′41″N 73°38′28″W	Glens Falls	
72	Asa Stower House	Asa Stower House	April 12, 2006 (#06000261)	693 Ridge Rd. 43°20′52″N 73°37′13″W	Queensbury	
73	Three Squares Historic District	Three Squares Historic District	September 29, 1984 (#84003420)	Roughly South, Glen, Maple, and Ridge Sts.; also roughly bounded by Broad, Maple, Pine, and Glen (US 9) Sts. 43°18′32″N 73°38′00″W	Glens Falls	Second set of addresses represent a boundary change approved November 15, 2022.
74	US Post Office-Lake George	US Post Office-Lake George	May 11, 1989 (#88002338)	180 Canada St. 43°25′25″N 73°42′49″W	Lake George	1940 post office has modernist touches on restrained Colonial Revival design
75	F. W. Wait House	F. W. Wait House	September 29, 1984 (#84003422)	173-175 Ridge St. 43°18′59″N 73°37′52″W	Glens Falls	
76	Warrensburg Mills Historic District	Warrensburg Mills Historic District	September 18, 1975 (#75001232)	Roughly bounded by the Osborne and Woolen Mill bridges, Schroon River and the railroad right of way 43°29′21″N 73°46′31″W	Warrensburg	
77	Wiawaka Bateaux Site	Wiawaka Bateaux Site	June 14, 1992 (#92000624)	Address Restricted	Lake George	
78	Wiawaka Holiday House	Wiawaka Holiday House	July 15, 1998 (#98000874)	NY 9L southeast of Lake George; 43°25′26″N 73°41′28″W	Lake George	Early 20th-century affordable resort for women
79	Martin L. C. Wilmarth House	Martin L. C. Wilmarth House	September 29, 1984 (#84003423)	528 Glen St. 43°19′05″N 73°39′26″W	Glens Falls	
80	Helen Wing House	Helen Wing House	September 29, 1984 (#84003425)	126 Warren St. 43°18′37″N 73°38′18″W	Glens Falls	
81	Woodward Hall		May 12, 2014 (#14000206)	1312 Lake Ave. 43°22′07″N 73°47′34″W	Lake Luzerne	

== See also ==
- National Register of Historic Places listings in New York
