= Sherman House (Glens Falls, New York) =

Historic house in New York, United States

- U.S. National Register of Historic Places
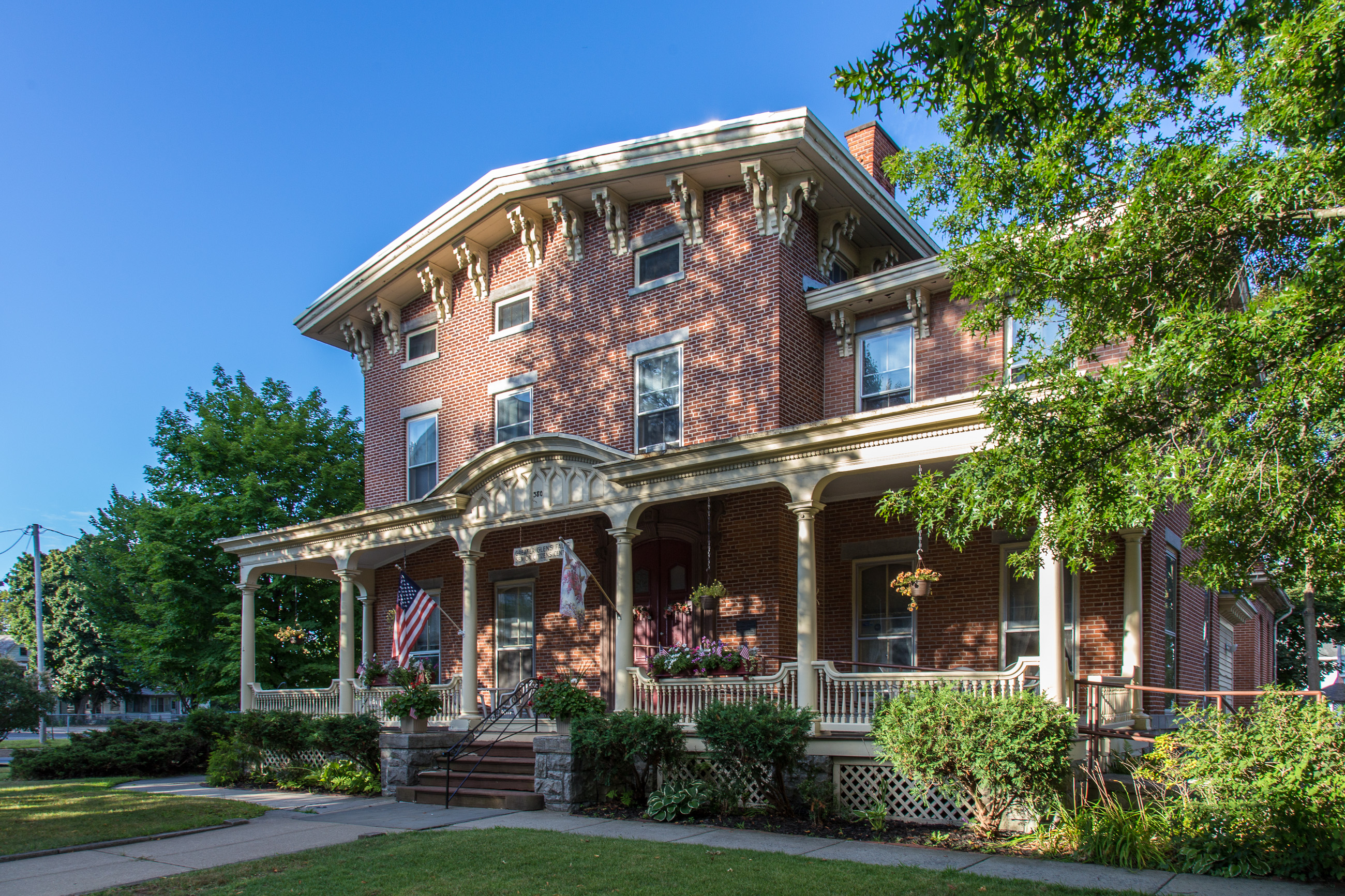
- Sherman House

- Location within New York Location within the United States
- Location: 380 Glen St., Glens Falls, New York
- Coordinates: 43°18′44″N 73°39′4″W
- Area: less than one acre
- Architectural style: Mixed (more Than 2 Styles From Different Periods)
- NRHP reference No.: 77000985
- Added to NRHP: November 7, 1977

Sherman House is a historic home located at Glens Falls, Warren County, New York. It is a large pink brick building with a profusely bracketed roof and octagonal cupola. It consists of a 2 1/2-story rectangular block to which has been added four porches and three wings. It is thought to date to the 1840s. The front verandah and rear wing date to about 1900 when it was occupied by the Bemis Eye Sanitarium.

It was added to the National Register of Historic Places in 1977.

== See also ==
- National Register of Historic Places listings in Warren County, New York
