= Hiram Krum House =

Historic house in New York, United States

- U.S. National Register of Historic Places
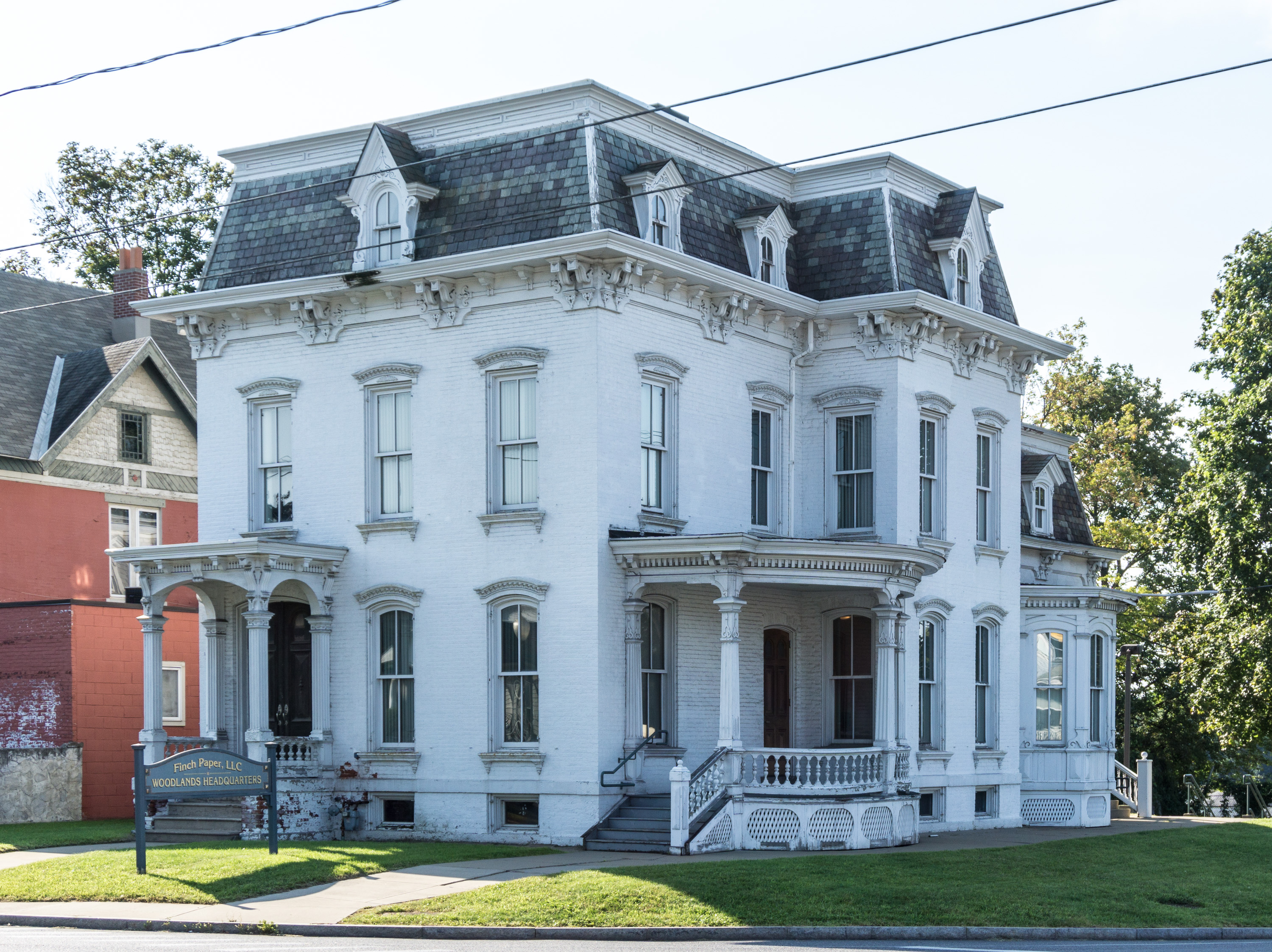

- Location within New York Location within the United States
- Location: 133 Warren St., Glens Falls, New York
- Coordinates: 43°18′36″N 73°37′30″W
- Area: less than one acre
- Built: 1865
- Architect: Krum, Hiram
- Architectural style: Second Empire, Italianate
- MPS: Glens Falls MRA
- NRHP reference No.: 84003363
- Added to NRHP: September 29, 1984

Hiram Krum House is a historic home located at Glens Falls, Warren County, New York. It was built about 1865 and is a 2 1/2-story, three- by five-bay, irregularly shaped brick residence in a transitional Italianate / Second Empire style. It features a mansard roof.

In 2016, a sign outside the building reads: "Finch Paper, LLC: Woodlands Headquarters."

It was added to the National Register of Historic Places in 1984.

== See also ==
- National Register of Historic Places listings in Warren County, New York
