= Russell M. Little House =

Historic house in New York, United States

- U.S. National Register of Historic Places
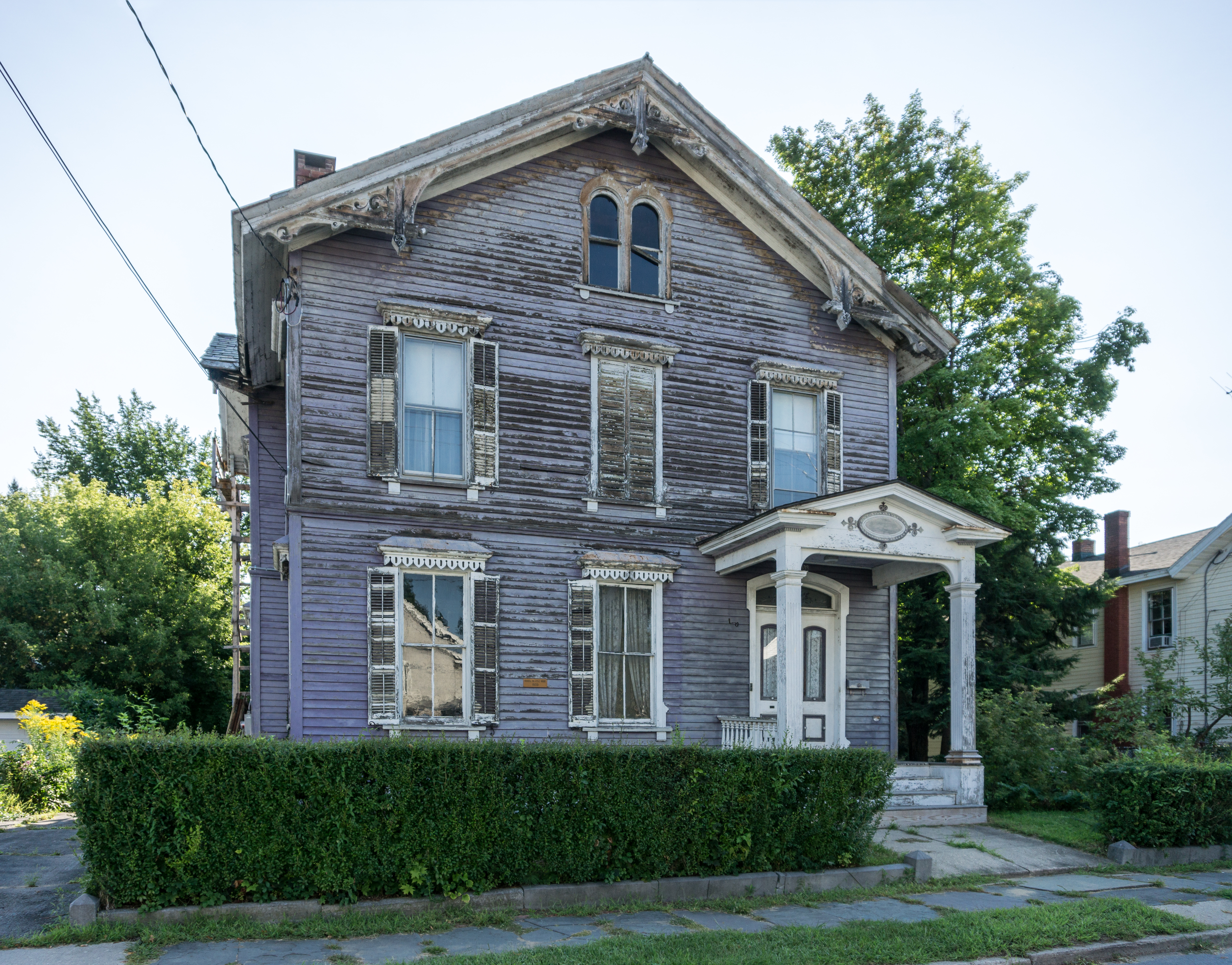

- Location within New York Location within the United States
- Location: 17 Center St., Glens Falls, New York
- Coordinates: 43°18′39″N 73°37′44″W
- Area: less than one acre
- Built: 1876
- Architectural style: Late Gothic Revival, Carpenter Gothic
- MPS: Glens Falls MRA
- NRHP reference No.: 84003367
- Added to NRHP: September 29, 1984

Russell M. Little House is a historic home located at Glens Falls, Warren County, New York. It was built about 1876 and is a three bay, two story frame residence sheathed in clapboards. It has an eclectic design with elements of Italianate and Carpenter Gothic design.

It was added to the National Register of Historic Places in 1984.

== See also ==
- National Register of Historic Places listings in Warren County, New York
