= F. W. Wait House =

Historic house in New York, United States

- U.S. National Register of Historic Places
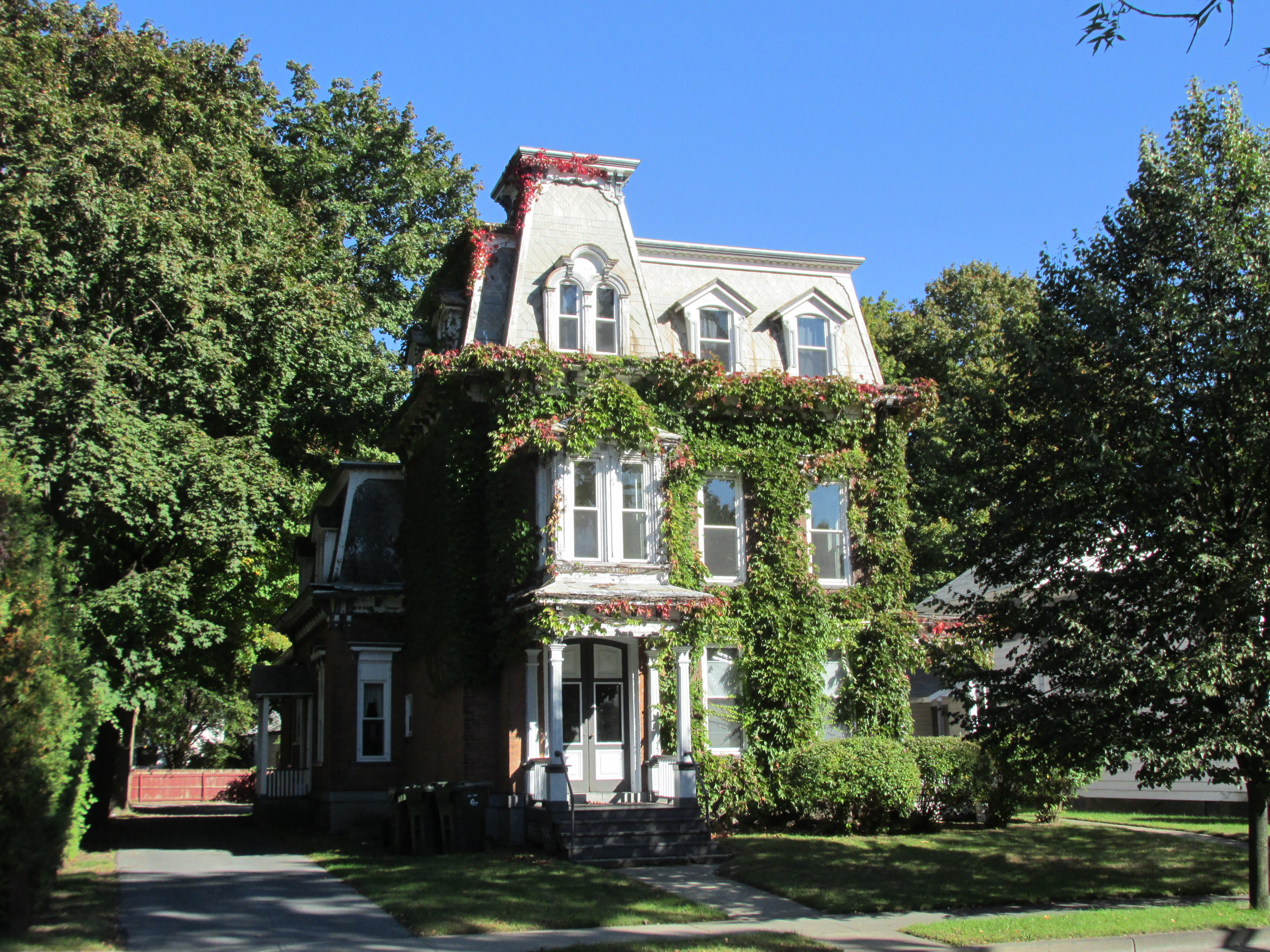
- F. W. Wait House

- Location within New York Location within the United States
- Location: 173-175 Ridge St., Glens Falls, New York
- Coordinates: 43°18′59″N 73°37′52″W
- Area: less than one acre
- Built: 1876
- Architectural style: Second Empire, Italianate
- MPS: Glens Falls MRA
- NRHP reference No.: 84003422
- Added to NRHP: September 29, 1984

F. W. Wait House is a historic home located at Glens Falls, Warren County, New York. It was built about 1876 and is a rectangular, 2 1/2-story, brick residence with a slate mansard roof in a transitional Italianate / Second Empire style. It retains many of its original decorative details.

It was added to the National Register of Historic Places in 1984.

== See also ==
- National Register of Historic Places listings in Warren County, New York
