= Dr. Charles A. Foster House =

Historic house in New York, United States

- U.S. National Register of Historic Places
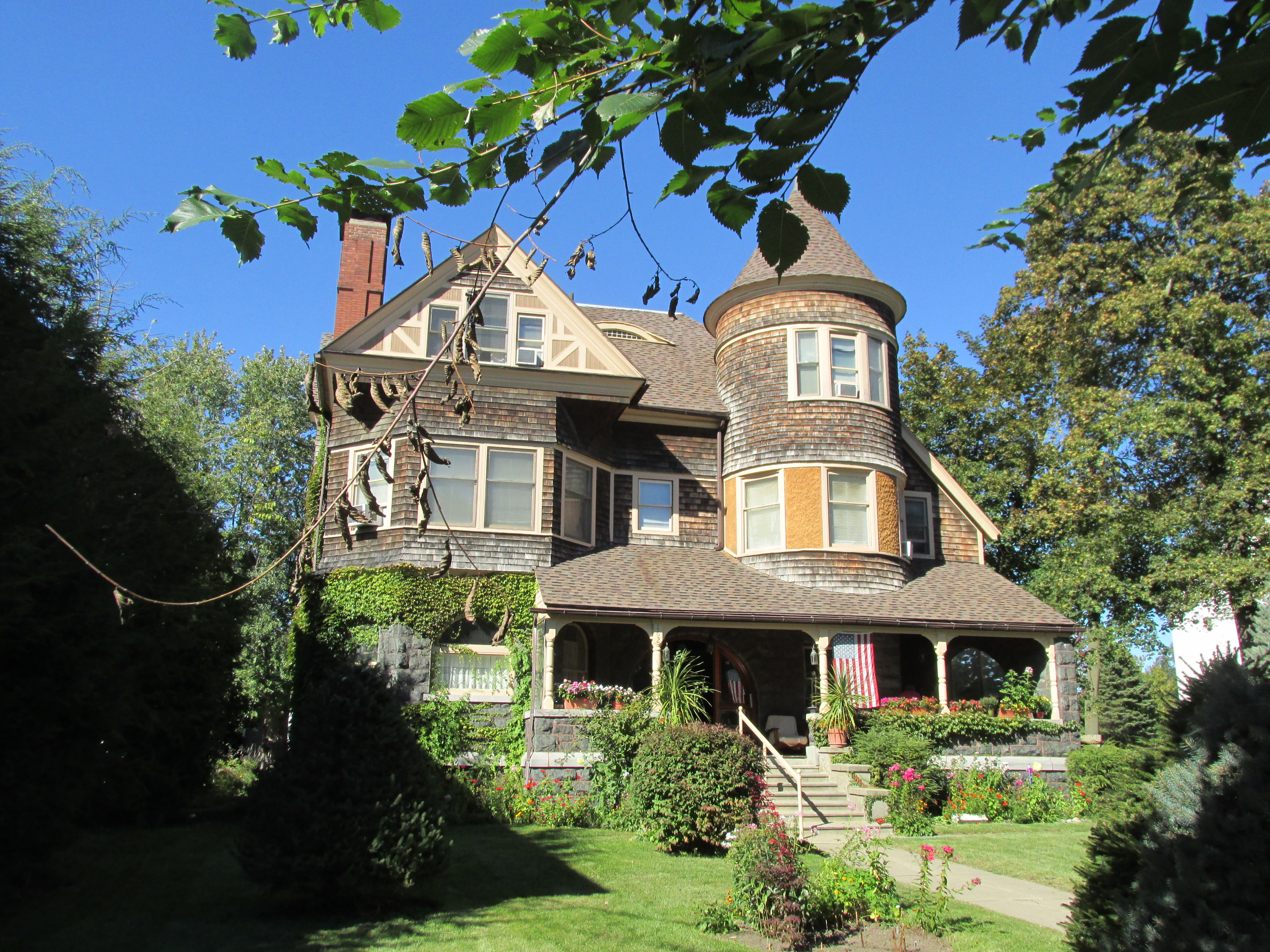
- Dr. Charles A. Foster House

- Location within New York Location within the United States
- Location: 162-164 Warren St., Glens Falls, New York
- Coordinates: 43°18′38″N 73°37′21″W
- Area: less than one acre
- Built: 1889
- Architect: Krum, Irving
- Architectural style: Queen Anne
- MPS: Glens Falls MRA
- NRHP reference No.: 84003321
- Added to NRHP: September 29, 1984

Dr. Charles A. Foster House is a historic home located at Glens Falls, Warren County, New York. It was built in 1889 and is an asymmetrical, 2 1/2-story, stone and frame Queen Anne style residence. It features a 1-story stone porch and cylindrical 2-story tower with conical roof.

It was added to the National Register of Historic Places in 1984.

== See also ==
- National Register of Historic Places listings in Warren County, New York
