= Glens Falls Home for Aged Women =

- U.S. National Register of Historic Places
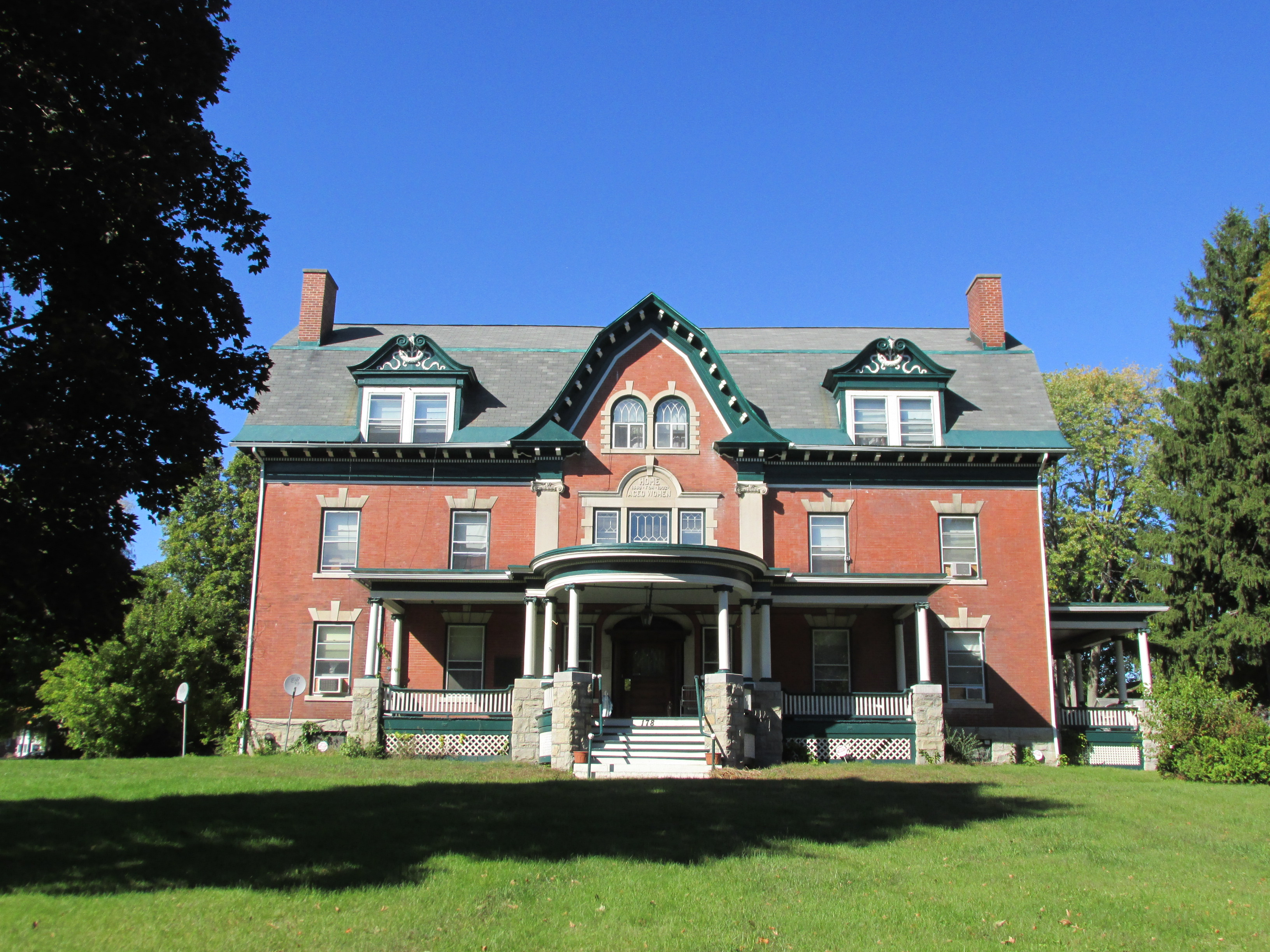
- Glens Falls Home for Aged Women

- Location within New York Location within the United States
- Location: 178-186 Warren St., Glens Falls, New York
- Coordinates: 43°18′51″N 73°37′15″W
- Area: 1 acre (0.40 ha)
- Built: 1903
- Architectural style: Colonial Revival, Georgian Revival
- MPS: Glens Falls MRA
- NRHP reference No.: 84003340
- Added to NRHP: September 29, 1984

Glens Falls Home for Aged Women is a historic residential building located at Glens Falls, Warren County, New York. It was built in 1903 and is a large, T-shaped, 2 1/2-story brick institutional building topped by a gambrel roof in the Colonial Revival style. It features a central entrance pavilion with a gambrel-roofed cross gable and a semi-circular entrance portico.

It was added to the National Register of Historic Places in 1984.

In 2004, the home was purchased by Rocco Andrew Musumeci, Sr. for his family as a summer home. After a decade of personal use, the Glens Falls Home for Aged Women has become a local home of refuge for disadvantaged and disabled individuals. Rocco Musumeci and his family continue to care for the local community and for the Home’s residents.

== See also ==
- National Register of Historic Places listings in Warren County, New York
