= Dr. James Ferguson Office =

- U.S. National Register of Historic Places
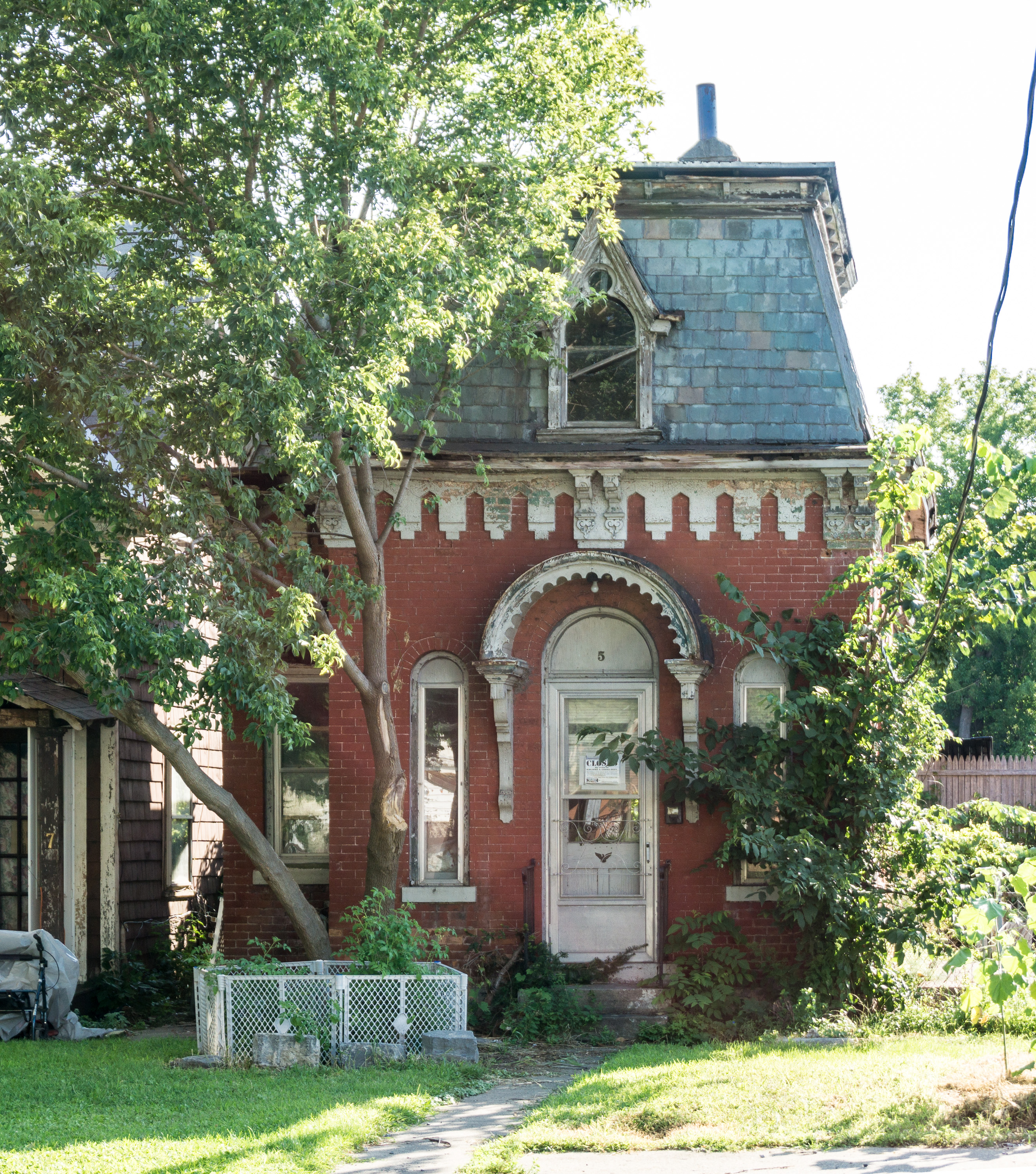

- Location within New York Location within the United States
- Location: 5 Culvert St., Glens Falls, New York
- Coordinates: 43°18′37″N 73°37′36″W
- Area: less than one acre
- Built: 1870
- Architectural style: Second Empire
- MPS: Glens Falls MRA
- NRHP reference No.: 84003282
- Added to NRHP: September 29, 1984

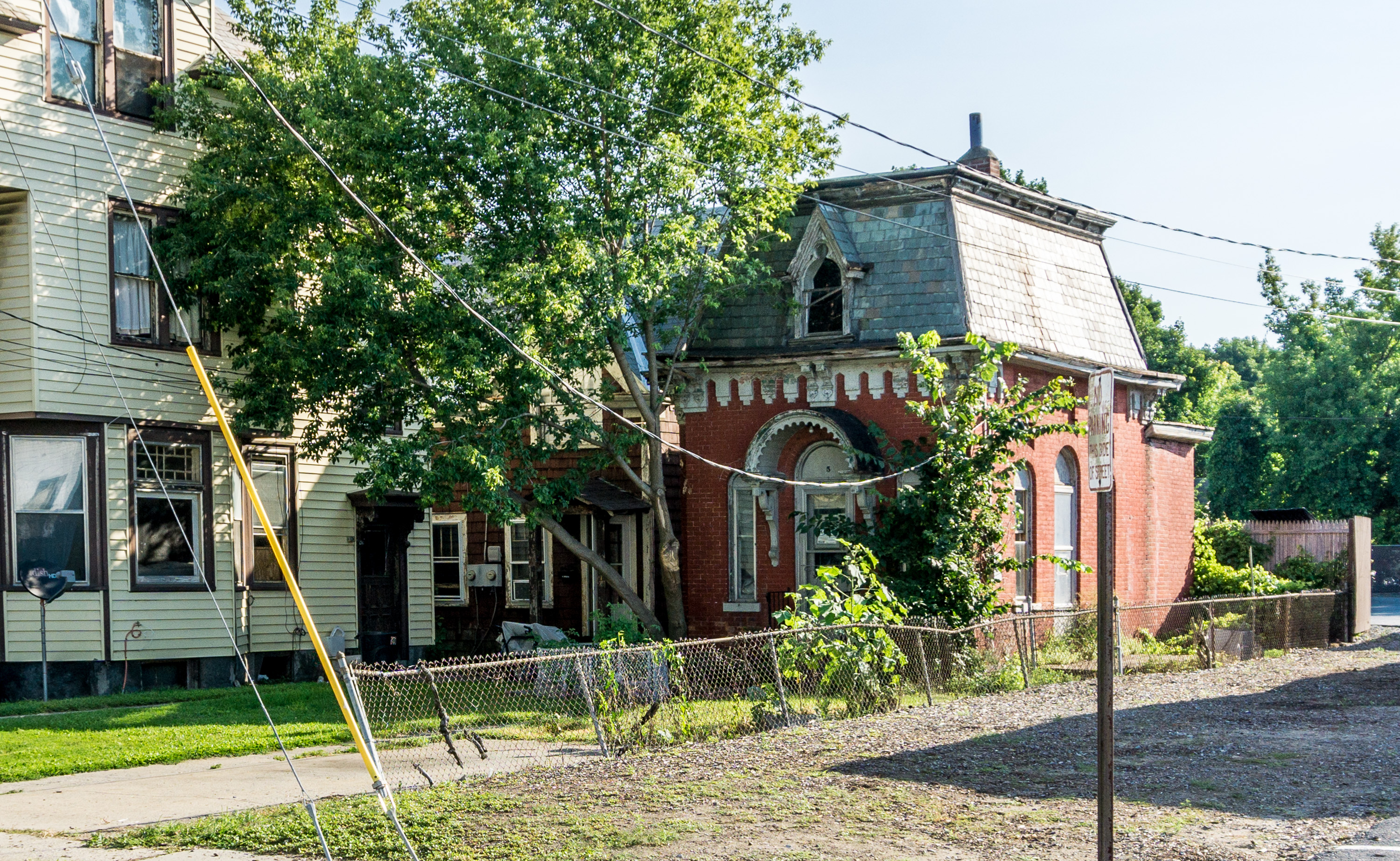
The house is on a residential street. It is set back from the street by quite a bit; it is almost behind the house next to it.

Dr. James Ferguson Office is a historic medical office building located at Glens Falls, Warren County, New York. It was built about 1870 and is a small, square 1 1/2-story Second Empire–style building. It was added to the National Register of Historic Places in 1984. It features a slate mansard roof with a single center dormer.

The building was slated for demolition in 2017 by the city of Glens Falls. A grass-roots restoration campaign resulted in the building's preservation. It was awarded the Excellence in Historic Preservation Award in 2020 by the Preservation League of New York State.

== See also ==
- National Register of Historic Places listings in Warren County, New York
