= Addison B. Colvin House =

Historic house in New York, United States

- U.S. National Register of Historic Places
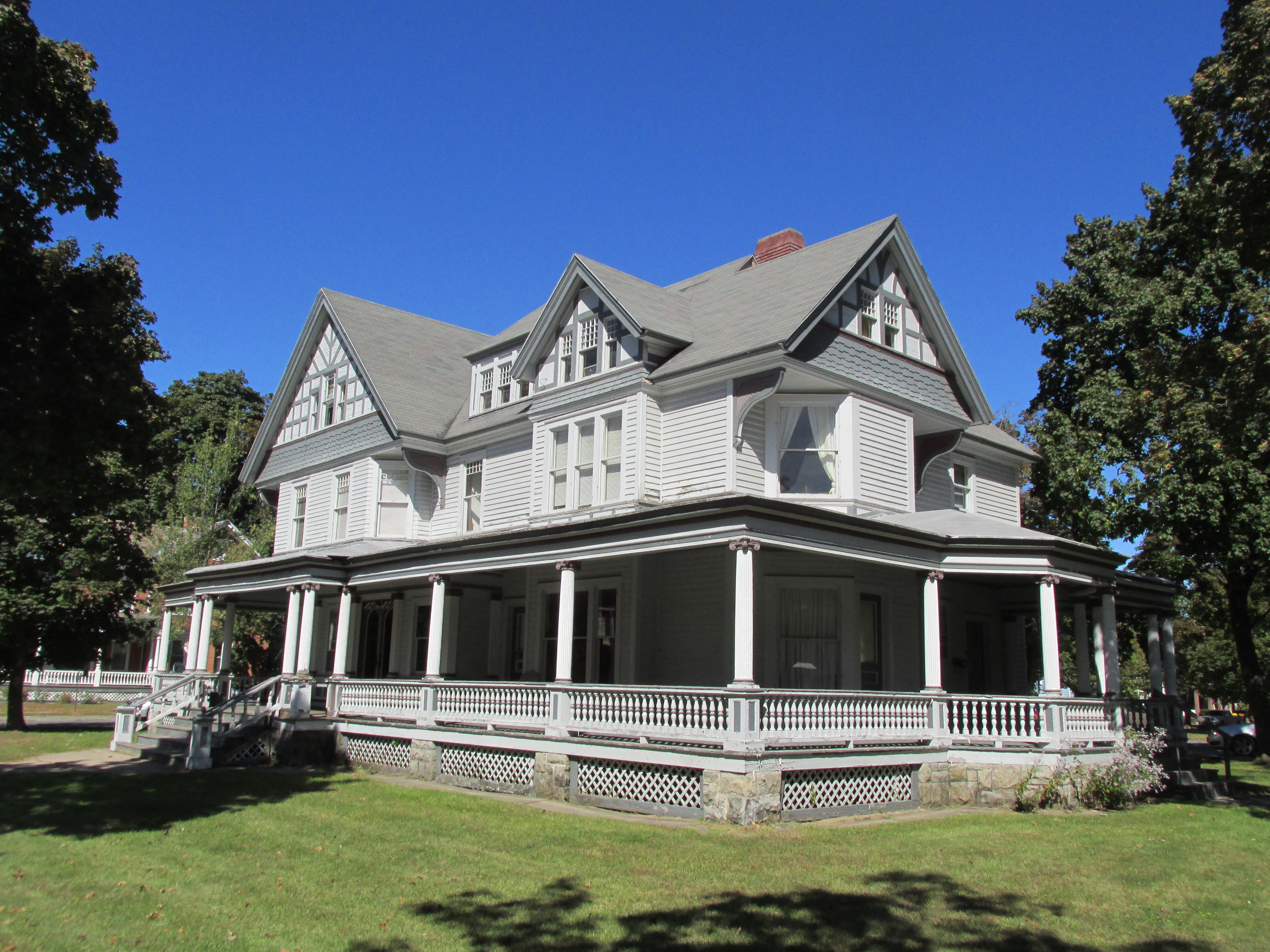

- Location within New York Location within the United States
- Location: 453-455 Glen St., Glens Falls, New York
- Coordinates: 43°18′53″N 73°38′24″W
- Area: less than one acre
- Built: 1890
- Architectural style: Colonial Revival, Queen Anne
- MPS: Glens Falls MRA
- NRHP reference No.: 84003251
- Added to NRHP: September 29, 1984

The Addison B. Colvin House is a historic house located at 453-455 Glen Street in Glens Falls, Warren County, New York.

== Description and history ==
It was built about in 1890, and is a large, rambling, 2 1/2-story, L-shaped frame residence designed in the Queen Anne style. It features a one-story wraparound porch with Colonial Revival style design elements.

It was added to the National Register of Historic Places on September 29, 1984.

== See also ==
- National Register of Historic Places listings in Warren County, New York
