= Jones Ordway House =

Historic house in New York, United States

- U.S. National Register of Historic Places
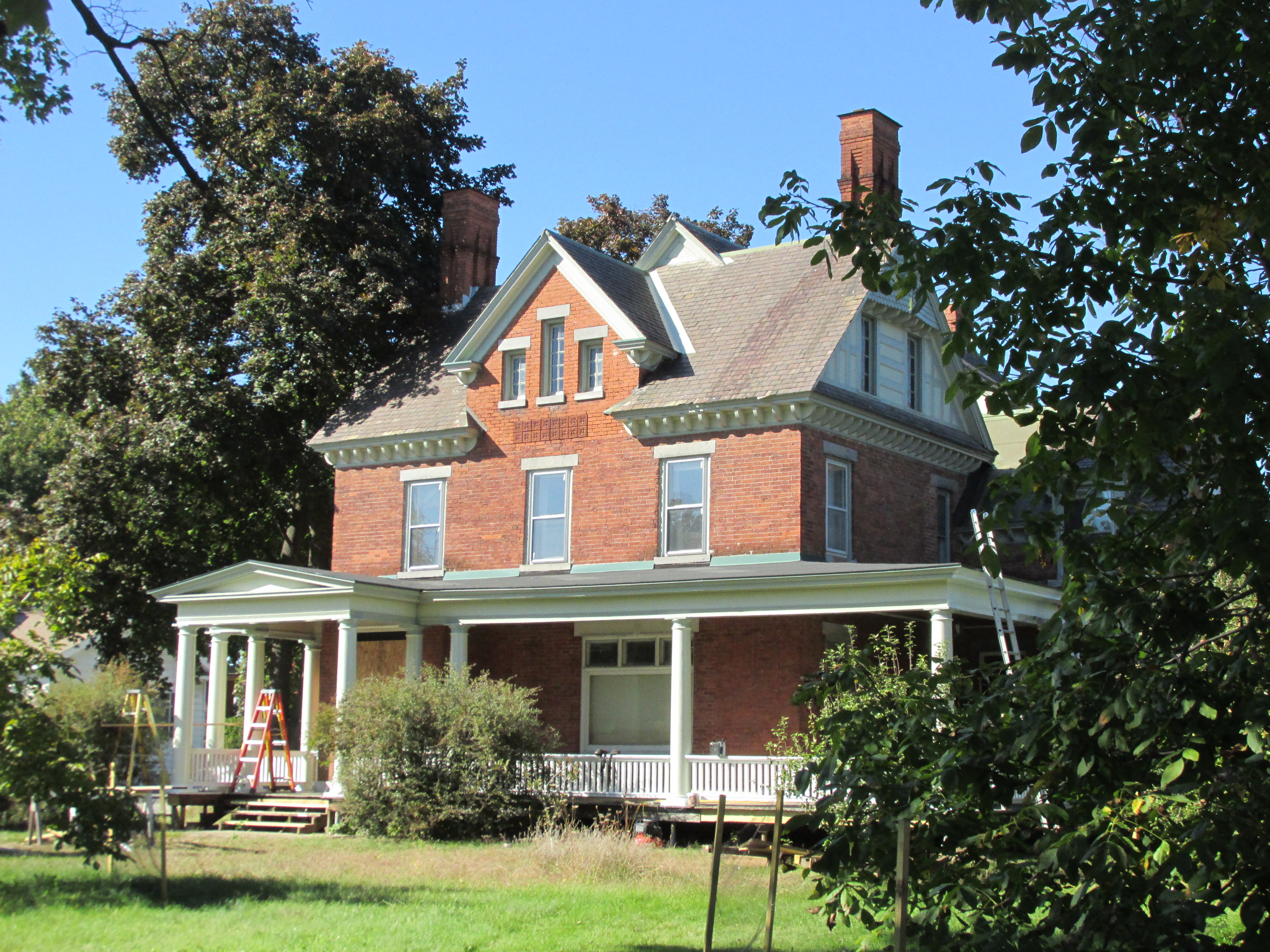
- Jones Ordway House

- Location within New York Location within the United States
- Location: 142 Warren St., Glens Falls, New York
- Coordinates: 43°18′39.2″N 73°38′10.6″W
- Area: less than one acre
- Built: 1850
- Architectural style: Queen Anne
- MPS: Glens Falls MRA
- NRHP reference No.: 84003376
- Added to NRHP: September 29, 1984

Jones Ordway House is a historic home located at Glens Falls, Warren County, New York. It was built about 1850 and is a 2 1/2-story, T-shaped brick vernacular residence. It was extensively remodeled in the 1880s in a picturesque Queen Anne style.

It was added to the National Register of Historic Places in 1984.

== See also ==
- National Register of Historic Places listings in Warren County, New York
