= Joubert and White Building =

Historic commercial building in New York, United States

- U.S. National Register of Historic Places
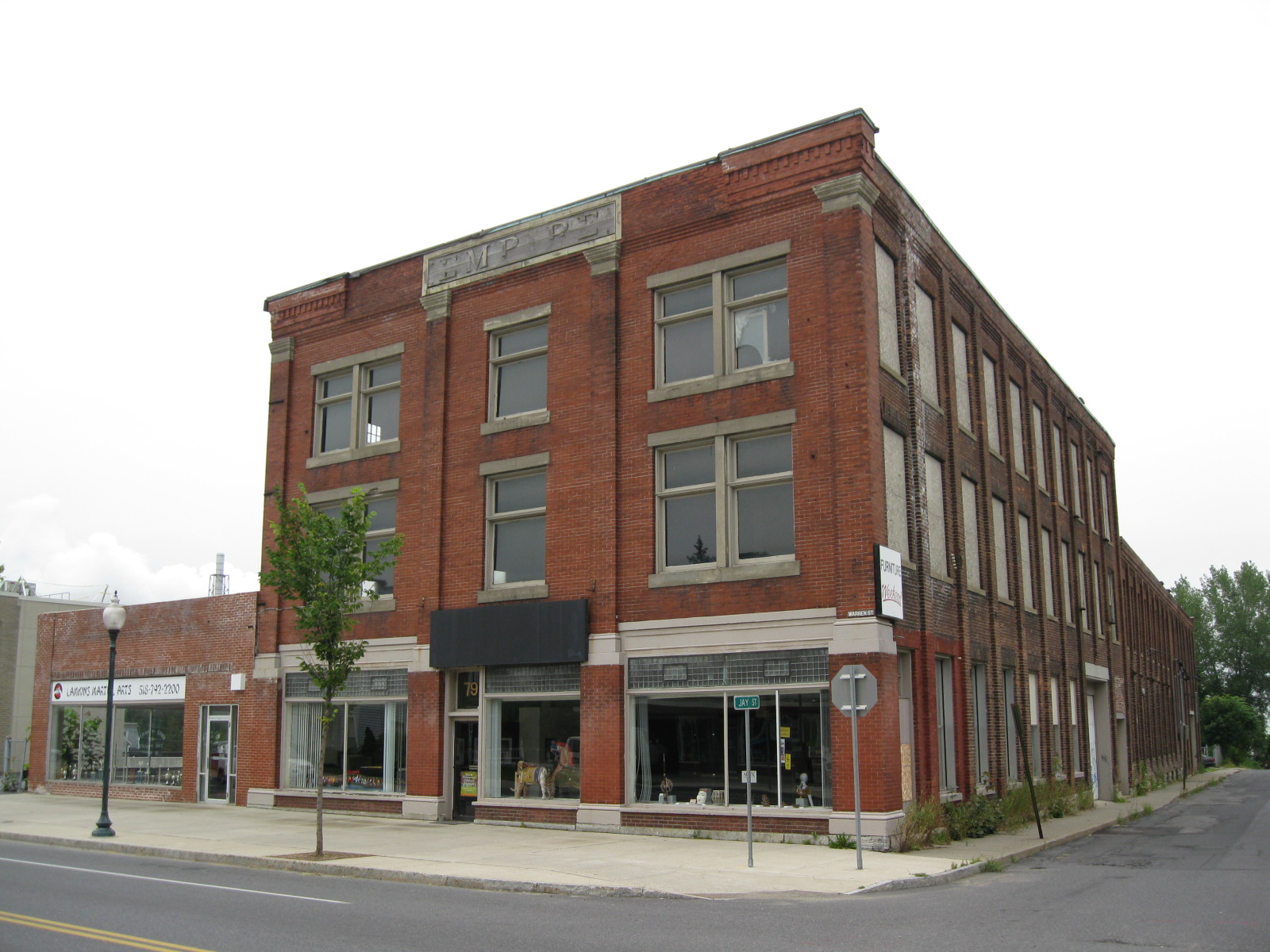
- Joubert and White Building, August 2009

- Location within New York Location within the United States
- Location: 77-79 Warren St., Glens Falls, New York
- Coordinates: 43°18′33″N 73°37′42″W
- Area: 1 acre (0.40 ha)
- Built: 1864
- MPS: Glens Falls MRA
- NRHP reference No.: 84003360
- Added to NRHP: September 29, 1984

The Joubert and White Building is located at 77-79 Warren Street (formerly 45-47 Warren Street) in Glens Falls, New York. The property was acquired in 1864 to be the corporate headquarters and manufacturing facility for Joubert and White Company - manufacturers of high-grade buckboards. The building is located at the corner of Warren and Jay streets.

The Joubert and White Building is a three-story, flat-roofed, brick factory structure above a cut limestone foundation. The building was added to the National Register of Historic Places in 1984.

== Construction ==
In 1864, after borrowing $50, Edward Joubert and J. Huyler White formed a partnership and began to develop a 18,000-square-foot (1,700 m^{2}) manufacturing building at what was then 45-47 Warren Street (now 77-79 Warren Street) The building consisted of a large building for manufacturing, a second building on Jay Street was used for storage of completed vehicles and a lumberyard where their lumber was seasoned until ready to use.

== Joubert and White Company ==
Joubert and White began the manufacture of high-grade buckboards in Glens Falls in 1865. They were the innovators and inventors of a famous model that was known for its suspension system and was sought by many wealthy people here and abroad. Notable owners of the buckboard included Cornelius Vanderbilt, John Jacob Astor, J. Pierpont Morgan, Louis Tiffany, Spencer Trask, Andrew Carnegie and John D. Rockefeller. A standard buckboard was constructed by running two planks of wood between the front and rear axles and mounting the passenger seat body on the planks. The only shock absorption was in the flexibility of the planks. When riding on the rough roads of their day, passengers felt like they were riding a bucking horse, hence the name. Joubert devised a way to attach two steel leaf springs, bowed upwards to the planks, with the passenger seat attached to the top of the springs. The seats moved vertically on the springs and also rocked forward and back, making for a more cushioned ride. In 1880, Joubert patented his suspension design in 1880. Some 50 carriage and sleigh models by Joubert and White were considered to be of superior quality. A good buggy would sell for $50 to $75, while the Joubert and White buckboard might cost $500 to $800 with some as high as $1000 or more if customized.

By 1897 the company had 35 employees, made 75 vehicles annually and reached $50,000 in sales. Joubert handled the manufacturing details for the firm before he died in 1890. White, who handled sales, kept the business and traveled the country as the "Buckboard King" taking mail orders by catalog. Production continued into the 20th century, only falling off with the coming of the gasoline-powered automobiles. When White died in 1916, the company went out of business with assets of $100,000, which were divided among the heirs of Joubert and White.

== Empire Automobile Company ==
Starting in 1910, the Joubert and White Building also housed the Empire Automobile Company owned by D.H. Cowles and Frank M. Starbuck. Catering to the affluent of the Saratoga Springs, New York-Adirondack Mountains resort-touring season, Cowles and Starbuck provided an automobile storage and repair facility. Patrons had the opportunity to have their autos serviced overnight, before continuing via auto or carriage to their destinations in the Adirondacks. In 1933, Empire Automotive began to share their space with Comac Sales, Inc. - another automobile dealership. Empire Auto remained in business until 1935, dealing in such brands as Chevrolet, Cadillac, Essex, Hudson, and LaSalle automobiles, as well as GMC trucks.

== Decline and Rehabilitation ==
After the closing of Empire Automobile Company, Comac Sales, Inc., a Chevrolet dealer, occupied the building until 1956 when it changed ownership and became Whiteman Chevrolet. Whiteman remained in the Joubet and White Building until 1957, when they moved to their current location on Dix Avenue in Glens Falls. The Joubert and White Building remained vacant until it was occupied by Campbell Wholesale Plumbing and Heating Corporation in 1960. The Joubert and White Building housed various businesses after the closing of Campbell in 1970, including Armando Candle Mill Inc., a Parts Plus auto part store, an H&R Block tax preparation store, and a martial arts studio, before then becoming warehouse space for Glen Street Associates in 2008. In 2011 the building was renovated and leased for commercial and residential use under the name Warren Street Square.

== See also ==
- National Register of Historic Places listings in Warren County, New York
