= First Presbyterian Church (Glens Falls, New York) =

Historic church in New York, United States

- First Presbyterian Church of Glens Falls
- U.S. National Register of Historic Places
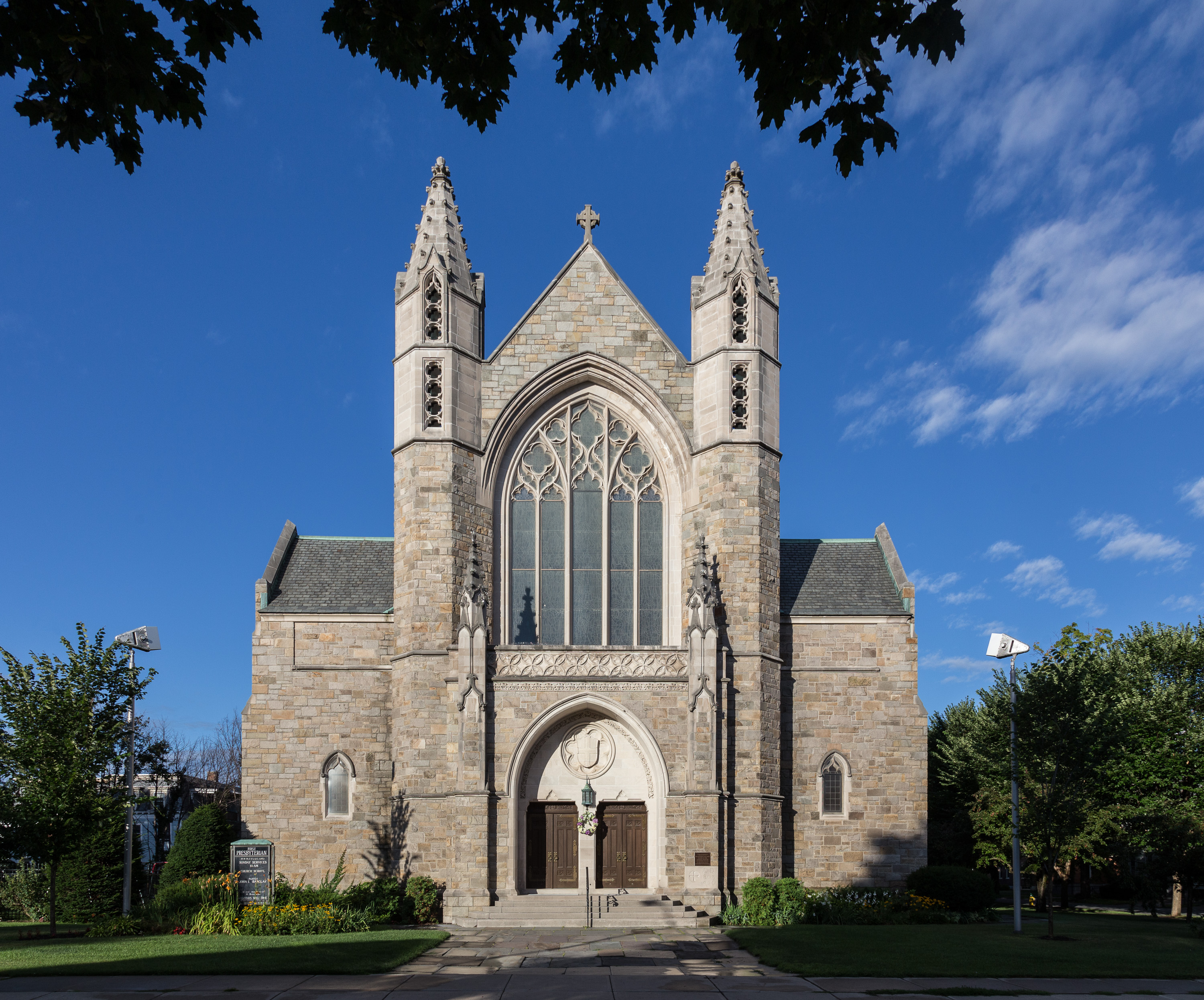
- First Presbyterian Church

- Location within New York Location within the United States
- Location: 402-410 Glen St., Glens Falls, New York
- Coordinates: 43°18′44″N 73°38′21″W
- Area: less than one acre
- Built: 1929
- Architect: Cram & Ferguson; Miner, Edward F., Building Co.
- Architectural style: Late Gothic Revival
- MPS: Glens Falls MRA
- NRHP reference No.: 84003314
- Added to NRHP: September 29, 1984

First Presbyterian Church is a historic Presbyterian church at 402-410 Glen Street in Glens Falls, New York. Completed in 1929, this church took three years to build. It is a substantial stone Neo-gothic-style church in a cruciform plan. It was designed by architect Ralph Adams Cram (1863-1942).

It was the spiritual home to former Representative Gerald B.H. Solomon, and his funeral was held in the building. Philanthropist, Charles R. Wood attended and his funeral service was in 2004. It was also attended by Speaker Dennis Hastert, Governor George Pataki, and other representatives.

The church was added to the National Register of Historic Places in 1984.

Explore the church's website for info on services, ministries, and more.

== See also ==
- National Register of Historic Places listings in Warren County, New York
