= A. S. Rugge House =

Historic home in Glens Falls, New York, US

- U.S. National Register of Historic Places
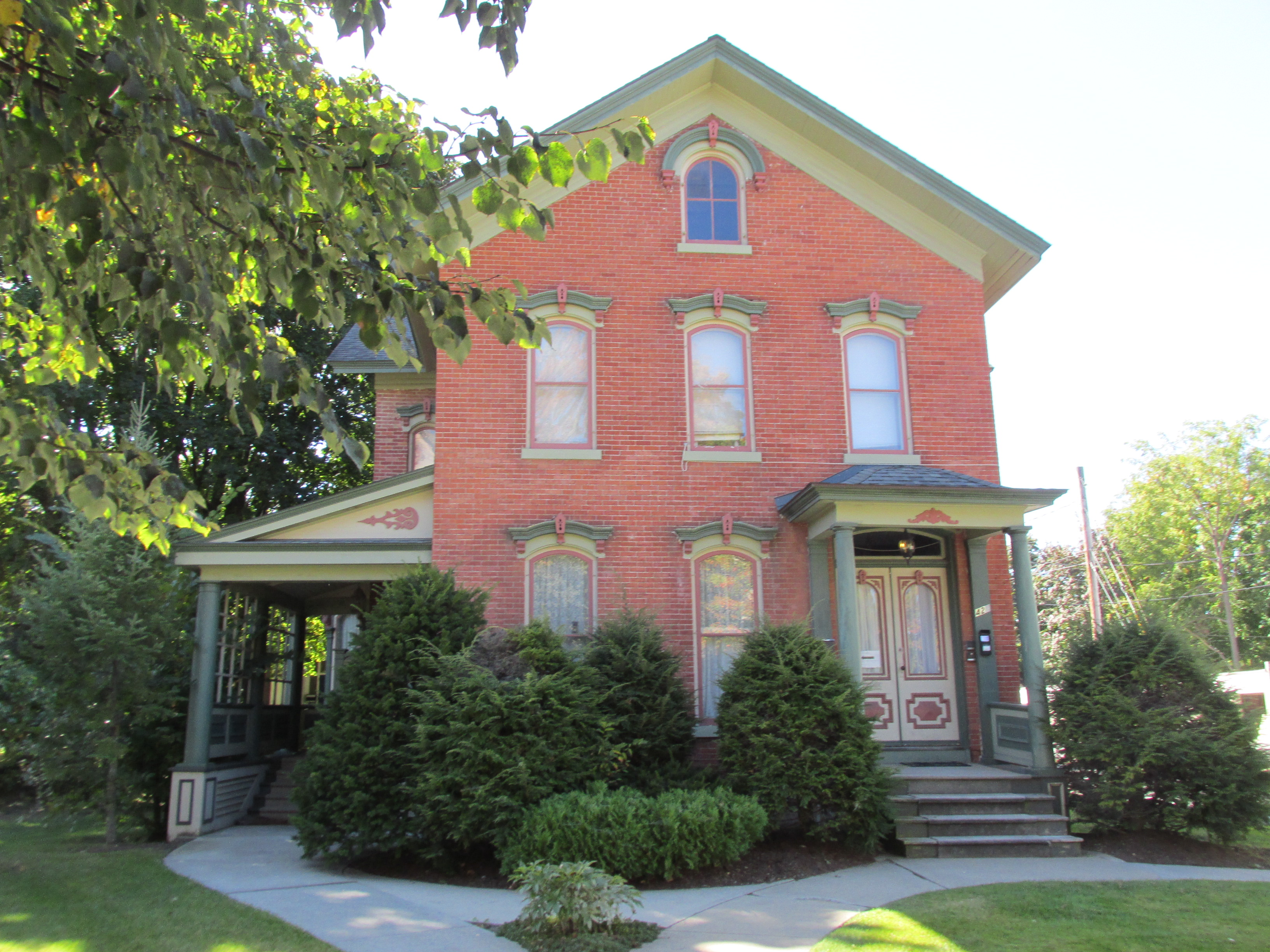
- A. S. Rugge House

- Location within New York Location within the United States
- Location: 428 Glen St., Glens Falls, New York
- Coordinates: 43°18′44″N 73°38′23″W
- Area: less than one acre
- Built: 1880
- Architectural style: Italianate
- MPS: Glens Falls MRA
- NRHP reference No.: 84003394
- Added to NRHP: September 29, 1984

A. S. Rugge House is a historic home located at Glens Falls, Warren County, New York. It was built about 1880 and is a 2 1/2-story, gable-roofed brick Italianate style residence. It features 1-story side and entrance porches with turned posts and paneled balustrades.

It was added to the National Register of Historic Places in 1984.

== See also ==
- National Register of Historic Places listings in Warren County, New York
