= Stephen T. Birdsall House =

Historic house in New York, United States

- U.S. National Register of Historic Places
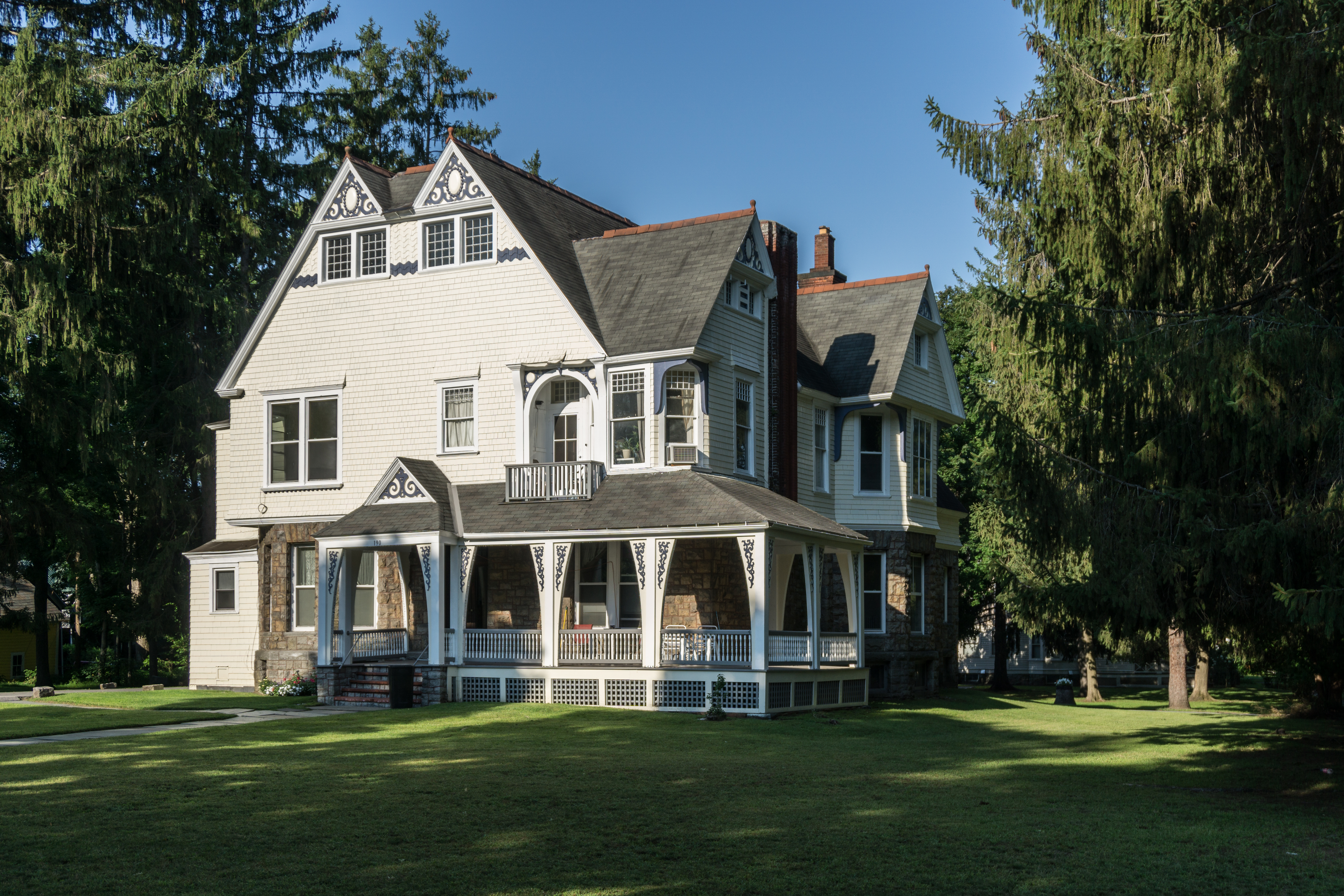

- Location within New York Location within the United States
- Location: 186-192 Ridge St., Glens Falls, New York
- Coordinates: 43°19′2″N 73°37′54″W
- Area: 1.4 acres (0.57 ha)
- Built: 1884
- Architectural style: Queen Anne
- MPS: Glens Falls MRA
- NRHP reference No.: 84003245
- Added to NRHP: September 29, 1984

The Stephen T. Birdsall House is a historic house located at 186–192 Ridge Street in Glens Falls, Warren County, New York.

== Description and history ==
It was built in 1884, and is a 2 1/2-story, asymmetrical, shingle-covered Queen Anne–style frame residence. It features a slate-covered roof with multiple gables on several sides and a partial wrap-around porch at ground level. Also on the property is a contributing carriage house.

It was added to the National Register of Historic Places on September 29, 1984.

== See also ==
- National Register of Historic Places listings in Warren County, New York
