= Fredella Avenue Historic District =

Historic district in New York, United States

- U.S. National Register of Historic Places
- U.S. Historic district
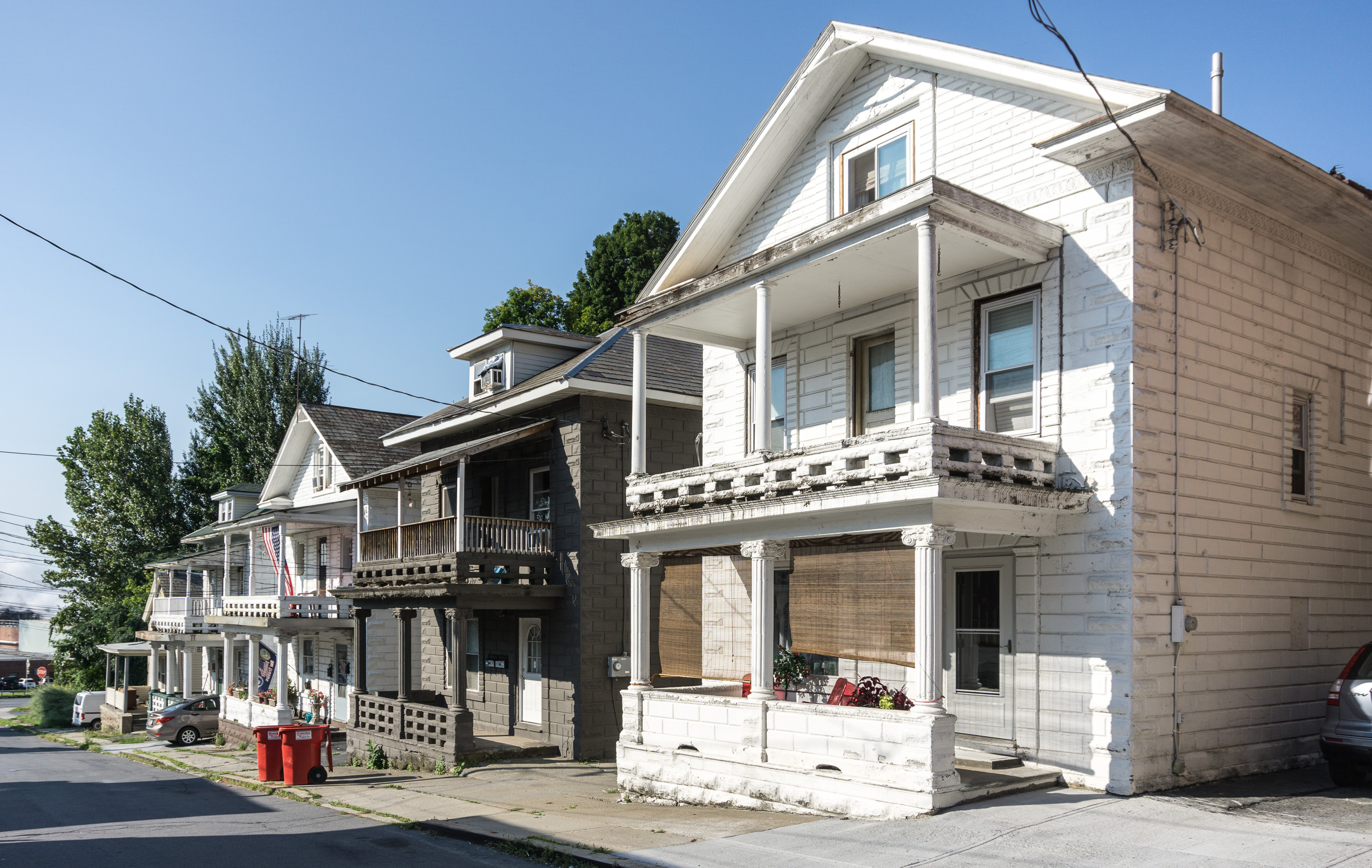

- Location within New York Location within the United States
- Location: 15-21R Fredella Ave., Glens Falls, New York
- Coordinates: 43°18′32″N 73°38′23″W
- Area: less than one acre
- Built: 1912
- Architect: Fredella, Joseph J.
- Architectural style: Classical Revival
- MPS: Fredella Concrete Block Structures TR
- NRHP reference No.: 84003328
- Added to NRHP: September 29, 1984

Fredella Avenue Historic District is a national historic district located at Glens Falls, Warren County, New York. It includes eight contributing buildings. They are multi-story concrete residential buildings built as speculative housing for Italian immigrant families. They are built of molded concrete block and decorated with cast concrete trim and characterized by two-story porches with concrete fluted columns. They were built between 1914 and 1918 and located based on their proximity to local stone quarries.

It was added to the National Register of Historic Places in 1984.

== See also ==
- National Register of Historic Places listings in Warren County, New York
