= Queensbury Quaker Burying Ground =

Historic cemetery in New York, United States

- U.S. National Register of Historic Places
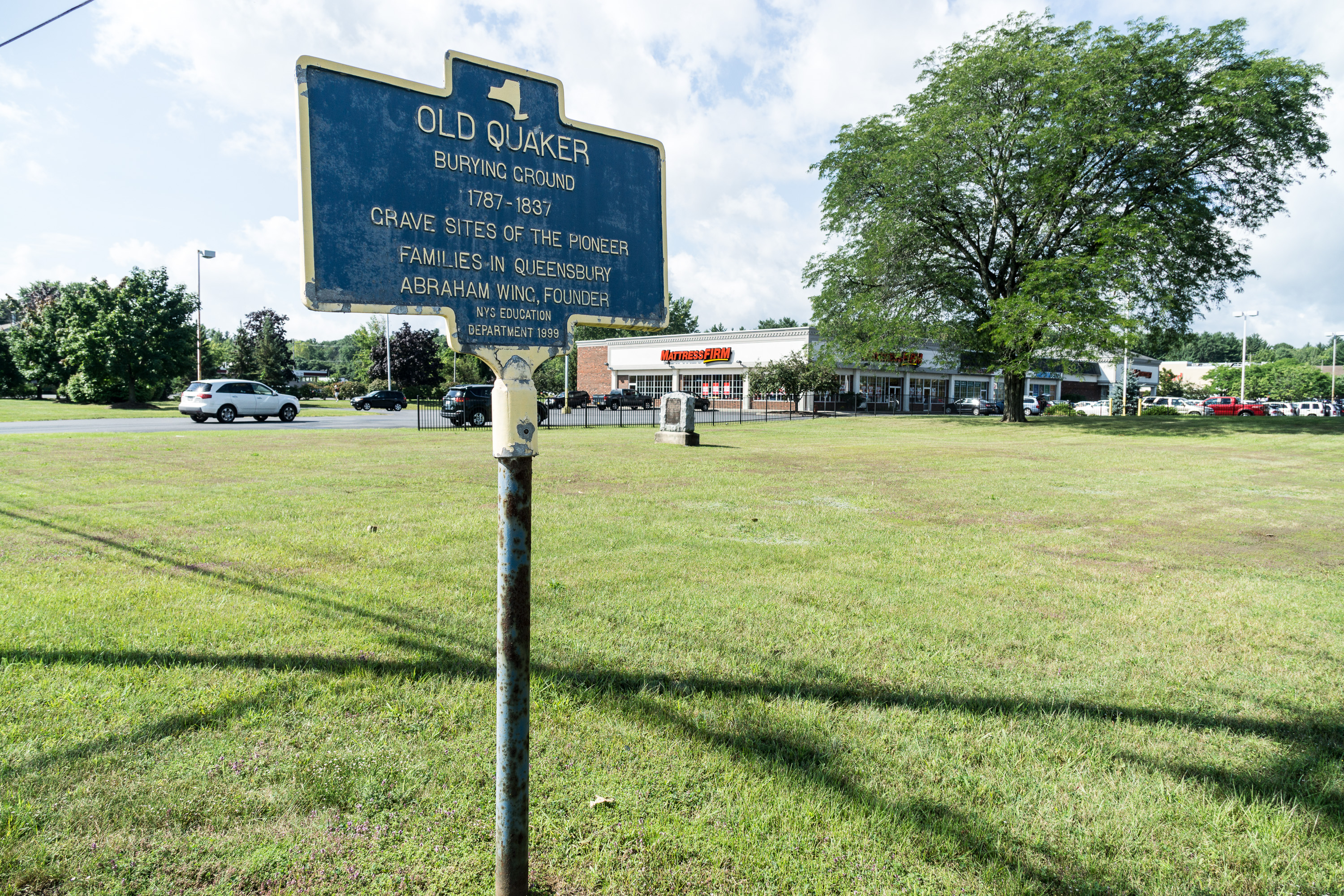

- Location within New York Location within the United States
- Location: Bay & Quaker Rds., Queensbury, New York
- Coordinates: 44°19′55″N 73°39′12″W
- Area: 0.53 acres (0.21 ha)
- Built: c. 1765-1837
- NRHP reference No.: 15000035
- Added to NRHP: February 23, 2015

Queensbury Quaker Burying Ground, also known as the Queensbury Friends Cemetery and Old Quaker Cemetery, is a historic Quaker burying ground located near Queensbury in Warren County, New York. It was established about 1765 and remained in service until 1837.

This cemetery was the first in Queensbury.

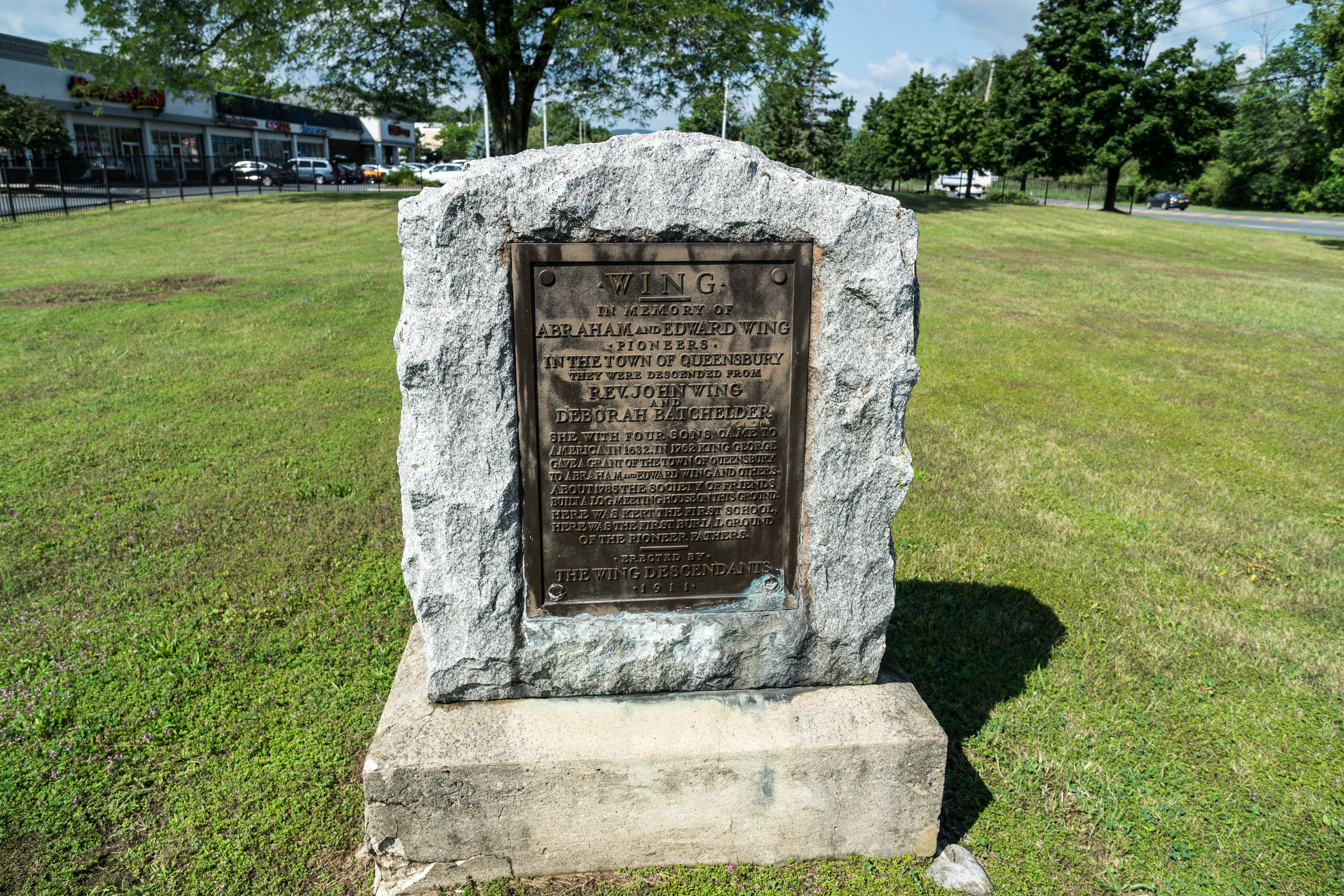
1911 marker

A commemorative marker was installed in 1911 by the Wing family to honor that family's role in the settlement of Queensbury. The burial ground contains approximately 80 burials.

The site was the location of a Quaker Meeting House and school, as well as cemetery. Today the site is a fenced patch of grassy ground next to a shopping center, marked by two plaques. The cemetery has no gravestones, in keeping with Quaker tradition of the time. In 2002, during planning for the shopping center, an archaeological survey was conducted. The burials were discovered, and the land deeded to Queensbury in perpetuity.

The site was listed on the National Register of Historic Places in 2015.
