= Three Squares Historic District =

Historic district in New York, United States

- U.S. National Register of Historic Places
- U.S. Historic district
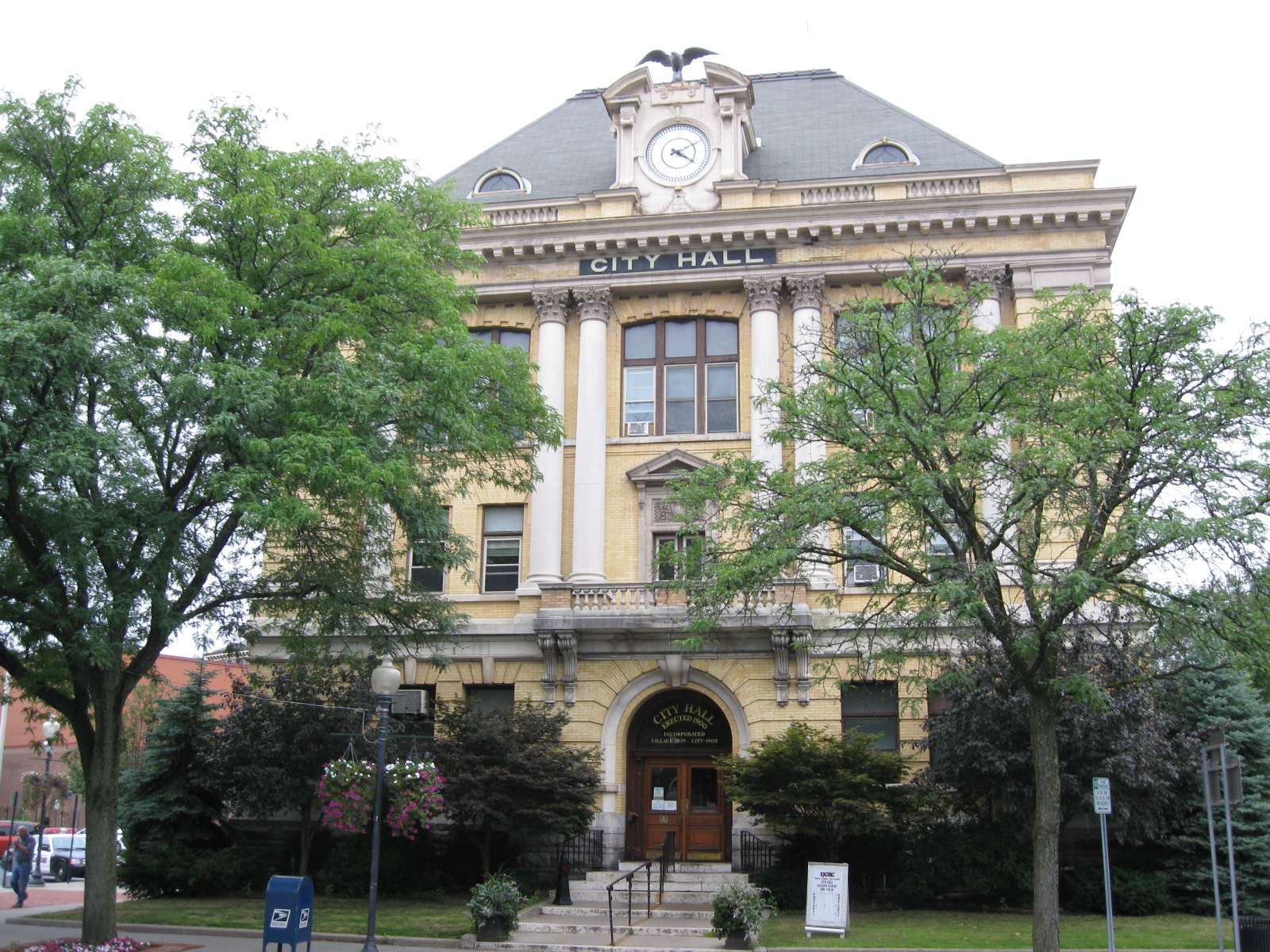
- Glens Falls City Hall (1900), August 2009

- Location within New York Location within the United States
- Location: Roughly South, Glen, Maple, and Ridge Sts., Glens Falls, New York
- Coordinates: 43°18′32″N 73°38′0″W
- Area: 23 acres (9.3 ha)
- Built: 1902
- Architect: Multiple
- Architectural style: Late 19th And 20th Century Revivals, Late Victorian, Federal
- MPS: Glens Falls MRA
- NRHP reference No.: 84003420 (original); 100008374 (increase)

Significant dates
- Added to NRHP: September 29, 1984
- Boundary increase: November 15, 2022

Three Squares Historic District is a national historic district located at Glens Falls, Warren County, New York. It includes 75 contributing buildings, one contributing site, and one contributing object. It encompasses Glens Falls historic and contemporary commercial center. The buildings generally consist of brick commercial, office, and institutional structures between two and five stories in height. Because of devastating fires in 1862 and 1902, the majority of the buildings were built between 1902 and 1930. Notable buildings include the Italianate style Cowles block (1865), Neoclassical style Rogers Building (1926-1927), Beaux-Arts style Empire Theater (1899), and Neoclassical style Glens Falls City Hall (1900).

It was added to the National Register of Historic Places in 1984, with boundary changes approved in 2022.
