= George H. Parks House =

Historic house in New York, United States

- U.S. National Register of Historic Places
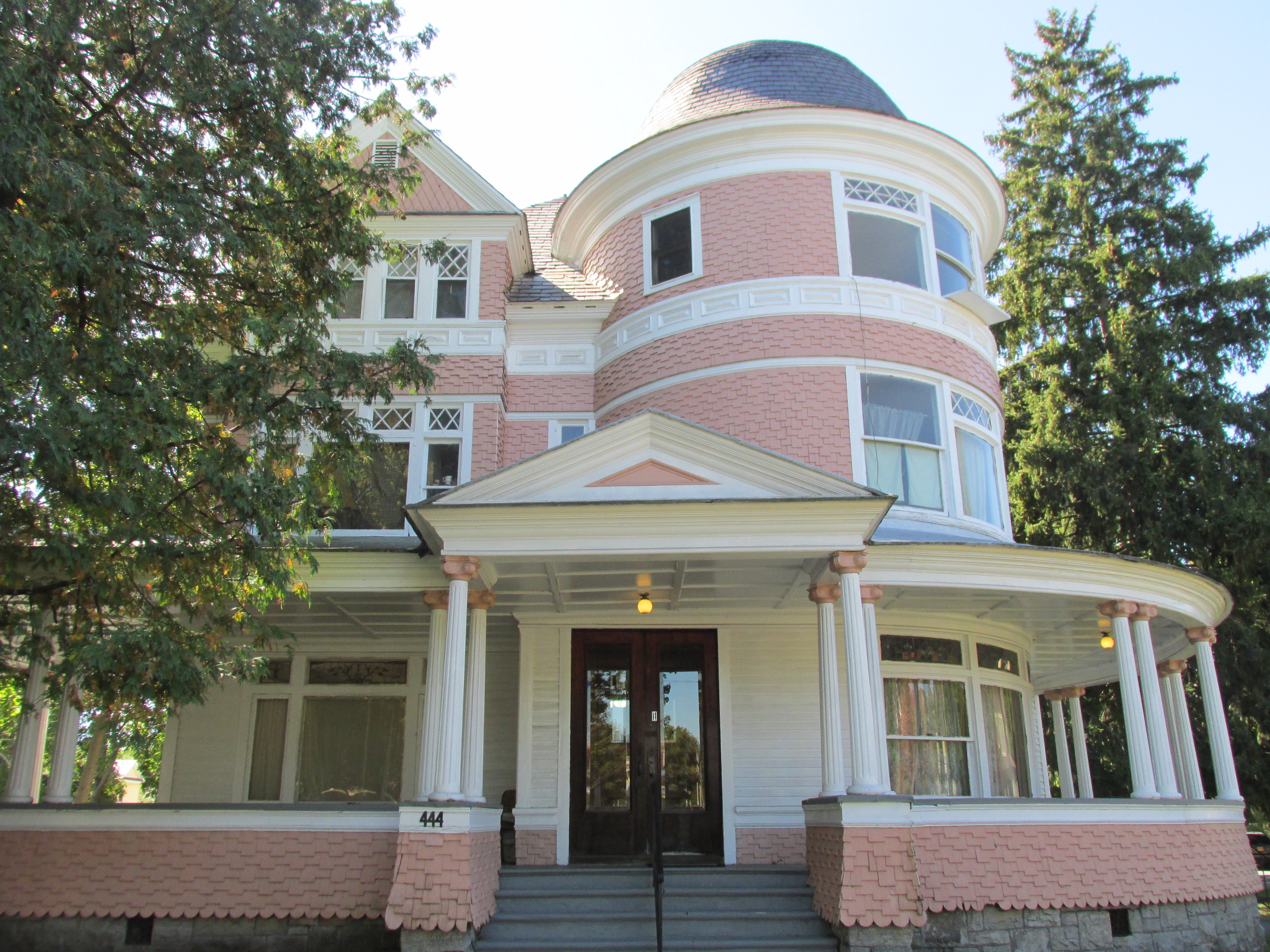

- Location within New York Location within the United States
- Location: 444 Glen St., Glens Falls, New York
- Coordinates: 43°18′50″N 73°38′25″W
- Area: less than one acre
- Built: 1900
- Architectural style: Queen Anne
- MPS: Glens Falls MRA
- NRHP reference No.: 84003378
- Added to NRHP: September 29, 1984

George H. Parks House is a historic home located at Glens Falls, Warren County, New York. It was built about 1900 and is a three-story, substantial, asymmetrical Queen Anne style residence covered by a slate hipped roof. It features a first story wraparound porch and porte cochere. It also features a massive cylindrical tower surmounted by a bell-cast slate roof.

It was added to the National Register of Historic Places in 1984.
