= Bemis Eye Sanitarium Complex =

- U.S. National Register of Historic Places
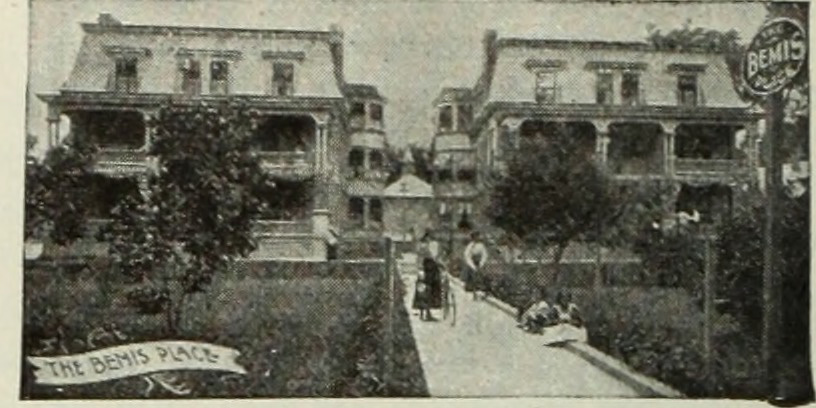
- Image from page 45 of "The literary digest" (1890). The left building still stands; the right one is gone.

- Location within New York Location within the United States
- Location: Glen Street, Sherman Street, Glens Falls, New York
- Coordinates: 43°18′43″N 73°39′1″W
- Area: 3 acres (1.2 ha)
- Built: 1893
- Architect: Potter, Ephraim B.
- Architectural style: Italianate, Queen Anne
- MPS: Glens Falls MRA
- NRHP reference No.: 84003243
- Added to NRHP: September 29, 1984

Bemis Eye Sanitarium Complex is a historic sanatorium complex located at Glens Falls, Warren County, New York. The complex was built between about 1893 and 1902 and consists of eight contributing structures. The architect was Ephraim Potter. There are five boarding houses built for the sanitarium, as well as two previously existing residences and a carriage house that were converted for sanitarium use in the 1890s.

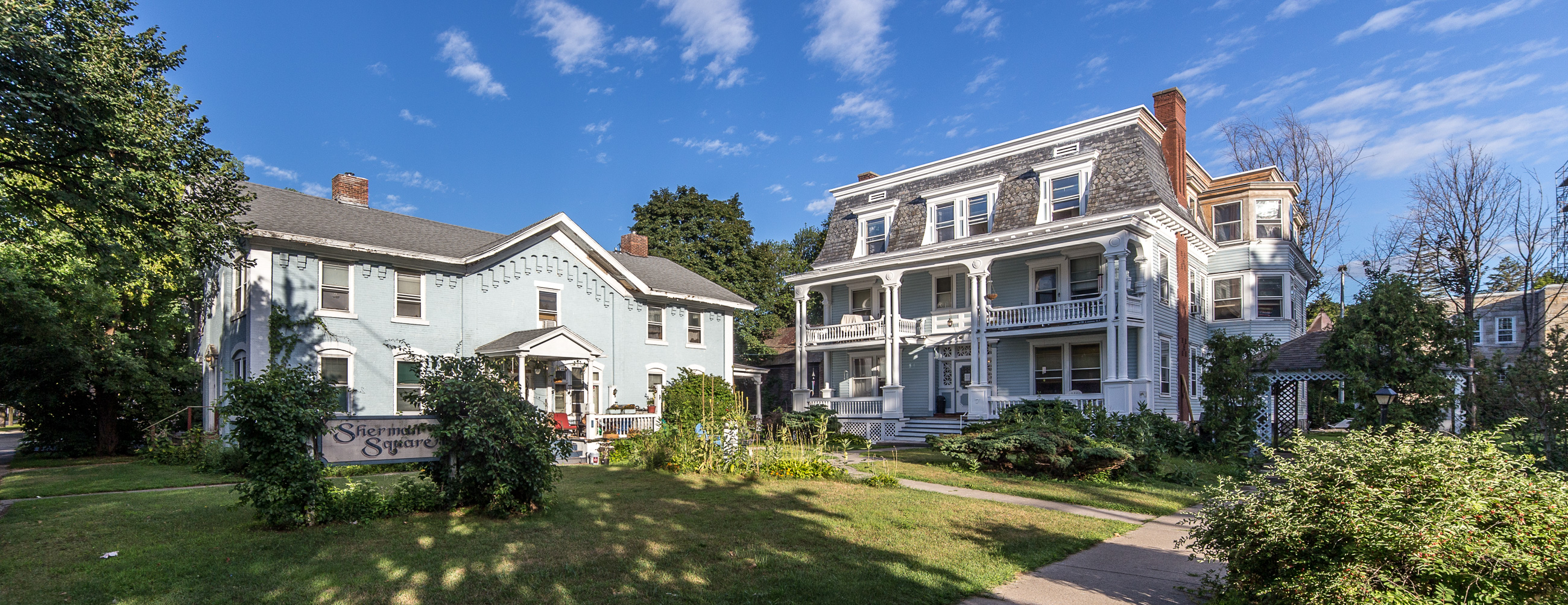
These buildings of the Bemis Eye Sanitarium Complex are now the Sherman Square Apartments on Sherman Avenue.

Dr. Edward Herbert Bemis built the complex for the treatment of eye diseases. The sanitarium closed after his death in 1901.

It was added to the National Register of Historic Places in 1984.

At least two of the buildings of the complex, on Sherman Avenue, were later re-purposed as the Sherman Square Apartments. These buildings suffered a severe fire on May 8, 2014. The interior was gutted, but the exterior was salvaged, and the apartment complex was expected to be eventually re-opened.

== See also ==
- National Register of Historic Places listings in Warren County, New York
