= Enoch Rosekrans House =

Historic house in New York, United States

- U.S. National Register of Historic Places
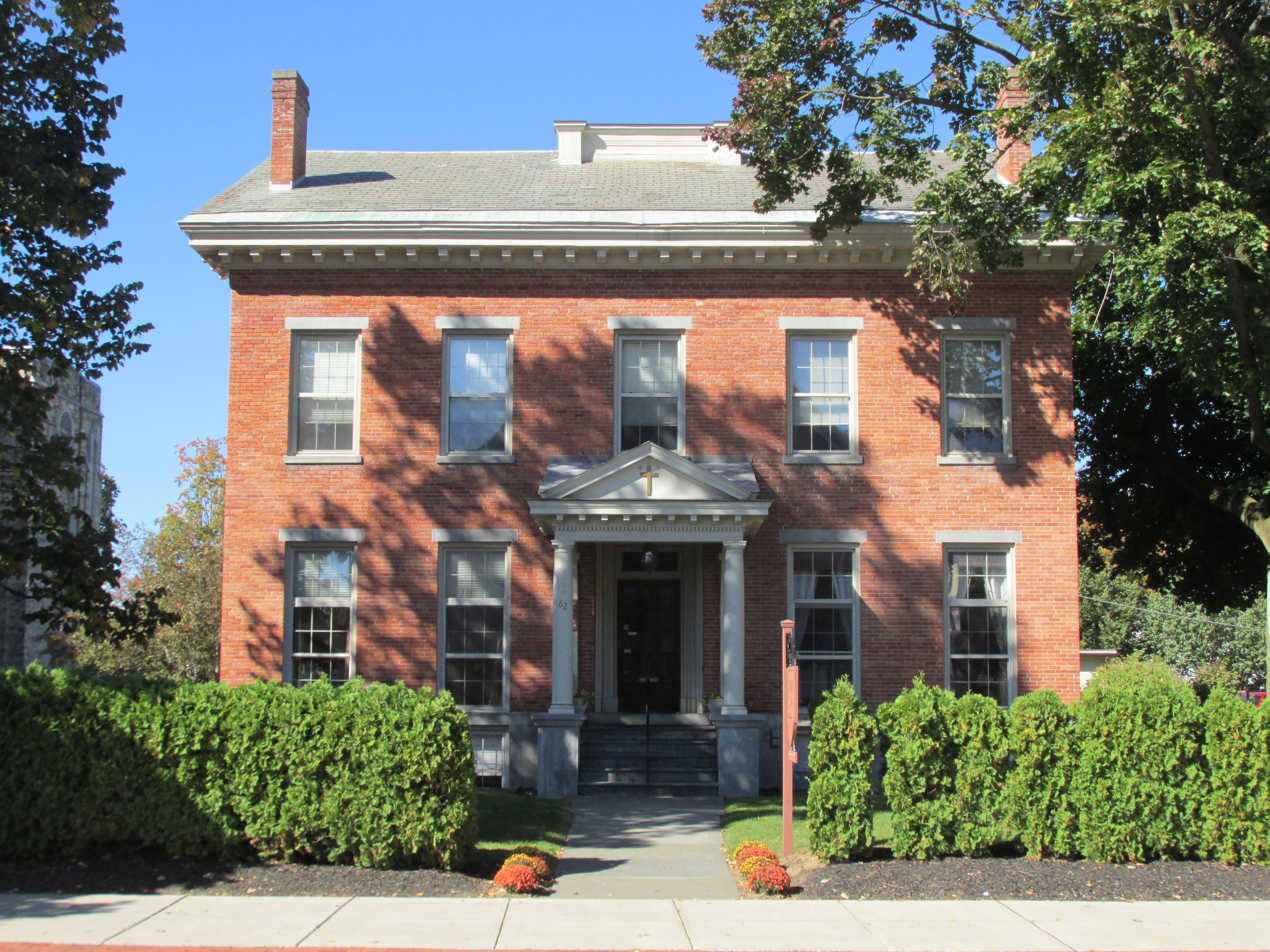
- Enoch Rosekrans House

- Location within New York Location within the United States
- Location: 62 Warren St., Glens Falls, New York
- Coordinates: 43°18′35″N 73°37′47″W
- Area: less than one acre
- Built: 1850
- Architect: Pike, Lindsey
- Architectural style: Greek Revival, Italianate
- MPS: Glens Falls MRA
- NRHP reference No.: 84003396
- Added to NRHP: September 29, 1984

Enoch Rosekrans House is a historic home located at Glens Falls, Warren County, New York. It was built about 1855 and is a rectangular 2 1/2-story brick residence that incorporates transitional vernacular Greek Revival / Italianate style design elements. It features a five-bay facade with central entrance sheltered by a portico with pediment and denticulated cornice.

It was added to the National Register of Historic Places in 1984.
