= Argent Apartments =

- U.S. National Register of Historic Places
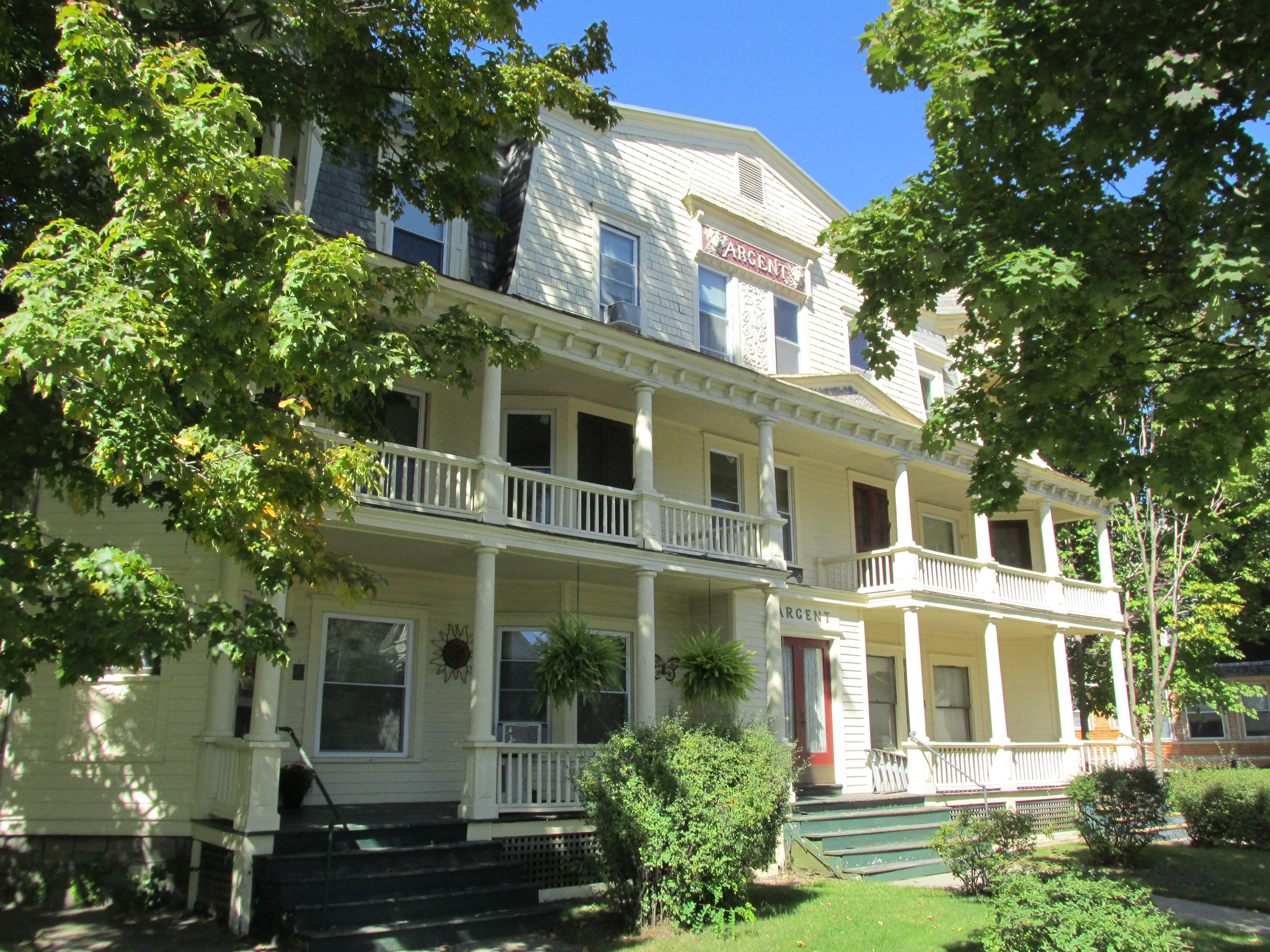
- Argent Apartments

- Location within New York Location within the United States
- Location: 17-18 Sherman Ave., Glens Falls, New York
- Coordinates: 43°18′40″N 73°38′23″W
- Area: less than one acre
- Built: 1895
- Architect: Lawrence, William E.; Acker, W. E. & Son
- Architectural style: Renaissance, Queen Anne
- MPS: Glens Falls MRA
- NRHP reference No.: 84003240
- Added to NRHP: September 29, 1984

Argent Apartments is a historic apartment house located at Glens Falls, Warren County, New York. It was built about 1895 and is a rectangular, three story, frame building covered by a slate mansard roof and clapboard sheathing. At the corners are three story towers with open galleries. It has two tiered porches with turned posts and balustrades.

It was added to the National Register of Historic Places in 1984.
