= James L. Dix House =

Historic house in New York, United States

- U.S. National Register of Historic Places
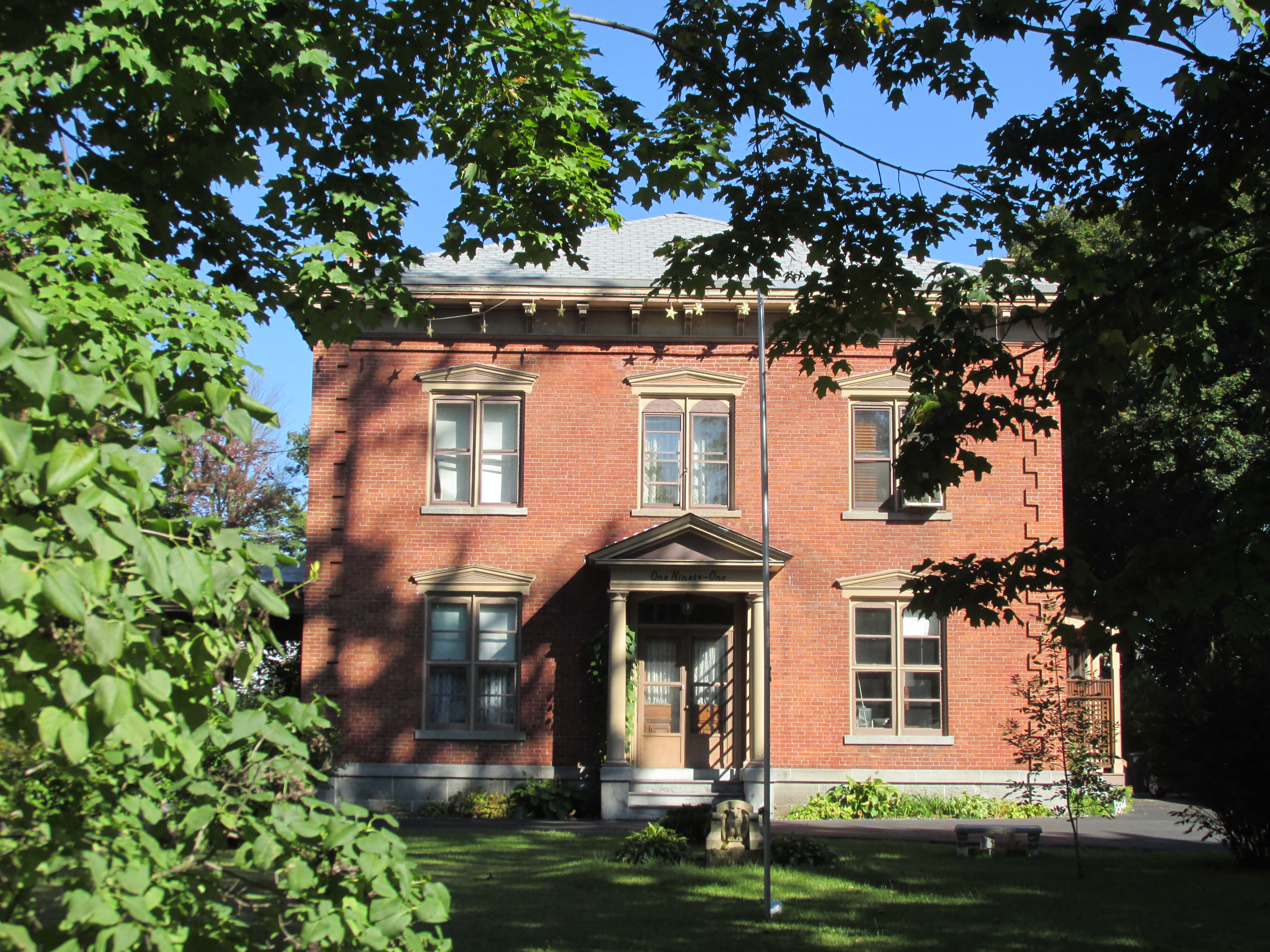
- James L. Dix House

- Location within New York Location within the United States
- Interactive map showing the location of the James L. Dix House
- Location: 191 Ridge St., Glens Falls, New York
- Coordinates: 43°19′3″N 73°37′52″W
- Area: less than one acre
- Built: 1866
- Architectural style: Colonial Revival, Italianate
- MPS: Glens Falls MRA
- NRHP reference No.: 84003268
- Added to NRHP: September 29, 1984

James L. Dix House is a historic home located at Glens Falls, Warren County, New York. It was built in 1866 and is a two-story, hip-roofed, brick vernacular residence with Italianate and Colonial Revival style design elements. It consists of a three-bay main block with a two-story, gable-roofed service wing.

It was added to the National Register of Historic Places in 1984.
