= House at 216 Warren Street =

Historic house in New York, United States

- U.S. National Register of Historic Places
- Location within New York Location within the United States
- Location: 216 Warren St., Glens Falls, New York
- Coordinates: 43°18′38″N 73°37′4″W
- Area: less than one acre
- Built: 1874
- Architectural style: Second Empire
- Demolished: sometime between June 2012 and October 2014
- MPS: Glens Falls MRA
- NRHP reference No.: 84003351
- Added to NRHP: September 29, 1984

House at 216 Warren Street was a historic home located at Glens Falls, Warren County, New York. It was built in 1874 and was an asymmetrical, two-story eclectic frame residence in the Second Empire style. It features a mansard roof and two-story corner tower.

It was added to the National Register of Historic Places in 1984.

The house was demolished sometime between June 2012 and October 2014 (based on Google Street Views).
