= Smith Flats =

- U.S. National Register of Historic Places
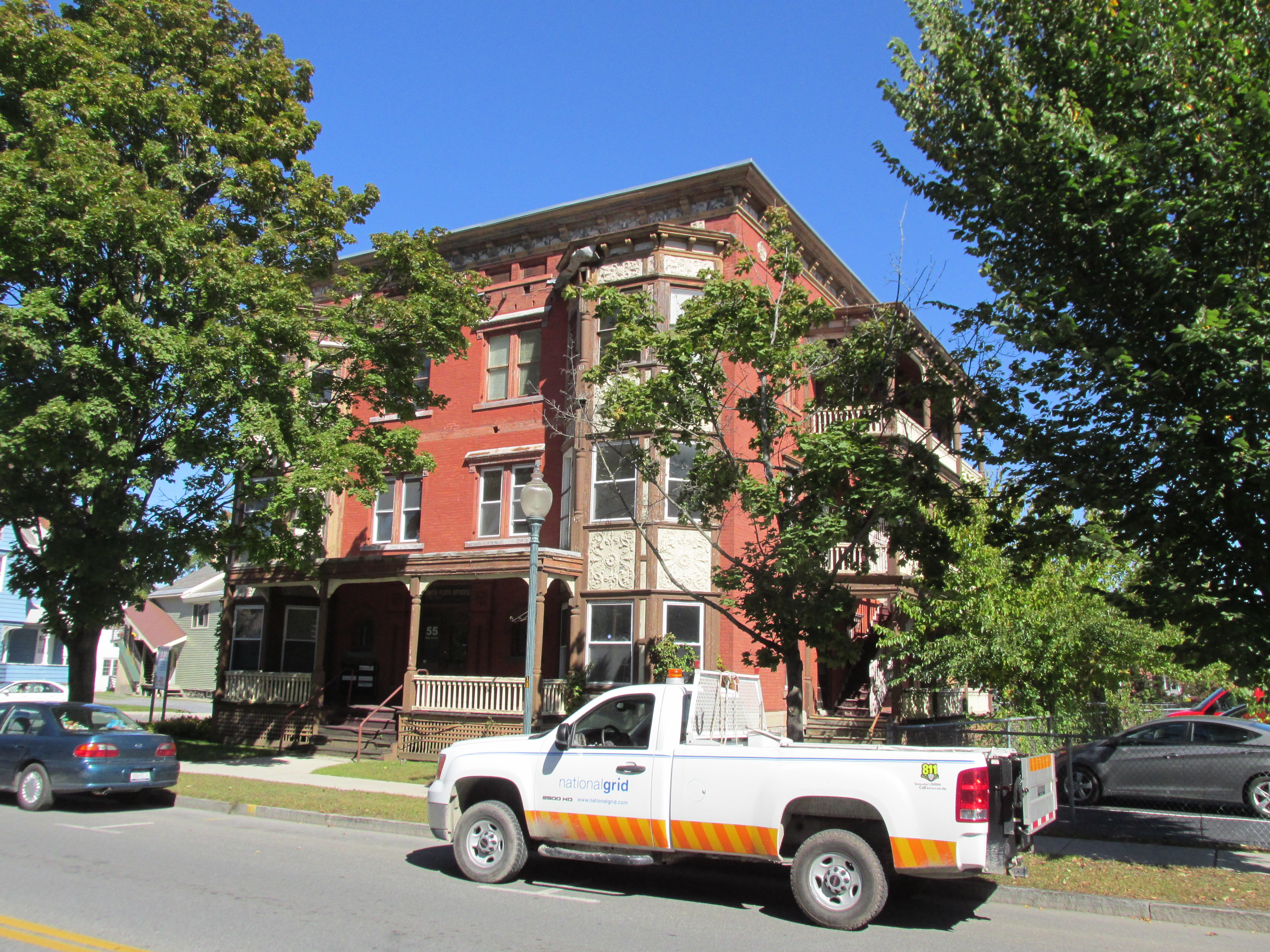
- Smith Flats

- Location within New York Location within the United States
- Location: 53-61 Bay St., Glens Falls, New York
- Coordinates: 43°18′45″N 73°38′49″W
- Area: less than one acre
- Built: 1895
- Architect: Lawrence, William E.; Shippey, Frank P.
- Architectural style: Renaissance, Queen Anne
- MPS: Glens Falls MRA
- NRHP reference No.: 84003404
- Added to NRHP: September 29, 1984

Smith Flats is a historic apartment house located at Glens Falls, Warren County, New York. It was built about 1895 and is a square, three story, flat roofed building faced with brick veneer. It features projecting three story bay windows, bracketed three tiered porches with turned posts and balustrades, and a bracketed pressed metal cornice.

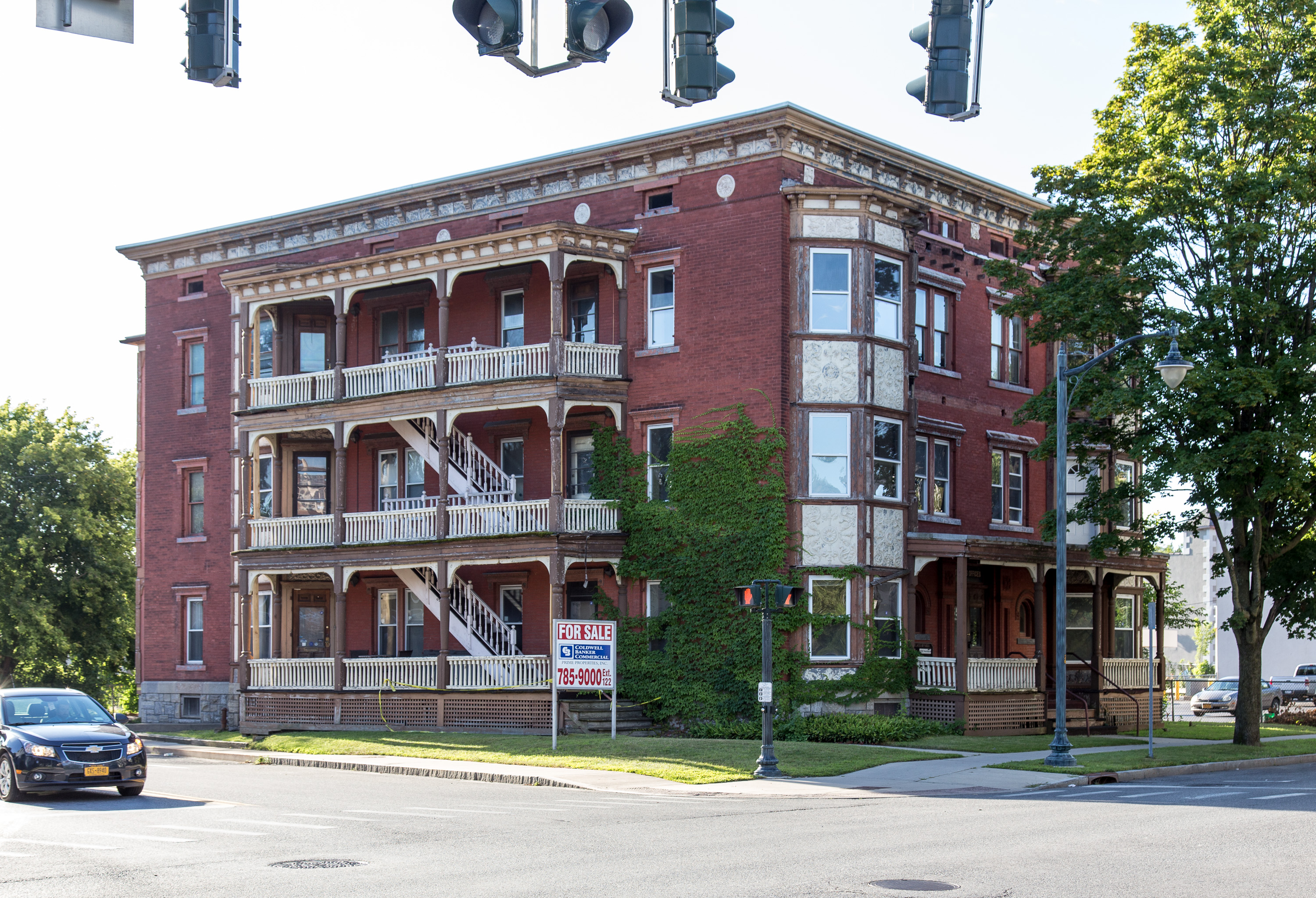
Smith Flats in 2015

It was added to the National Register of Historic Places in 1984.
