= William McEchron House =

Historic house in New York, United States

- U.S. National Register of Historic Places
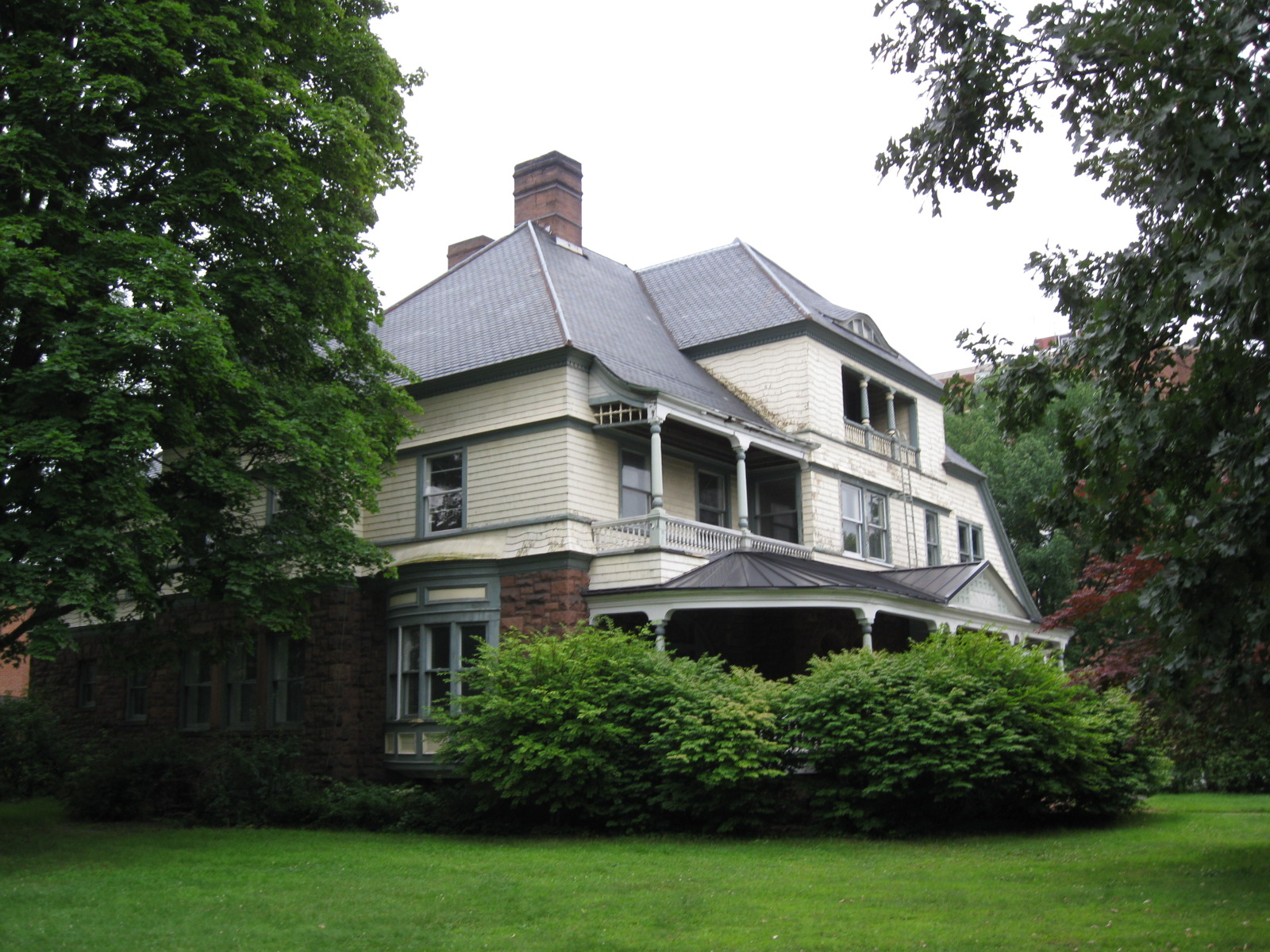
- William McEchron House, August 2009

- Location within New York Location within the United States
- Location: 65 Ridge St., Glens Falls, New York
- Coordinates: 43°18′39″N 73°37′53″W
- Area: less than one acre
- Built: 1891
- Architect: Thompson, A.W.
- Architectural style: Queen Anne, Romanesque
- MPS: Glens Falls MRA
- NRHP reference No.: 84003371
- Added to NRHP: September 29, 1984

William McEchron House is a historic home located at Glens Falls, Warren County, New York. It was built in 1891 and is a 2 1/2-story, asymmetrical stone-and-frame residence that incorporates elements of Queen Anne and Romanesque Revival design. The first story is built of rock-faced, random ashlar sandstone. It features a pair of stone arches at the entrance and a massive stone arch at the porte cochere.

It was added to the National Register of Historic Places in 1984.
