= Joseph J. Fredella House and Garage =

Historic house in New York, United States

- U.S. National Register of Historic Places
- Location within New York Location within the United States
- Location: 15-17 Mohican St., Glens Falls, New York
- Coordinates: 43°18′24″N 73°38′37″W
- Area: less than one acre
- Built: 1912
- Architect: Fredella, Joseph J.
- Demolished: before 2016
- MPS: Fredella Concrete Block Structures TR
- NRHP reference No.: 84003331
- Added to NRHP: September 29, 1984

Joseph J. Fredella House and Garage is a historic home and garage located at Glens Falls, Warren County, New York. They were built in 1912 and are constructed of concrete block. The house is an American Foursquare style, two-story concrete residence covered by a hipped roof covered in slate. The garage is a two-story, rectangular flat-roofed structure.

It was added to the National Register of Historic Places in 1984.

The building was demolished and a parking lot put in its place sometime before 2016.
