= Thomas Stilwell House =

Historic house in New York, United States

- U.S. National Register of Historic Places
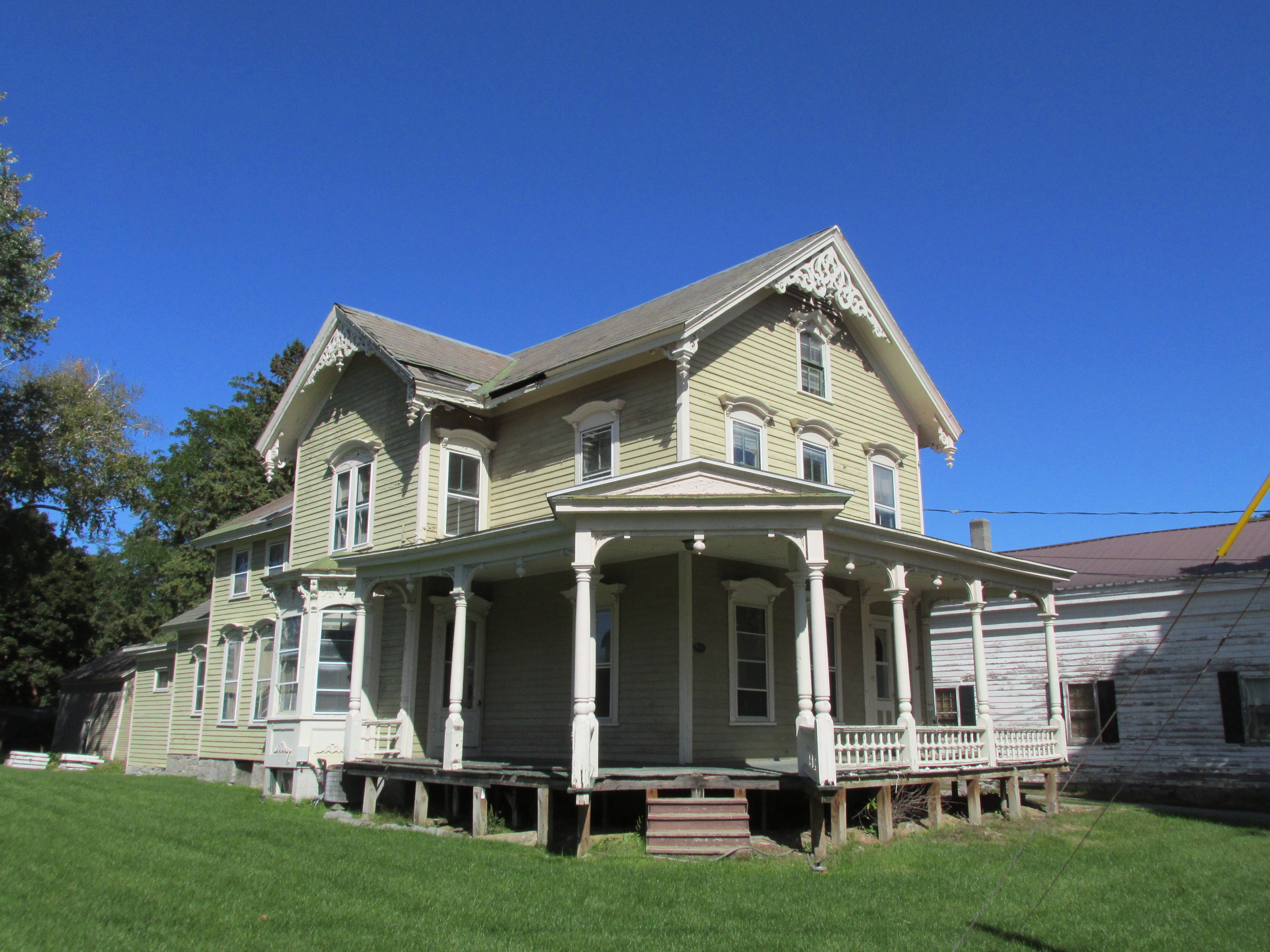
- Thomas Stilwell House

- Location within New York Location within the United States
- Location: 134 Maple St., Glens Falls, New York
- Coordinates: 43°18′41″N 73°38′28″W
- Area: less than one acre
- Built: 1875
- Architectural style: Stick/Eastlake, Italianate
- MPS: Glens Falls MRA
- NRHP reference No.: 84003414
- Added to NRHP: September 29, 1984

Thomas Stilwell House is a historic home located at Glens Falls, Warren County, New York. It was built about 1875 and is a rectangular, two and one half-story, frame residence with a gable roof and sheathed in clapboards. It features a raised, bracketed one-story porch with balustrade and ornate scroll-sawed fretwork. It is representative of a modest transitional Italianate – Eastlake style.

It was added to the National Register of Historic Places in 1984.
