= Fay (surname) =

Origin
- Origin: French, Irish
- Meaning: derived from the Old French "fage" or derived from Classical Irish "Ó Fathaigh" and "Ó Fiaich"
- Region of origin: Normandy, Ireland

Other names
- Variant forms: de Fay, du Fay, Fahey, Fahy, Faye, Fee, Foy, Fey, Fye.

Fay is an Irish surname that also arose independently in France. There are different theories about the origin and meaning of the surname.

== Origin ==
=== French / Norman ===
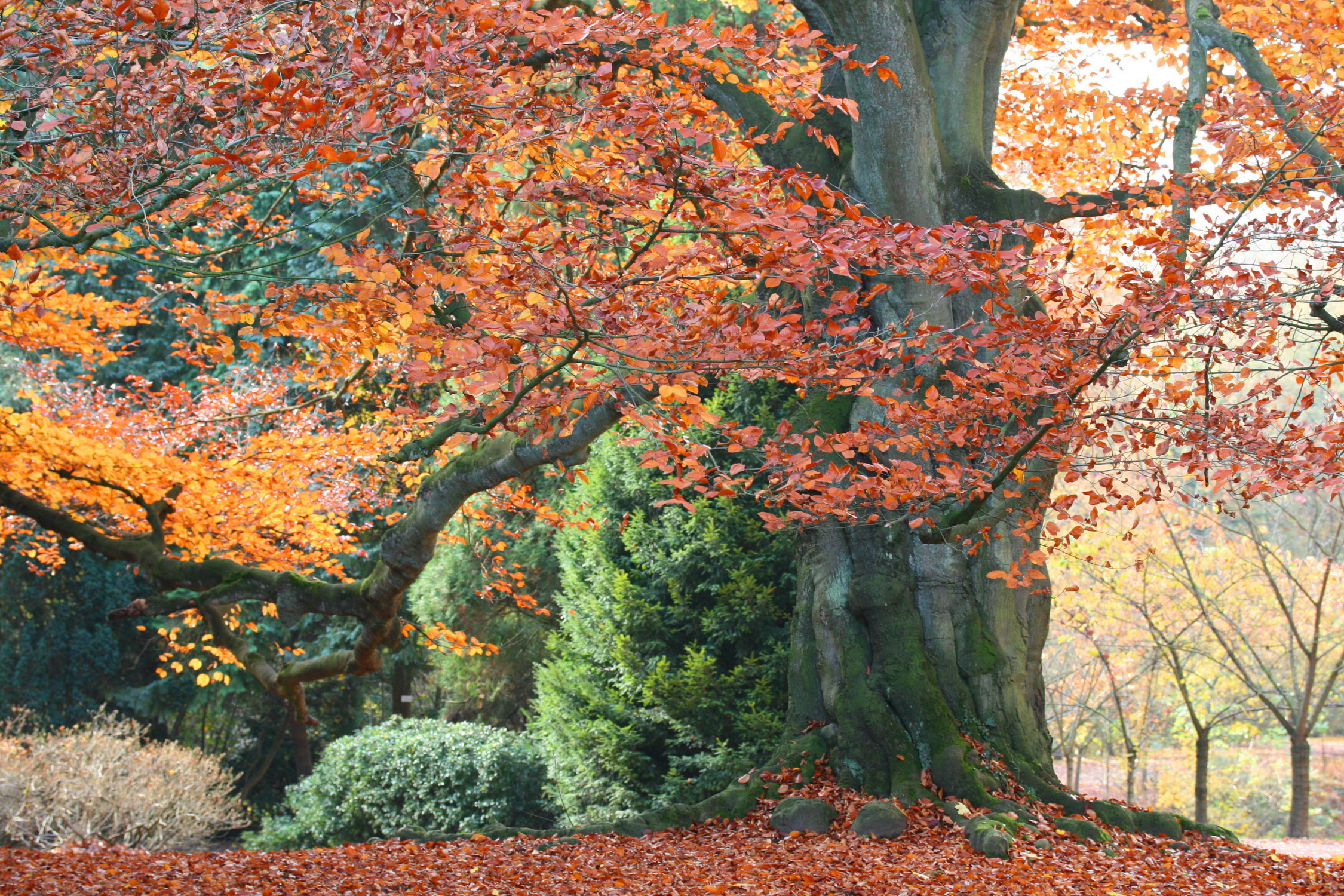
Old French "fage", meaning Beech

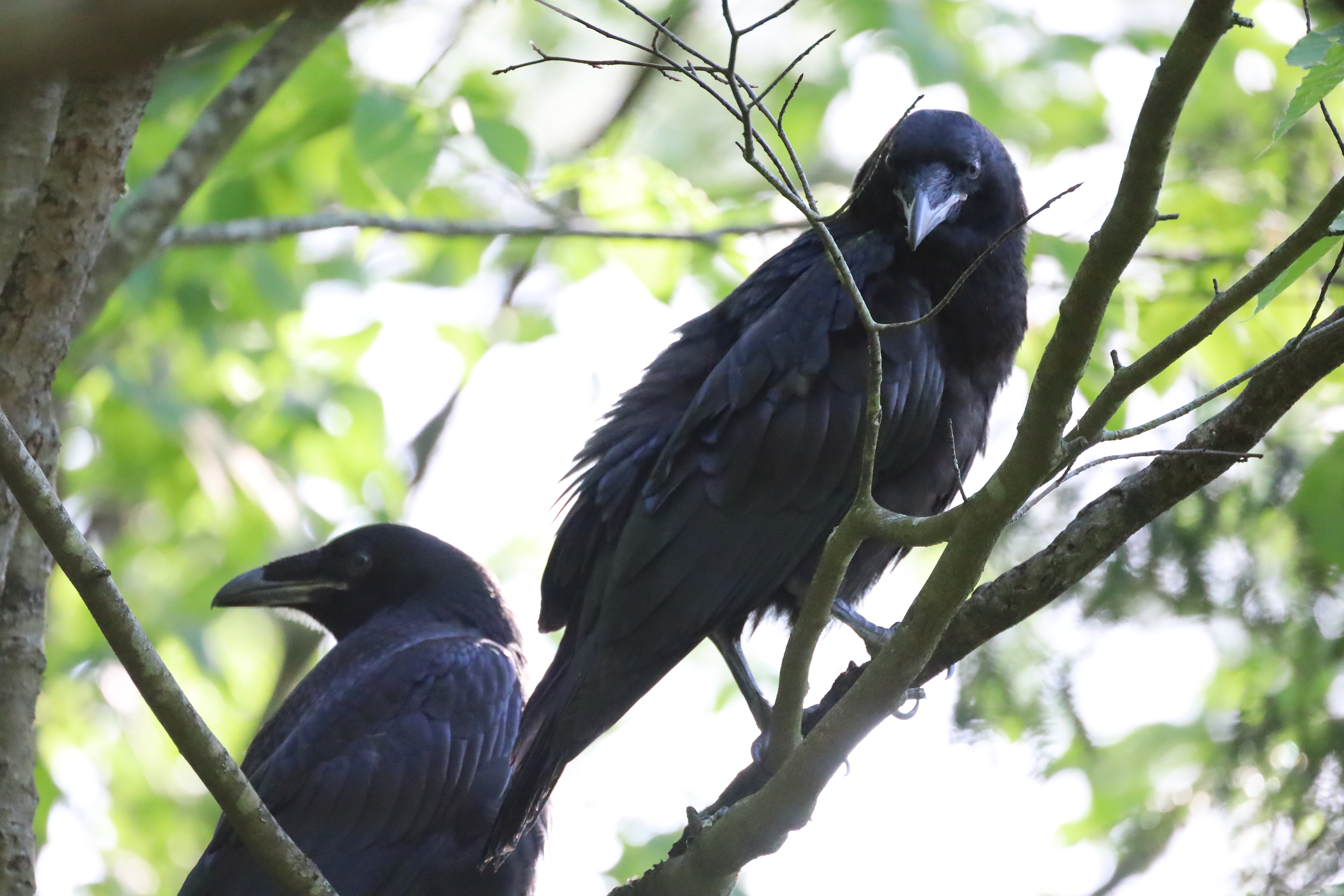
Classical Irish "Fiach" meaning Raven

The name may have originally derived from the Norman surname "de Fae", which has several possible origins. The first and oldest origin is locational, stemming from the Old French "fage", which is derived from the Latin "Fagus", referring to a "place of beech trees". Other claims are that Fae stems from the Old French "fae", meaning magical, enchanted, or otherworldly, or from the Anglo-French "fei" meaning faithfulness to a trust or promise; loyalty to a person; honesty, truthfulness. The name was introduced to England and Ireland in the 12th and 13th centuries through the Norman conquest and settlement of both regions.

The Viscounts De La Faye and Du Fai, from whom the later variants stem, originated in Sainte-Honorine-du-Fay in Normandy. The first recorded appearance of the name in England was Radulphus de Fae, who was granted a manor extension in Surrey by Henry II in 1154. The first appearance in Ireland was Richard de Fae, a knight who settled in the Lordship of Meath in 1219.

The Norman-derived variant of Fay is the most common origin of the name in Ireland, and is predominantly found in counties Westmeath, Cavan and Monaghan. However, the surname also arose independently in Ireland from the Anglicisation of two Gaelic surnames.

=== Irish ===
In Ireland, Fay may also represent Anglicised forms of the Gaelic surnames Ó Fiaich meaning 'descendant of Fiach' (a nickname meaning 'raven', but is sometimes mistranslated as 'Hunt' as a result of confusion with fiach, the modern spelling of fiadhach 'hunt') and Ó Fathaigh meaning 'descendant of Fathadh' (a personal name derived from fothadh 'base' or 'foundation', but is sometimes mistranslated as Green as a result of erroneous association with faithche 'lawn').

=== Other origins ===
The Serer surname Faye may also be spelled as Fay in Serer proper. It is unrelated to the Irish and French surname and pronounced differently.

== Notable people ==
Notable people with the surname include:

=== Performers ===
- Bill Fay (1943–2025), English singer-songwriter
- Dorothy Fay (1915–2003), American actress
- Faith Fay (born 1987), American actress
- Frank Fay (American actor) (1897–1961), American Vaudeville performer
- Frank Fay (Irish actor) (1870–1931), Irish co–founder of the Abbey Theatre
- Isabel Fay (born 1979), British actor
- Johnny Fay (born 1966), Canadian drummer
- Martin Fay (1938–2012), Irish fiddler
- Meagen Fay (fl. 1980s–2020s), American actress
- Rick Fay (1926–1999), American clarinetist
- William Fay (1872–1947), Irish actor

=== Politicians ===
- Charles Joseph Fay (c. 1842–1895), Irish politician
- Francis B. Fay (1793–1876), American politician
- Fred Fay (1944–2011), American disability rights activist
- James H. Fay (1899–1948), American lawyer
- Jessica Fay, American politician
- John Fay (1773–1855), American politician
- Paul B. Fay (1918–2009), United States Secretary of the Navy
- Peter T. Fay (1929–2021), American lawyer and judge
- William M. Fay (1915–2000), judge of the United States Tax Court

=== Others ===
- Brian Fay (born 1943), American philosopher
- Charles Ernest Fay (1846–1931), American mountain climber
- Daisy Fay maiden name of Daisy Buchanan in F. Scott Fitzgerald's The Great Gatsby
- Darren Fay (born 1976), Irish footballer
- Gemma Fay (born 1981), Scottish footballer
- George Fay, United States Army general
- J. Michael Fay (born 1956), American ecologist
- James Bernard Fay (born 1947), Canadian farmer
- John Fay (born 1964), British television writer
- John D. Fay (1815–1895), American civil engineer
- Kate Fay, New Zealand chef and food writer based in Auckland
- Larry Fay (1888–1933), American businessperson
- Lydia Mary Fay (1804–1878), American missionary, educator, writer, and translator
- Marianne Fay, American economist and writer
- Marion Spencer Fay (1896–1990), American physician and academic administrator
- Maura Fay (1958–2001), Australian television producer
- Michael Fay (born 1947), New Zealand businessperson
- Michael Fay (born 1975), American vandal caned in Singapore
- Michael D. Fay, American war and combat artist
- Michael Francis Fay (born 1960), British Botanist and Geneticist
- Michael P. Fay (born 1975), American–Singaporean vandal
- Ming Fay, American sculptor
- Peter W. Fay (1924–2004), American historian
- Randy Fay, American software developer
- Sam Fay (1856–1953), English railwayman
- Sidney Bradshaw Fay (1876–1967), American historian
- Sarah Corinne Fay (born 1984), TV Producer

== See also ==
- de Fay
- de la Fay
- du Fay
- Fahey
- Faye (surname)
- Faye family
