= Warrensburg =

Warrensburg is the name of some places in the United States:

- Warrensburg, Illinois
- Warrensburg, Missouri
- Warrensburg (town), New York
  - Warrensburg (CDP), New York
