= De Fay =

de Fay is a French surname. Notable people with the surname include:

- Charles César de Fay de La Tour-Maubourg (1757–1831), French soldier
- Juste-Charles de Fay de La Tour-Maubourg (1774–1824), French marquess
- Marie Victor de Fay, marquis de Latour-Maubourg (1768–1850), French cavalry commander
