= Warrensburg (CDP), New York =

Warrensburg
- CDP
- Location within the state of New York
- Coordinates: 43°30′N 73°46′W
- Country: United States
- State: New York
- County: Warren
- Town: Warrensburg

Area
  - Total: 6.96 sq mi (18.02 km^{2})
  - Land: 6.76 sq mi (17.50 km^{2})
  - Water: 0.20 sq mi (0.53 km^{2})
- Elevation: 745 ft (227 m)

Population (2020)
  - Total: 3,045
  - Density: 450.7/sq mi (174.03/km^{2})
- Time zone: UTC-5 (Eastern (EST))
  - Summer (DST): UTC-4 (EDT)
- ZIP code: 12885
- Area code: 518
- FIPS code: 36-78289
- GNIS feature ID: 0968825

Warrensburg is a census-designated place (CDP) in Warren County, New York, United States. The population was 3,045 at the 2020 census. It is part of the Glens Falls Metropolitan Statistical Area.

Warrensburg is located on U.S. Route 9, on the Schroon River, east of the Hudson River, and west of Interstate 87 (The Northway). The CDP is entirely within the town of Warrensburg.

According to the 2000 United States census, the CDP comprises less than one-fifth of the town's total area, yet has about 75% of the town's population. The CDP's population density is more than fourteen times that of the town outside the CDP. Much of the town's historic core is within the Hamlet of Warrensburgh Historic District, listed on the National Register of Historic Places in 2001. Also listed on the National Register of Historic Places are the Merrill MaGee House, Mixter Blacksmith Shop, and Warrensburg Mills Historic District.

== Geography ==
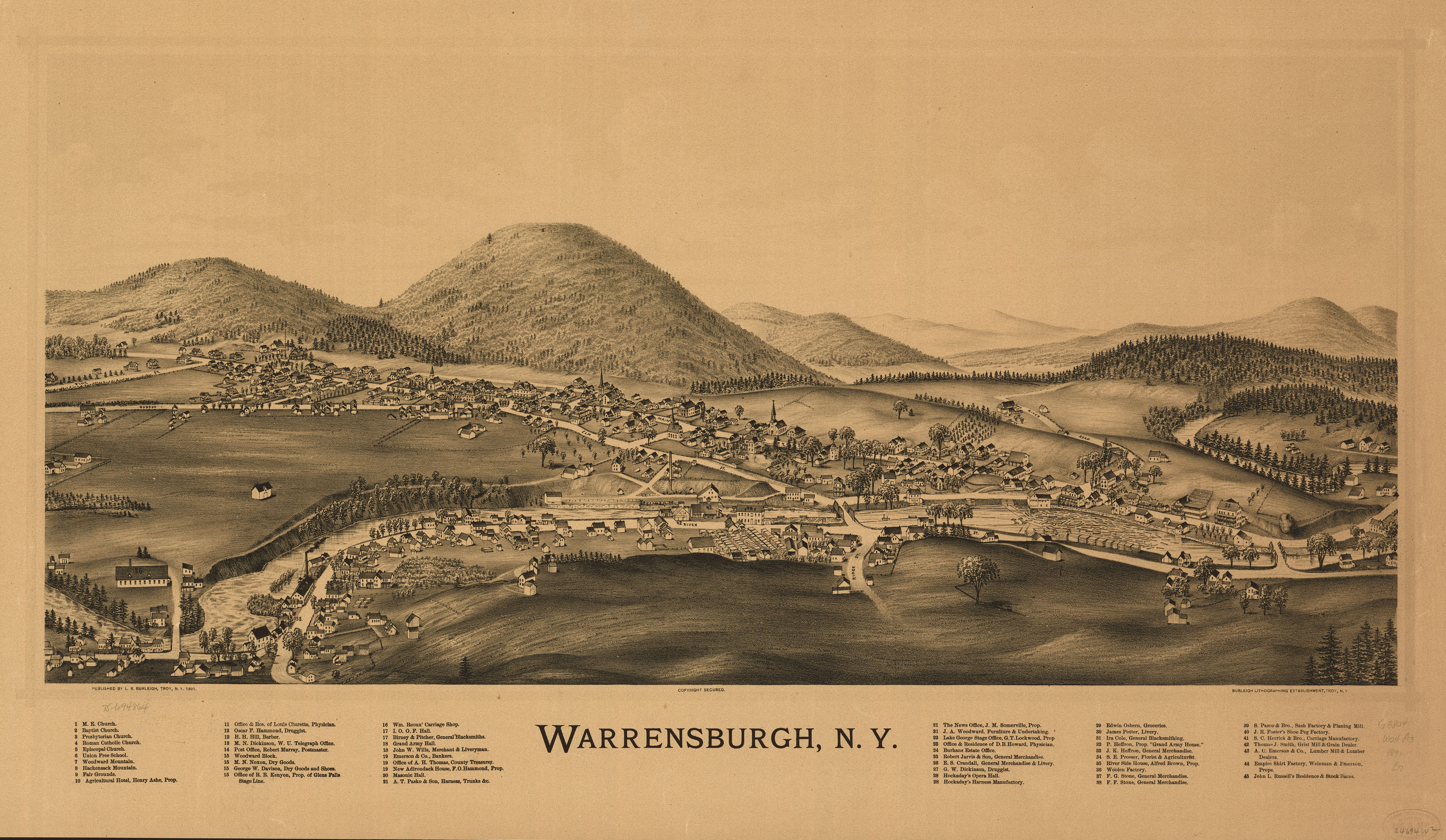
Lithograph of Warrensburgh published by L.R. Burleigh 1891 with list of landmarks

According to the United States Census Bureau, the CDP has a total area of 11.3 square miles (29.2 km^{2}), of which 11.1 square miles (28.7 km^{2}) is land and 0.2 square mile (0.5 km^{2}) (1.86%) is water.

Warrensburg is located west of Lake George and is entirely inside the Adirondack Park.

== Demographics ==
Historical population
Census	Pop.	Note	%±
2020	3,045		—
U.S. Decennial Census

As of the census of 2000, there were 3,208 people, 1,297 households, and 865 families residing in the CDP. The population density was 289.4 inhabitants per square mile (111.7/km^{2}). There were 1,453 housing units at an average density of 131.1 per square mile (50.6/km^{2}). The racial makeup of the CDP was 98.38% White, 0.12% Black or African American, 0.09% Native American, 0.44% Asian, 0.09% from other races, and 0.87% from two or more races. Hispanic or Latino of any race were 0.50% of the population.

There were 1,297 households, out of which 32.9% had children under the age of 18 living with them, 47.1% were married couples living together, 15.0% had a female householder with no husband present, and 33.3% were non-families. 26.8% of all households were made up of individuals, and 11.6% had someone living alone who was 65 years of age or older. The average household size was 2.42 and the average family size was 2.90.

In the CDP, the population was spread out, with 25.0% under the age of 18, 7.2% from 18 to 24, 27.4% from 25 to 44, 25.7% from 45 to 64, and 14.6% who were 65 years of age or older. The median age was 39 years. For every 100 females, there were 88.4 males. For every 100 females age 18 and over, there were 82.5 males.

The median income for a household in the CDP was $27,372, and the median income for a family was $32,689. Males had a median income of $31,322 versus $20,833 for females. The per capita income for the CDP was $15,585. About 14.1% of families and 17.7% of the population were below the poverty line, including 27.1% of those under age 18 and 6.7% of those age 65 or over.

== Transportation ==
Warrensburg is a flag stop for Trailways of New York between New York City and Montreal.
