= Ó Fathaigh =

O'Fahey (Irish: Ó Fathaigh) is an anglicised form of Ó Fathaigh. The patronym means "descendant of Fathach", whose name means "base" or "foundation". Cormac Ó Fathaigh is the first recorded bearer with the surname and is the purported ancestor of any Ó Fathaigh descendants. The surname largely became Fahey, with many variations.

== Notable descendants ==
- Pádraig Ó Fathaigh (1879–1976), Irish Republican Army intelligence officer

== See also ==
Anglicised versions of the surname:

- Fahey
- Fahie
- Fahy (surname)
- Fay (surname)
