= Fee (surname) =

Fee is a surname, usually an anglicized version of the Irish Ó Fiaich. The Chinese surname Fei is sometimes also transliterated as Fee. The French surname Fée, meaning fairy, is another less common source for this name in English.

Notable people with the surname include:

- Albert Fee (1880–1957), Canadian provincial politician
- Ben Fee (1908–1978), Chinese American writer and labor organizer
- Christopher R. Fee, American medievalist
- Douglas Fee (born 1944), Canadian politician and businessman
- Earl Fee (born 1929), Canadian track and field athlete
- Francis Fee (born 1934), former Irish cricketer
- Fra Fee (born 1987), Northern Irish actor
- Gordon Fee (1934–2022), American-Canadian theologian
- Greg Fee (born 1964), former English footballer
- Jack Fee (1867–1913), American baseball player
- James Fee (1949–2006), American photographer
- James Alger Fee (1888–1959), US federal judge
- John Fee (politician) (1963–2007), Irish nationalist politician
- John Gregg Fee (1816–1901), American minister, abolitionist, and educator
- Jordan Fee, American college basketball coach
- Margery Fee, Canadian academic and linguist
- Mary Fee (born 1954), Scottish politician
- Melinda O. Fee (1942–2020), American actress
- Michale Fee (born 1964), American scientist
- Raymond Fee (1903–1983), American boxer
- Thomas Fee (1931–2013), American politician
- Thomas Arthur Fee (1860-1929), Canadian architect, partner in Parr and Fee
- Iain Fee (born 1973), UK Radio Broadcaster on Jack Radio
- Steve Fee (born 1975), American Music Producer and Lead Singer of the band “Fee”

== See also ==
- Fay (surname)
- Feely
- McFee
- Feehan (name)
