= Fahie =

Fahie (normally /fɔɪ/) is a surname derived from the Irish surname Ó Fathaigh. Alternative derivations include Fahey, Fahy and Fay. People named Fahie include:

- Andrew Fahie (born 1970), Premier of the British Virgin Islands
- Pauline Fahie (1910–1947), British writer and pilot
- Sir William Charles Fahie (1763 – 11 January 1833), Royal Naval officer
