= Hamlet of Warrensburgh Historic District =

Historic district in New York, United States

- U.S. National Register of Historic Places
- U.S. Historic district
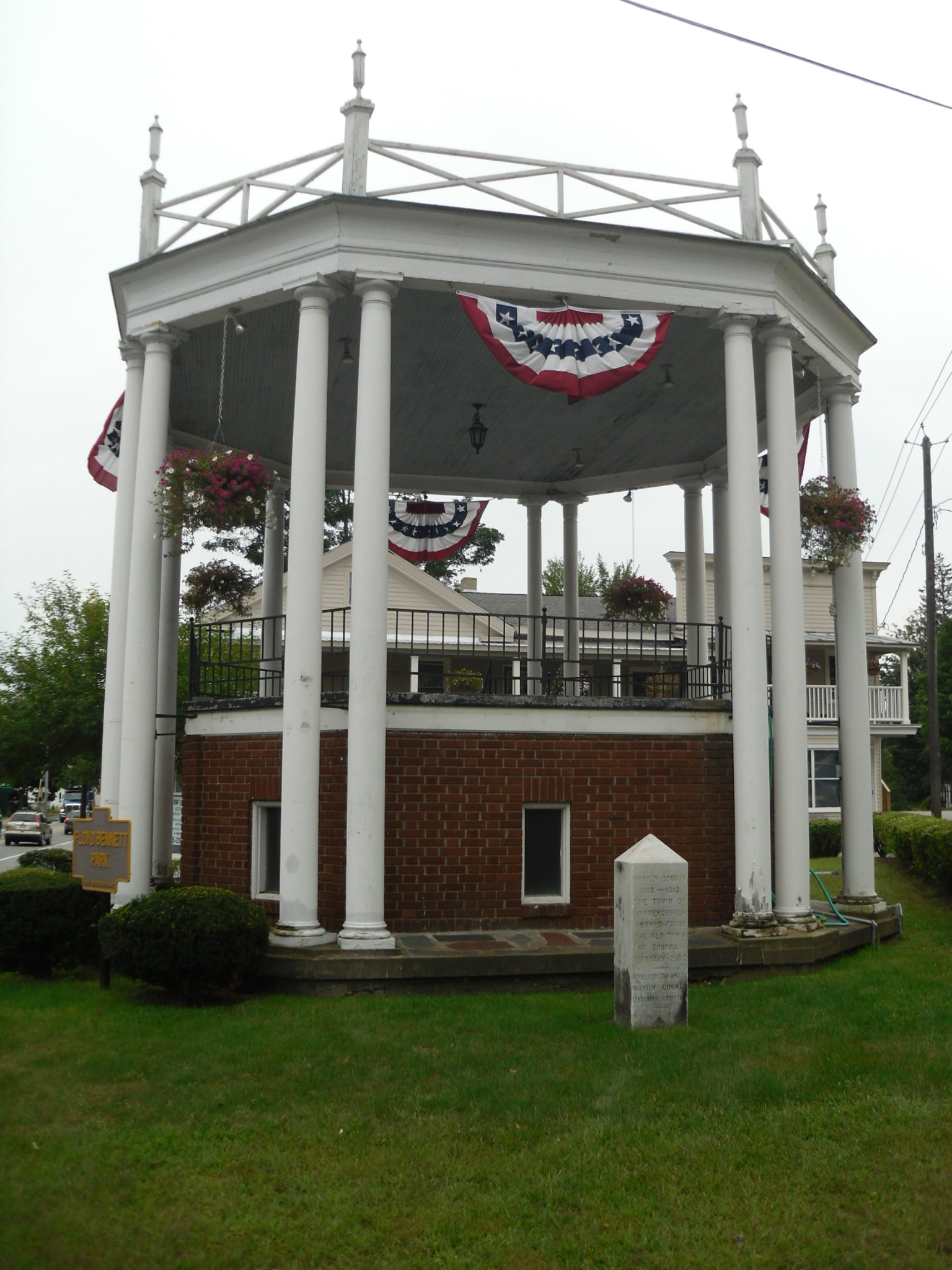
- Floyd Bennett Park Bandstand, August 2010

- Location within New York Location within the United States
- Location: Roughly along Schroon River and the Camp Echo Lake, Warrenburgh, New York
- Coordinates: 43°29′37″N 73°47′6″W
- Area: 275.5 acres (111.5 ha)
- Architectural style: Greek Revival, Queen Anne
- MPS: Warrensburgh, New York MPS
- NRHP reference No.: 01000292
- Added to NRHP: May 14, 2001

Hamlet of Warrensburgh Historic District is a national historic district located at Warrensburg, Warren County, New York. It includes 351 contributing buildings, three contributing sites, and five contributing structures. It encompasses the historic commercial core on the north side of the Schroon River and historic industrial core on the south side of the river of the hamlet of Warrensburgh. It includes more high styled residences and notable civic and religious properties on the north side and vernacular residences on the south side. Notable commercial buildings include the Woodward Block (ca. 1860), Wills Block (ca. 1865), bank building at 138 Main Street (ca. 1927), and the former Sturdevan's Bakery (ca. 1840). Three historic churches within the district are the Church of the Holy Cross (1864), First Methodist Church (1904), and United Presbyterian Church (1840). Civic buildings located within the district are the Richards Library (1900) and Warrensburgh Central School (1942). In addition, the Floyd Bennett Park and Bandstand (1930–31), named for Warrensburg native Floyd Bennett, is within the district.

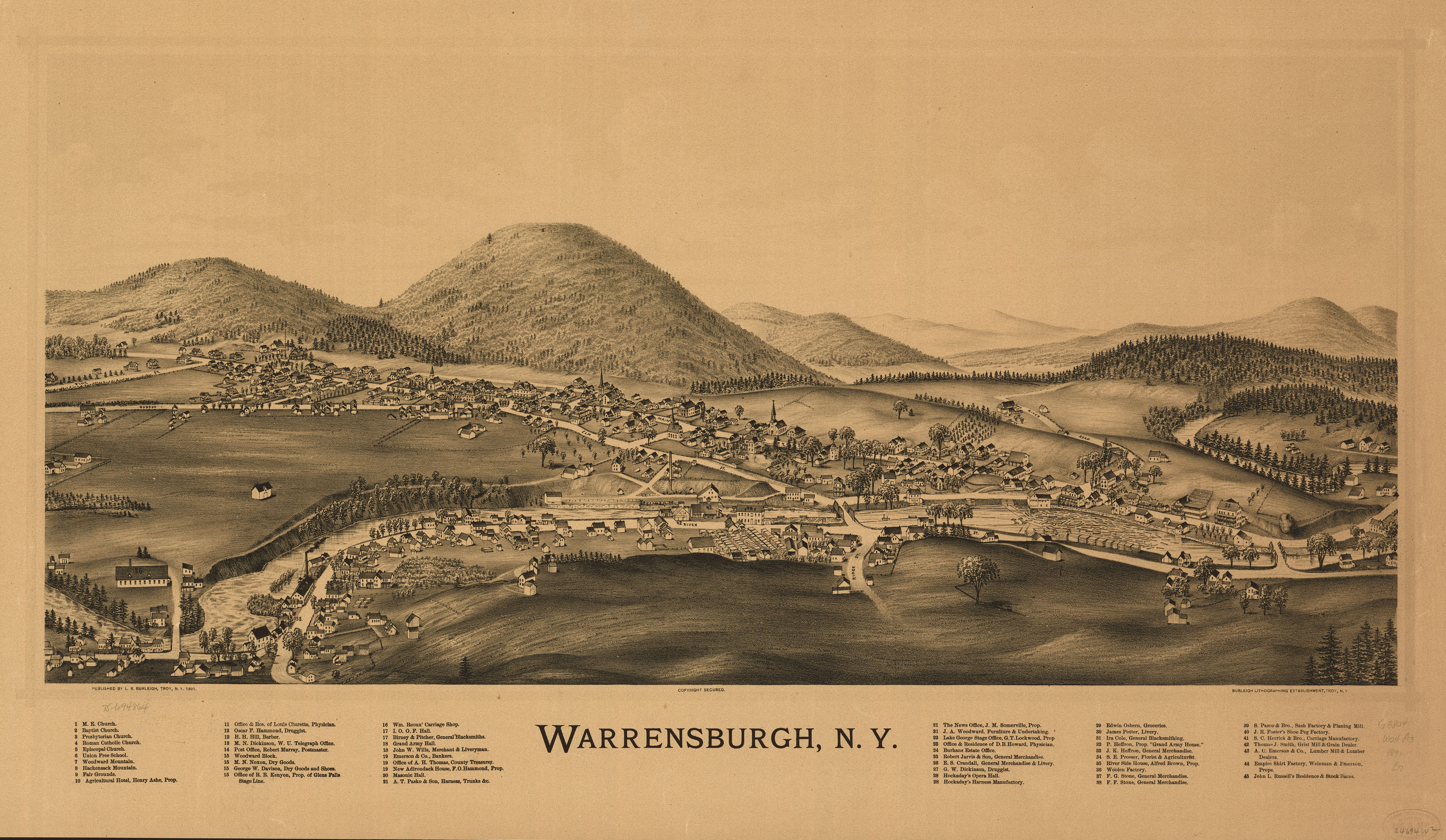
Lithograph of Warrensburgh published by L.R. Burleigh 1891 with list of landmarks

The St. Cecelia's Cemetery and Warrensburgh Cemetery are also within the district boundaries. Located within the district is the separately listed Merrill MaGee House and Warrensburg Mills Historic District.

It was added to the National Register of Historic Places in 2001.
