= Warrensburg, New York =

Warrensburg
- Town
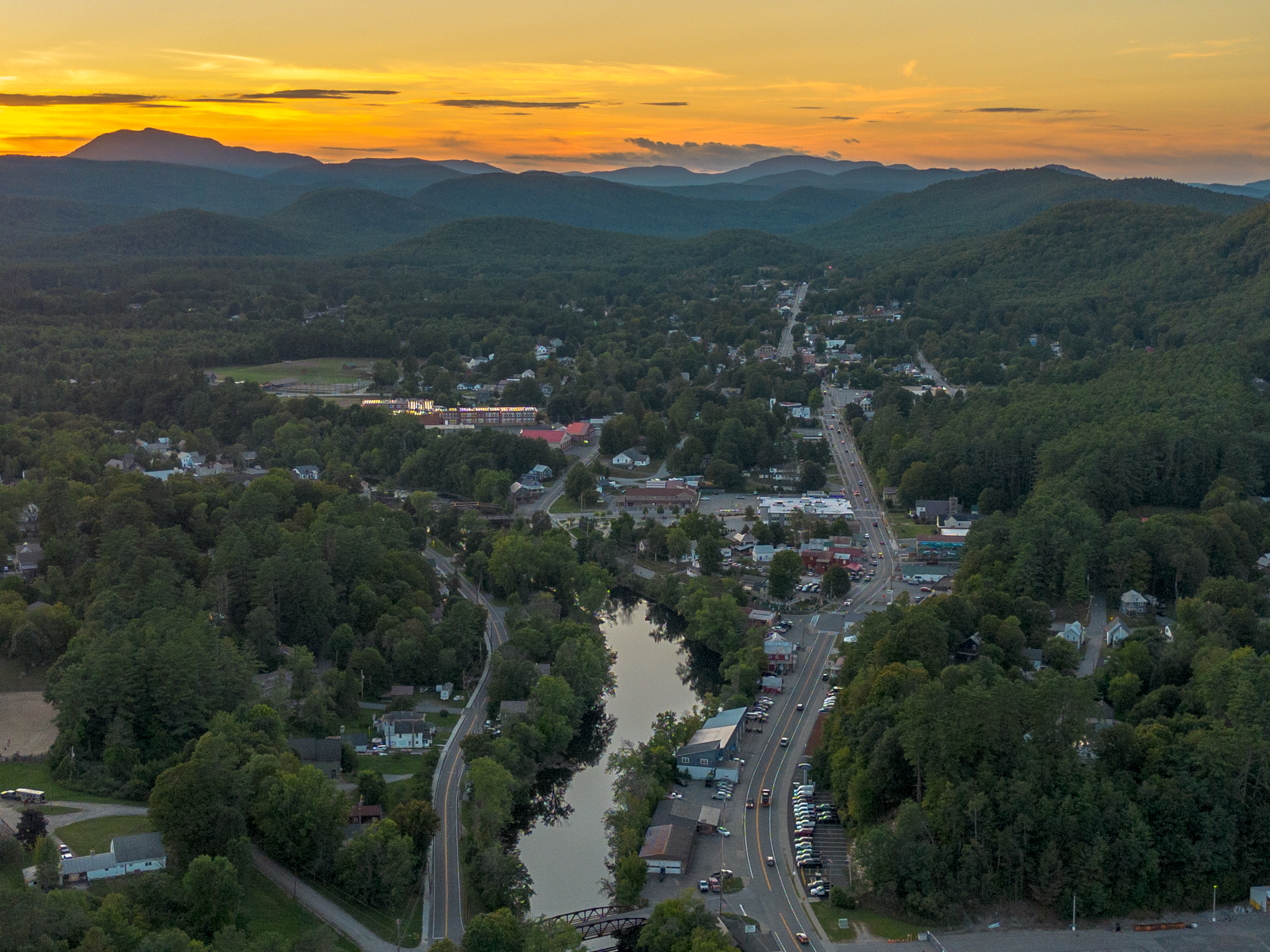
- Warrensburg in 2025

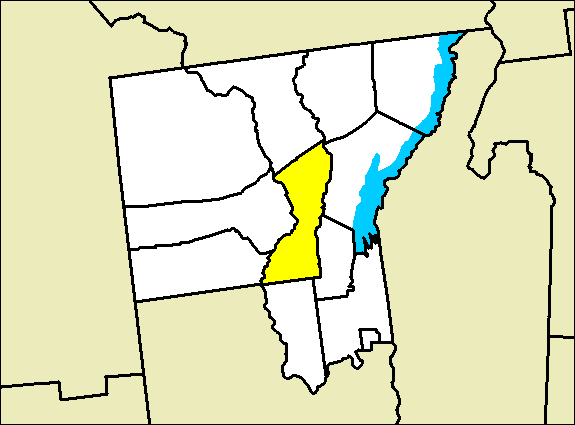
- Location of Warrensburg in Warren County

- Location of Warrensburg in New York
- Coordinates: 43°29′48″N 73°46′30″W
- Country: United States
- State: New York
- County: Warren
- Established: 1813

Government
  - Supervisor: Kevin B. Geraghty

Area
  - Total: 64.80 sq mi (167.83 km^{2})
  - Land: 63.49 sq mi (164.43 km^{2})
  - Water: 1.31 sq mi (3.40 km^{2})

Population (2020)
  - Total: 3,959
  - Density: 62.36/sq mi (24.08/km^{2})
- Time zone: UTC-5 (EST)
  - Summer (DST): UTC-4 (DST)
- ZIP code(s): 12885
- Area code: 518
- FIPS code: 36-113-78300
- Website: www.townofwarrensburg.org

Warrensburg is a town in Warren County, New York, United States. It is centrally located in the county, west of Lake George. It is part of the Glens Falls metropolitan area. The town population was 3,959 at the 2020 census. While the county is named after General Joseph Warren, the town is named after James Warren, a prominent early settler. U.S. Route 9 passes through the town, which is immediately west of Interstate 87 (the Northway).

According to the 2000 United States census, the town's main hamlet, also recognized by the U.S. Census Bureau as a census-designated place (CDP), constitutes less than one-fifth of the town's total area, yet has about 75% of the town's population. The Warrensburg CDP's population density is more than fourteen times that of the town outside the CDP. The CDP is entirely within the town of Warrensburg with much of the town's historic core including the Hamlet of Warrensburgh Historic District Merrill MaGee House, Mixter Blacksmith Shop, and Warrensburg Mills Historic District.

== History ==
Warrensburg was first settled by westerners in 1786 when William Bond established residency nearby what is today known as Echo Lake. Because there have been limited archeological digs, it is not precisely known what pre-western peoples lived in what is now Warrensburg. But, it is known that the peoples of the Six Nations were economically and politically active in the surrounding areas during the seventeenth and eighteenth centuries.

On April 4, 1813, community leaders held their first town meeting in a private home and elected the town's first supervisor, James L. Thurman, and several other officials and town workers. Prior to the formal establishment of the town, the settlement was referred to as "The Bridge" because of the settlement's proximity to a bridge over the Schroon River.

Although it is locally claimed that James Fenimore Cooper wrote The Last of the Mohicans in a second-story storefront apartment along what is now Main Street, it is more likely that Cooper had merely visited the town for a short time when working on the novel.

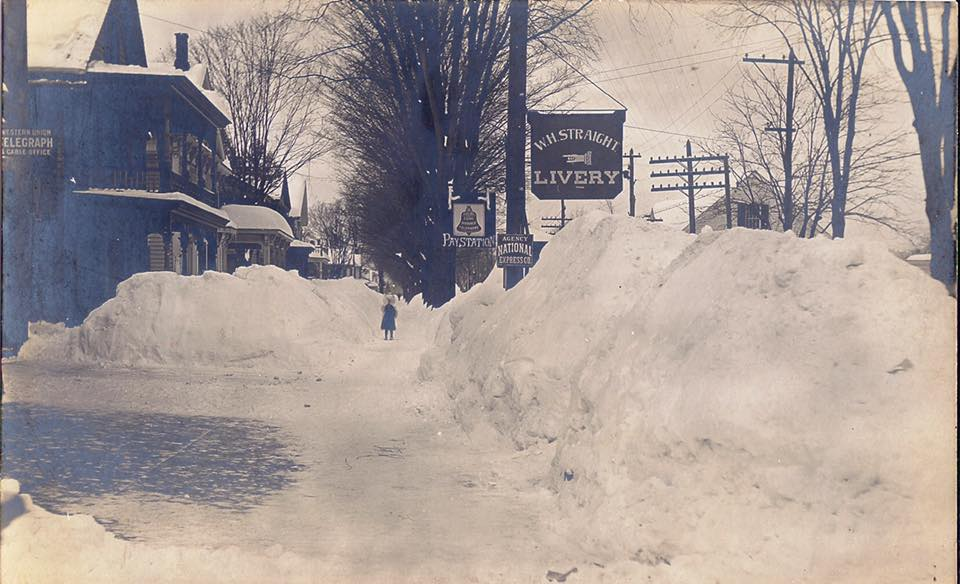
On March 11, 1888, a blizzard began that caused a 4-foot snowfall over three days.

In 1894, following the New York State Constitutional Convention, the town was expressly included in Article 7 (today Article 14) as being within the newly created Adirondack Park, making the town part of the state forest preserve that is to be kept forever wild.

Starting on June 16, 1961, twenty-nine employees of the Warrensburg Board & Paper Corporation voted 15–14 to join the United Paper Makers and Paper Workers AFL-CIO. Within a week of the vote, the Corporation reported irregularities to the National Labor Relations Board in an attempt to prevent unionization. In December of that year, the Union and Company entered into a series of negotiations through which the Union succeeded in most of its major demands, gaining agreement to an employee insurance plan, a Union bulletin board, free access to the mill to contact employees, grievance discussion rights, and wage increases. When the Union failed to agree upon what steps to take next, the Corporation claimed the disagreement among members was in-fact a rejection of the Union, and the Corporation refused to agree to a long-term contract with the Union. When the NLRB ordered the corporation to return to the negotiation table, the corporation was sued by the NLRB and compelled by the court to return to negotiations. On July 14, 1974, the paper mill operated by the corporation was partially destroyed by fire.

On April 3, 1976, flooding of the Schroon River, brought on by spring thaws, started to peak. The next day, the reservoir of the dam had raised so high as to completely surround the paper mill with water and cause outbuildings, train tracks, and pollution to be disturbed. Route 418, which runs parallel to the river, and a bridge located about a quarter of a mile upstream of the dam were shut down. The afternoon of April 4, under the direction of the New York Department of Environmental Conservation, two mill employees, using a backhoe and bulldozer owned by one of said employees, and aided by several private individuals, dug a ditch in approximately two and one-half hours, to alleviate the up-river flooding. Consequently, there was serious land erosion to the property adjacent to the dam and, the next spring, serious deposits of silt from the erosion was washed onto the Sit'N Bull Ranch and 1000 Acres Ranch, both located downstream.

Since 1979, the Warrensburg Chamber of Commerce has been hosting an annual event known as the "World's Largest Garage Sale." During this event, residents and vendors sell their wares in a town-wide garage sale.

== Geography ==
According to the United States Census Bureau, the town has a total area of 64.8 square miles (168 km^{2}), of which, 63.7 square miles (165 km^{2}) of it is land and 1.1 square miles (2.8 km^{2}) of it (1.74%) is water.

The west town line is the Hudson River. The Schroon River empties into the Hudson by the west town line.

== Demographics ==
Historical population
Census	Pop.	Note	%±
1820	956		—
1830	1,191		24.6%
1840	1,468		23.3%
1850	1,874		27.7%
1860	1,704		−9.1%
1870	1,579		−7.3%
1880	1,725		9.2%
1890	1,795		4.1%
1900	2,352		31.0%
1910	2,385		1.4%
1920	2,025		−15.1%
1930	2,263		11.8%
1940	2,566		13.4%
1950	2,894		12.8%
1960	2,907		0.4%
1970	3,330		14.6%
1980	3,810		14.4%
1990	4,174		9.6%
2000	4,255		1.9%
2010	4,094		−3.8%
2020	3,959		−3.3%
U.S. Decennial Census

As of the census of 2000, there were 4,255 people, 1,718 households, and 1,166 families residing in the town. The population density was 66.8 people per square mile (25.8 people/km^{2}). There were 2,148 housing units at an average density of 33.7 per square mile (13.0/km^{2}). The racial makeup of the town was 98.14% White, 0.16% Black or African American, 0.26% Native American, 0.49% Asian, 0.07% from other races, and 0.87% from two or more races. Hispanic or Latino of any race were 0.47% of the population.

There were 1,718 households, out of which 32.8% had children under the age of 18 living with them, 49.1% were married couples living together, 13.9% had a female householder with no husband present, and 32.1% were non-families. 25.3% of all households were made up of individuals, and 10.3% had someone living alone who was 65 years of age or older. The average household size was 2.44 and the average family size was 2.89.

In the town, the population was spread out, with 24.9% under the age of 18, 7.1% from 18 to 24, 28.4% from 25 to 44, 26.0% from 45 to 64, and 13.7% who were 65 years of age or older. The median age was 38 years. For every 100 females, there were 90.7 males. For every 100 females age 18 and over, there were 86.8 males.

The median income for a household in the town was $30,873, and the median income for a family was $34,890. Males had a median income of $31,250 versus $20,536 for females. The per capita income for the town was $15,343. About 13.7% of families and 16.8% of the population were below the poverty line, including 24.2% of those under age 18 and 7.3% of those age 65 or over.

== Communities and locations ==
- Forest Lake Camp for Boys and Girls - FLC is a traditional overnight summer camp for boys and girls located on the Warrensburg and Chestertown lines. It has been around since 1926 and was built on the old stage coach road that went through town.
- Camp Echo Lake - CEL is a traditional coed residential summer camp located in Warrensburg. It was established in 1946.
- Riverbank – A hamlet on the town line in the northeast part of the town.
- Warrensburg – The hamlet of Warrensburg is located near the east town line on Route 9. The community is at the Schroon River and is the only significant settlement in the town.
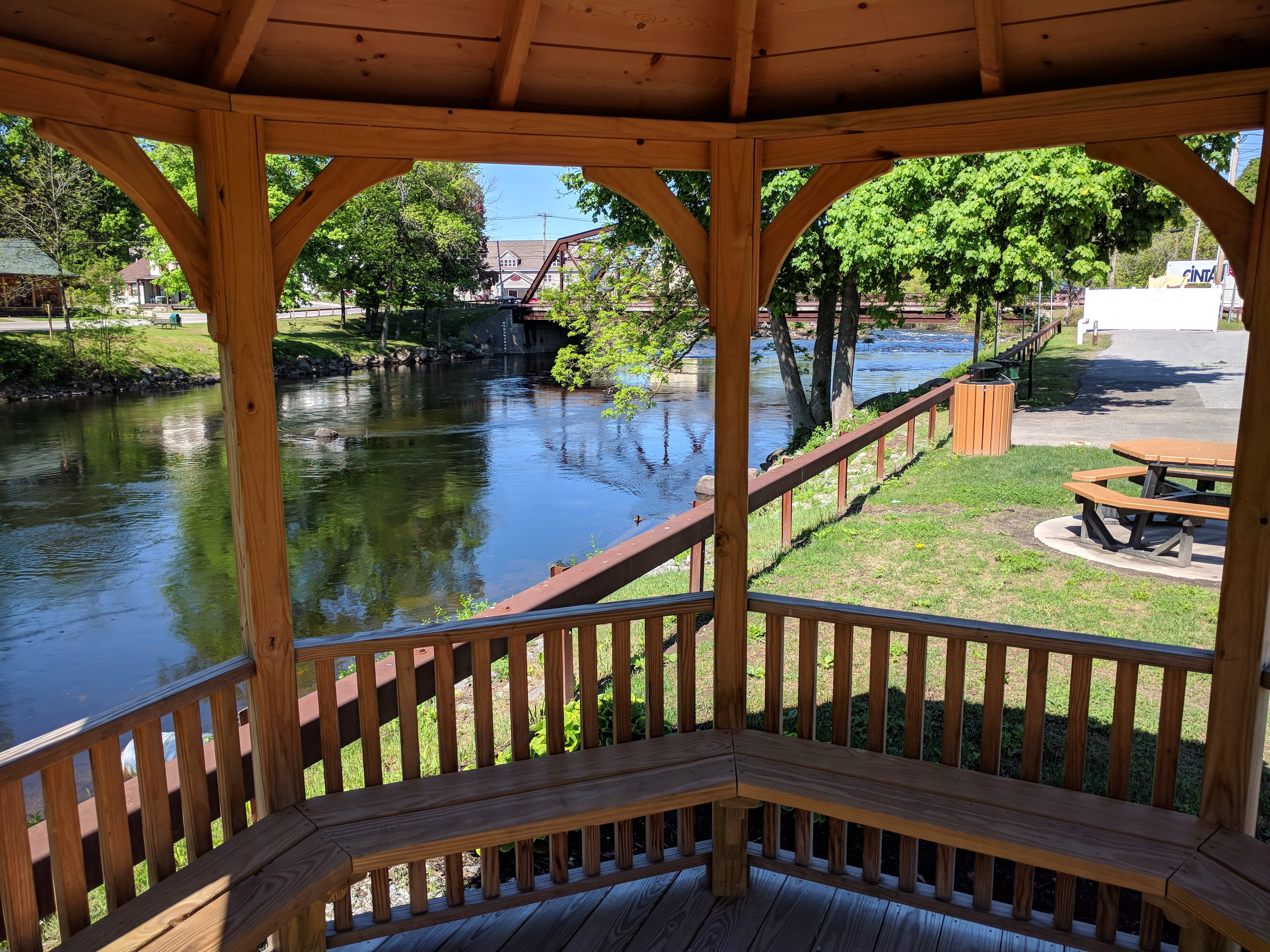
- The Gazebo at Warrensburg Mills Historic District.
  Warrensburg Mills Historic District - Established in 1975, contains 220 properties in the 40 acres of land approximately located between the Woolen Mill Bridge and the Osborne Bridge on the Schroon River.
- Sinai Retreats - formerly of Moodus, CT, Jewish educational retreat established in 1978, located on 100 acre campus across the Schroon River and next to the Hudson River.
- Ashland Park - located off Hudson Street in the hamlet of Warrensburg, it was home to the Warren County Fair from 1871 to 1929. The grounds continued to host harness racing for the next two decades, and in 1947 a 1/5th mile oval was added to accommodate midget and sprint car races. The track presented stock car races from 1952 until the early 1960s when the land was repurposed as a housing development. (Note: Geolocation of Ashland Park Auto Speedway: 43.4965°N 73.7845°W)

== Notable residents ==
- Floyd Bennett, acclaimed aviator who made the first flight to the North Pole, Medal of Honor Recipient.
- Charles Reed Bishop, Minister of Foreign Affairs for the Kingdom of Hawaii.
- Louis W. Emerson, Member of the U.S. House of Representatives from 1899 to 1903.
- Daniel P. Sheehan, Constitutional and public interest lawyer, public speaker, political activist and educator.

== See also ==
- Warrensburg Junior – Senior High School
- Warrensburg Hydroelectric Dam
