= Warrensburg Junior – Senior High School =

Warrensburg Junior - Senior High School
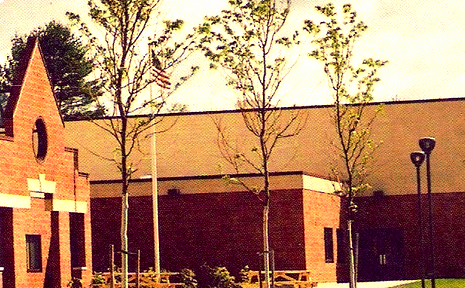

Location
- 103 Schroon River Rd; Warrensburg, New York; United States; 43°29′53.4″N 73°45′47.4″W

Information
- School type: Public (U.S.)
- Principal: Jeffery Holcomb
- Teaching staff: 39.50 (FTE)
- Grades: 7-12
- Enrollment: 279 (2023-2024)
- Student to teacher ratio: 7.06
- Campus type: Rural
- Color
- Mascot: Burgermeister
- Nickname: Burgers
- Website: highschool.wcsd.org

Warrensburg Junior – Senior High School is a high school located in Warrensburg, New York, United States. It holds about 600 students from Grades 7 - 12 and teaches according to the Board of Regents.
