= Fahey =

Fahey is an Irish surname. Alternate spellings include Fahie, Fahy and Fay. Notable people with the surname include:

- Brandon Fahey, American baseball player
- Brian Fahey (composer), British musical director
- Brian Fahey (ice hockey), American ice hockey player
- Caprina Fahey (1883–1959), British suffragette
- Charles P. Fahey (c. 1860 – 1913), American labor leader and politician
- Claire Fahey (born 1991), British real tennis player
- David M. Fahey, American professor of history
- Denis Fahey, Catholic priest
- Edward Henry Fahey (1844–1907), English artist
- Eugene M. Fahey (born 1951), American judge
- Frank Fahey, Irish politician
- James Charles Fahey (1903–1974), American author and publisher
- Jeff Fahey, American actor
- John Fahey (musician), American guitarist and composer
- John Fahey (politician), Australian politician
- John M. Fahey Jr., president and chief executive officer of the National Geographic Society
- Joseph Fahey, American Roman Catholic theologian
- Julie Fahey, American politician
- Katie Fahey, American activist
- Keith Fahey (born 1983), Irish footballer
- Marcella Fahey, American politician
- Martin J. Fahey, (1919–2013), Irish radio host and MC-Chicago
- Mary-Anne Fahey, Australian actor, comedian and writer
- Mike Fahey, American mayor
- Myrna Fahey (1933–1973), American actress
- Nancy Fahey (born 1958), American basketball coach
- Robert Fahey, Australian real tennis player
- Siobhan Fahey (born 1958), Irish singer and musician
- Terry Fahey, Australian rugby league footballer

== See also ==
- Fahy (surname)
- Fahie
- Fay (surname)
