= Warrensburg Hydroelectric Dam =

Power station in Warrensburg, New York

- Location of the power station
- Country: United States
- Location: Warrensburg, New York
- Coordinates: 43°28′59″N 73°47′54″W
- Status: Operational
- Owner: Boralex

Power generation
- Nameplate capacity: 2.9 MW

External links
- Website: www.boralex.com/projects/warrensburg

Warrensburg Hydroelectric Dam is a run-of-the-river hydroelectric generation plant located on the Schroon River in Warrensburg, NY. According to the National Inventory of Dams (NID), the dam was completed in 1909, designed by Besha Engineering, and modified in the year 1989. Currently the dam is owned and operated by the Quebec-based Boralex power company, and has a capacity of 3 megawatts, or enough energy to power 3,000 homes. The dam's reservoir serves as Warrensburg's boat launch and recreational area.
