= Fahy (surname) =

Fahy is a surname derived from the Irish surname Ó Fathaigh. Alternative spellings include Fahie, Fahey and Fay.

People named Fahy include:

- Anthony Dominic Fahy, (1805–1871), Irish Dominican priest and missionary
- Charles Fahy (1892–1979), Solicitor General of the United States
- Edward Francis Fahy (1922–2005), Irish physicist and administrator
- Francis Arthur Fahy (1854–1935), Irish nationalist, songwriter and poet
- Francis Patrick Fahy (1880–1953), Irish teacher, barrister and politician
- Greg Fahy, cryobiologist and biogerontologist
- Jack Fahy, U.S. government official
- Jim Fahy (1946–2022), Irish broadcaster, journalist and documentary-maker
- John Fahy, Scottish football player
- Meghann Fahy (born 1990), American actress and singer
- Michael Fahy, Irish farmer and politician
- Ollie Fahy (born 1975), Irish hurler
- Pádraic Fahy (born 1948), Irish sportsperson
- Patricia Fahy, American politician
- Sir Peter Fahy (born 1959), British police officer
- Shea Fahy (born 1962), Gaelic football player
