= Lydia Mary Fay =

American missionary and educator

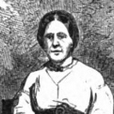
- Born: 1804; Bennington, Vermont, U.S.
- Died: October 5, 1878 (aged 73–74); Chefoo (Yantai), China
- Resting place: Foreigners cemetery of Chefoo
- Occupations: missionary; educator; writer; translator
- Writing career
- Language: English

Lydia Mary Fay (1804 - October 5, 1878) was a 19th-century American missionary, educator, writer, and translator. She was one of the band of women that laid broad and deep foundations in the early days of missionary work in the Chinese empire.

Affiliated with the Protestant Episcopal Church, Fay entered the missionary field from Albany, New York, sailing for China, November 8, 1850, She established in her own house in Shanghai a boarding school for boys, and from this she educated teachers and preachers to carry on the work. Known as "Lady Fay" to her pupils, her efforts developed from this very small beginning into the Doane Hall and Theological School.

For nineteen months, Fay worked on revising the Syllabic Dictionary manuscript. She contributed to magazines and papers, and had exceptional translation skills from Chinese language into English.

== Early life and education ==
Lydia Mary Fay was born in Bennington, Vermont in 1804, the daughter of Ethan Allen Fay and Catharine (Street) Fay. She spent her early life near Albany, New York. Her studies included reading European literature.

== Career ==
=== Teacher ===
Originally a Presbyterian, Fay became an Episcopalian in 1840. She began her career as a governess near Alexandria, Virginia. In 1847, she removed to Warrensburg, New York before moving to Miller's Tavern, Virginia to serve as principal at the Midway Female Academy.

=== Missionary ===
At the age of 46, she began her missionary work, appointed as a missionary teacher under Bishop William Jones Boone, of the Protestant Episcopal Church Mission (PECM). She sailed for China, in the ship Horatio, November 8, 1850. Writing to a friend soon after her arrival in early 1851, Fay said:— "It is a difficult thing to keep the heart at the spiritual heights it has gained, and perhaps the first rude shock to the young missionary's faith, on his arrival in heathen lands, is the utter indifference of the people, the clouds of incense that dim his sight, and the harsh music that deafens his ears, as he finds himself in some lofty temple, near huge idols, before whom crowds are prostrating themselves and offering all the worship their darkened, untaught hearts are capable of, and I exclaim, 'Who is sufficient for these things, and how can the still, small voice of the Spirit ever touch the hearts of these noisy idolaters, or how can the missionary be seen through the clouds of incense, or the voice be heard in the din of gongs and drums?'"

The PECM was in poor condition during the American Civil War (1861–65). The funds were low, and the work languished. In 1860, Fay moved with her students to the Church Missionary Society, in which she had been obliged for a while to work in consequence of a lack of means to sustain the school. In 1867, she returned to the PECM school.

Meanwhile, she had become acquainted with a small school of orphan boys, under the charge of Dr. Henderson, an English physician, who was known by missionaries and people throughout the city. These orphan boys he had found, poor and destitute and homeless, wandering about the streets. He fed, clothed and taught them. When he died, his widow, on her return to England, turned them over to the care of Fay.

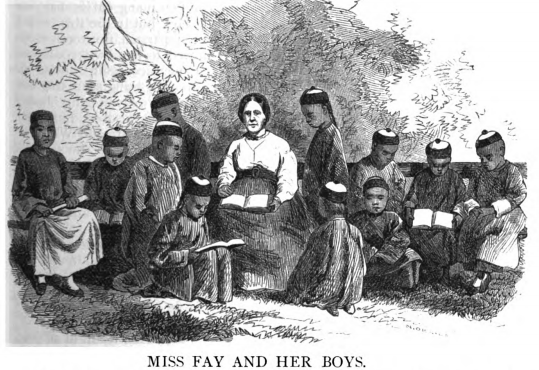

She established in her own house in Shanghai a boarding school for boys, which she called her "gravest responsibility," as through this agency she hoped to raise up teachers and preachers who would carry on future work. She not only taught in the school, carried all the domestic cares, provided for the clothing, kept all the finances, but devoted much time to the study and translation of the Chinese language. In addition, she had the oversight of boys' day schools, and conducted a class of student teachers.

A few years later, a donation from some women in Pittsburgh, Pennsylvania, together with a little money contributed in Shanghai, enabled Fay to receive a few more boys, so that the school numbered twenty pupils. In addition, she traveled to Kong Wan with Mr. Nelson on Sundays and Thursdays, where she has charge of a girls' school, and attended the sick in the hospital. She lived frugally, without many of the comforts which are generally thought necessary in an inhospitable climate.

At the close of her 25th year in China, the school which she had established was turned over to the Episcopal Board. It had developed into Doane Hall and Theological School, with president, professors, and with ten Chinese teachers. Some of her pupils and joined the Christian ministry. This anniversary was held in her own house, and was largely attended. A translation of an address was read, from a large number of Chinese, congratulating "Lady Fay" on the memorable occasion.

=== Writer ===
Fay aided Dr. Samuel Wells Williams in the revision of the manuscript of his Syllabic Dictionary. She was engaged in this work for nineteen months, and with the aid of a Chinese assistant, revised every one of the 60,000 phrases. She was also a contributor to magazines and papers, and published a good translation of the various official documents connected with the emperor's marriage in 1872. She was said to have "exceptional skills in translating Chinese written texts".

== Later life ==
In the 28 years of her missionary career, Fay visited the United States but once. Her later life included several age-related illnesses so that, from the mid-1860s, she took extended breaks from her work, either resting in her room or at Chinese sanatorium towns. Her health continued to fail, and a trip to Chefoo (now known as Yantai) was recommended, but it did not improve her health. She had a great desire to return to her home in Shanghai, but this was denied her, and on October 5, 1878, surrounded by missionaries and friends, she died. The funeral was attended by a large number of visitors and residents, and the flag of the United States Consulate was put at half-mast in token of respect to Fay. She was buried in the foreigners cemetery of Chefoo.
