= Mixter Blacksmith Shop =

Historic commercial building in New York, United States

- U.S. National Register of Historic Places
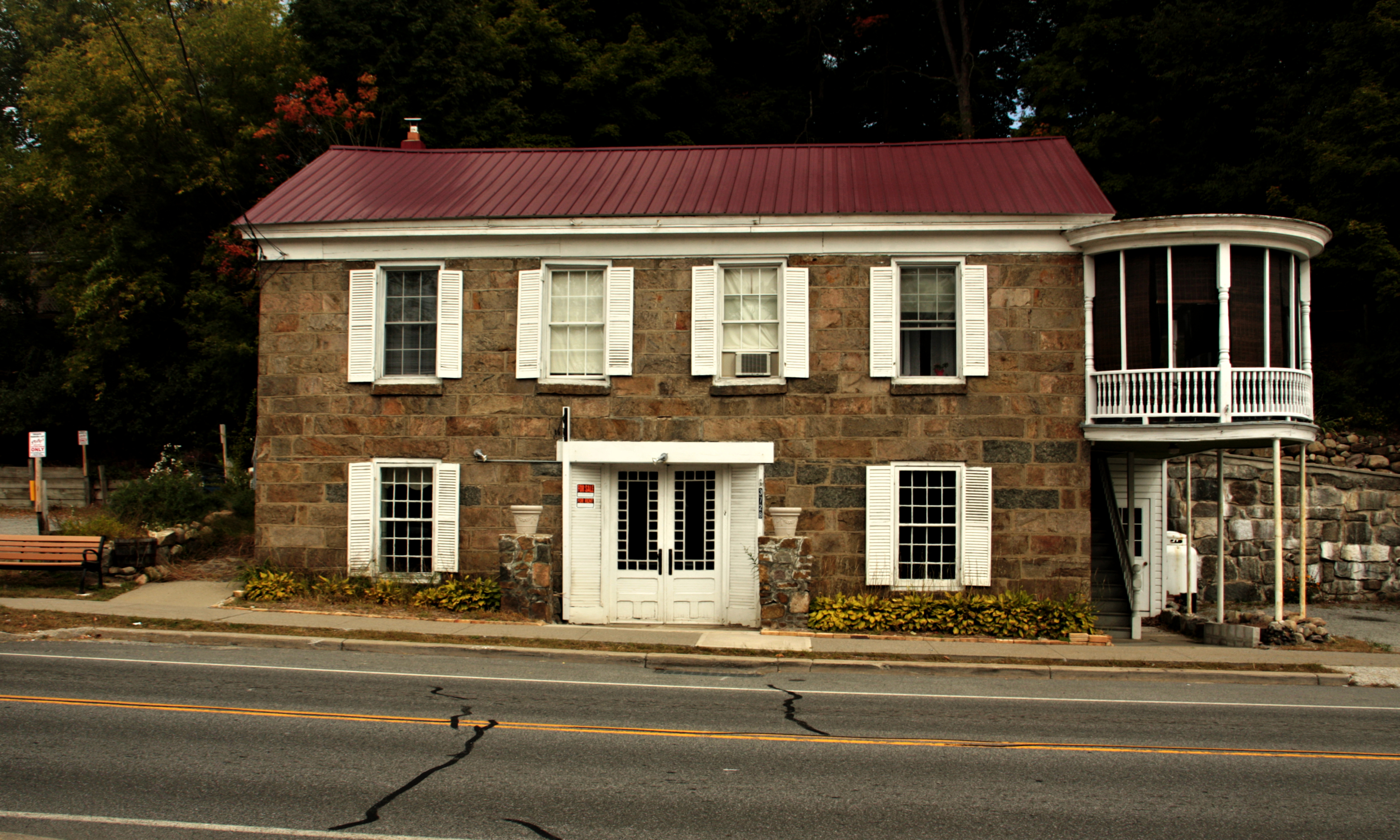
- The Mixter Blacksmith Shop in 2016

- Location within New York Location within the United States
- Location: 3728 Main St., Warrensburg, New York
- Coordinates: 43°29′26.397″N 73°45′58.1112″W
- Area: less than one acre
- Built: 1840
- Architectural style: Greek Revival, Queen Anne
- NRHP reference No.: 02001051
- Added to NRHP: September 12, 2002

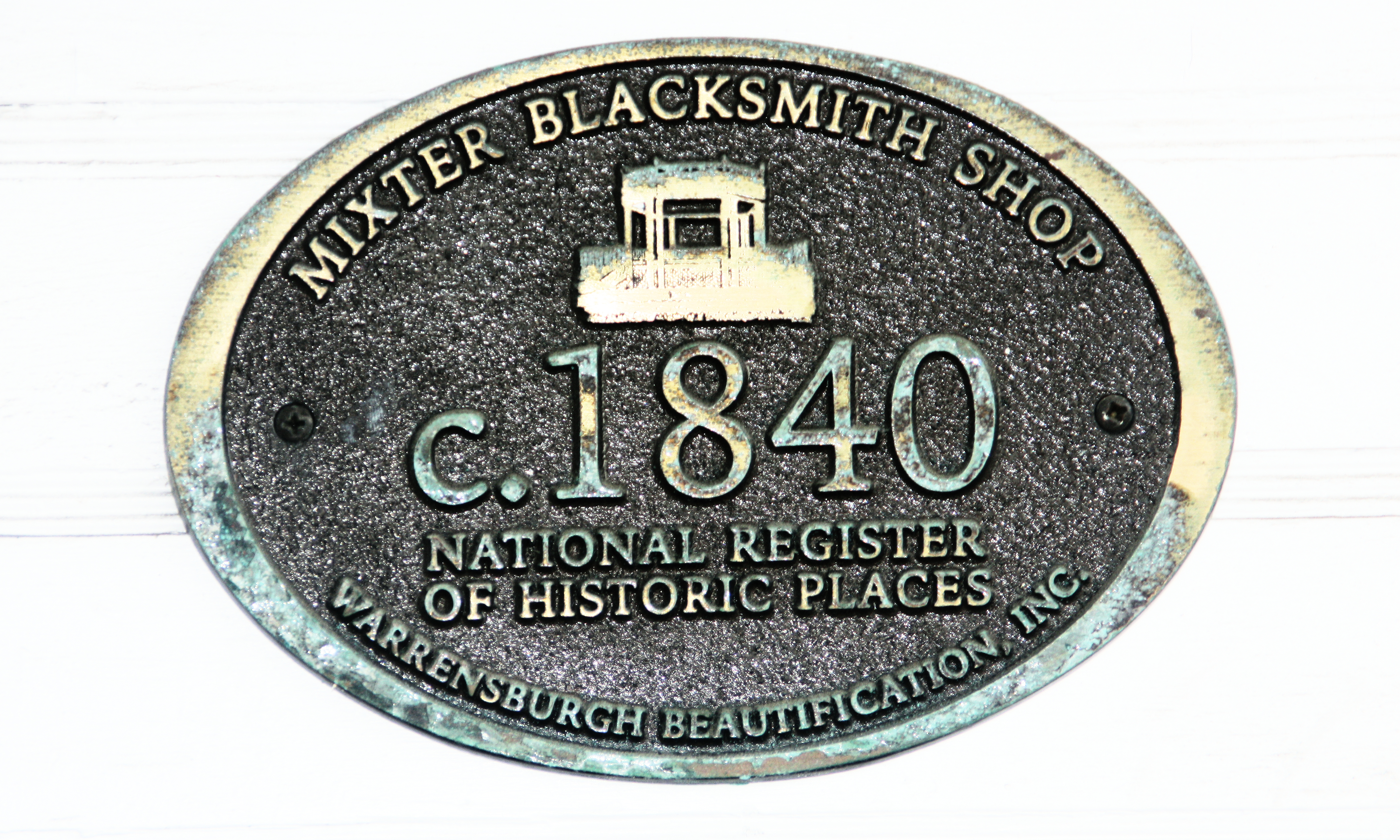
Mixter Blacksmith Shop

Mixter Blacksmith Shop is a historic blacksmith shop located at Warrensburg, Warren County, New York. It was built about 1840 in the Greek Revival style to house a commercial operation and modified about 1890 in the Queen Anne style to accommodate mixed use activities. It is a two-story building built into a slope. It is constructed of load-bearing local granite and topped by a medium pitched roof clad in raised seam metal.

It was added to the National Register of Historic Places in 2002.
