= Faith Fay =

American actress

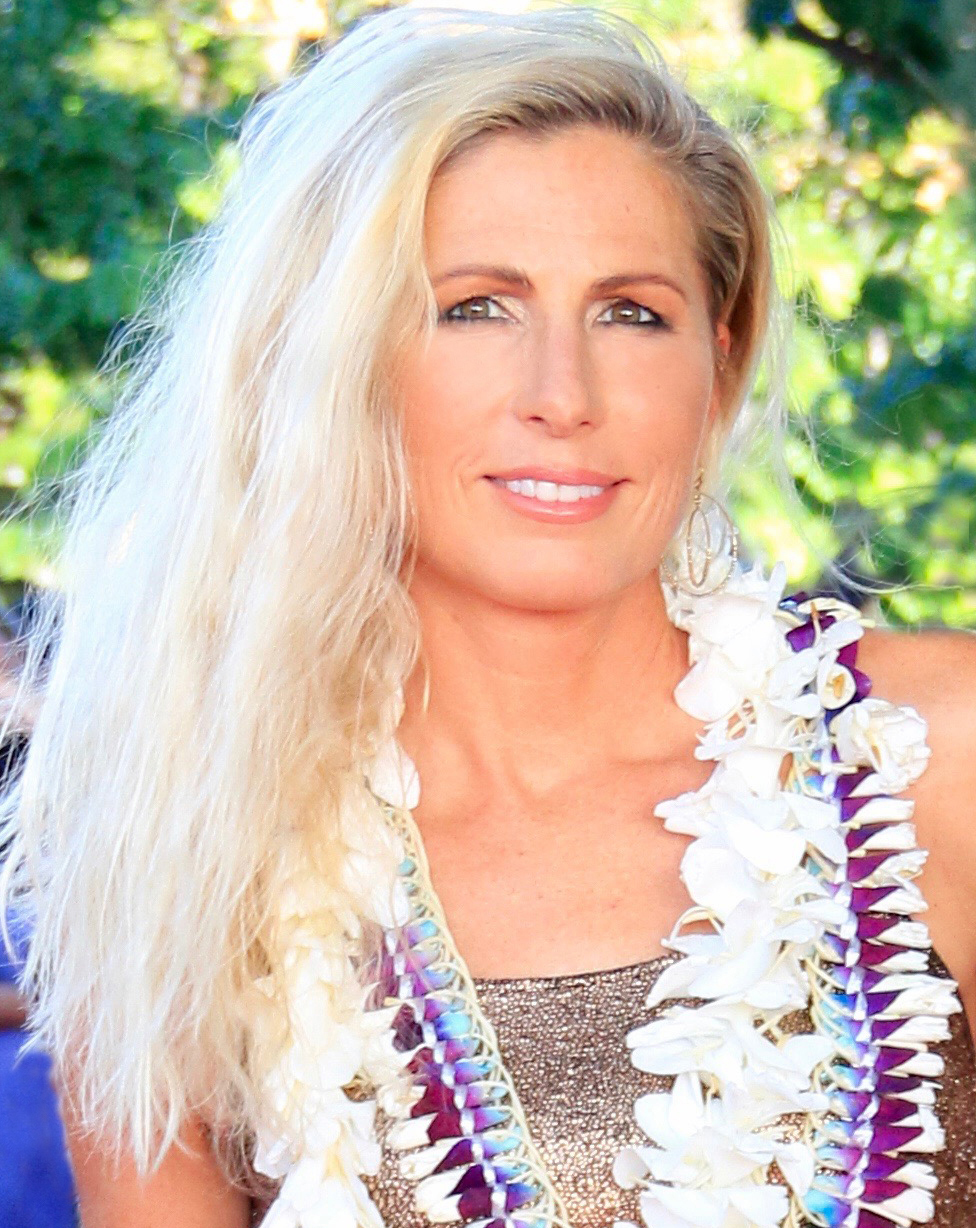
- Fay at the 2018 Magnum P.I. Premiere
- Occupation: Actress
- Website: faithfay.com

Faith Fay is an American actress.

== Career ==
Fay appeared in the film "Lilo & Stitch" (2025). She co-starred on the CBS series "Magnum P.I." (2018) and "Hawaii Five-O" (2020) Soul Surfer (2011), the true story of pro surfer Bethany Hamilton. She was a recurring cast member on ABC's Lost (2004). She appeared on the television series Beyond the Break (2006) as the high school character Carmen. She also appeared as CIA agent McNeil in Tides of War (2005), as FBI agent Alice Wells in the indie film Killer TV (2006), as Becca in the indie film Every Now & Then (2007), as Romaji in Tengoku de kimi ni aetara (2007) based on the tragic life story of PWA windsurfing world champion Natsuki Iijima, as Shinko in 50 First Kisses (2017), and as Moana Server in Hiro to Kiiro: Hawai to Watashi no Pankeiki Monogatari (2018).

As a filmmaker Fay has worked on documentaries including Beyond Sight (2014), and Surfers and Cowboys (2016). Her television work includes the series Retratos Do Mar (2013), Homem Peixe (2014), Mulheres Do Mar (2016), Filhos Do Havai (2017), Salva Vidas (2018), and Surfing Rockers (2019). "Broken Jaws" (2026)
