= Kate Fay =

New Zealand chef

Kate Fay is a New Zealand chef and food writer based in Auckland. She is also part-owner of a top city restaurant.

Fay was born and raised in Auckland. Her mother, Bev Fay, ran a milkbar and Fay spent some time working in it, which she later said taught her how to work under pressure.

Fay began her working life as an adult in an office, before going travelling overseas. She first visited London and then Israel, where she lived on a kibbutz for eight months and cooked in its kitchen. She decided to become a chef and returned to London to work in restaurants there. She later returned to New Zealand and in 1999 she was appointed head chef of the Parnell restaurant Cibo. In 2003 she became a part-owner of the restaurant.

== Awards and recognition ==
Fay was voted Best Auckland Chef in 2004 and, in the same year, Cibo was voted the second Best Restaurant. Cibo also holds the Beef and Lamb Excellence Award and has been nominated in the Metro Top 50 Restaurants awards and Cuisine Restaurant of the Year awards. In 2010 and 2012 it was named Metro Best Smart Casual restaurant.

== Publications ==
- Cibo: Food with Attitude (2005), co-written with Jeremy Turner, Hachette Press
