= Charles César de Fay de La Tour-Maubourg =

French soldier and politician

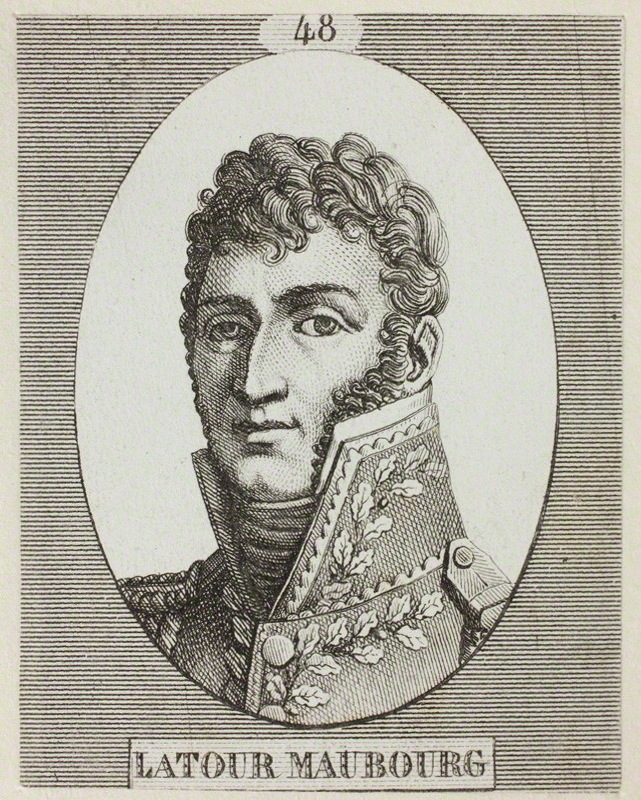
- Born: 11 February 1756; Grenoble
- Died: 28 May 1831; Paris
- Relatives: Victor de Fay de La Tour-Maubourg

Signature
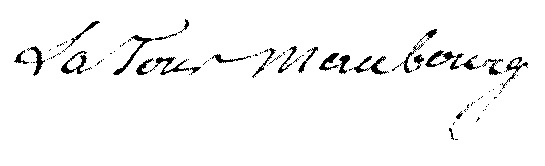

Marie-Charles-César de Faÿ, comte de la Tour-Maubourg (11 February 1757, at La Motte-de-Galaure, Drôme – 28 April 1831, in Paris) was a French soldier and politician during the French Revolution and the First French Empire. His father was Claude Florimond de Faÿ (1712–1790); his mother was Vacheron Bermont Marie Françoise (b. 1712).

== Monarchy ==
De Faÿ was colonel of the Regiment of Soissons in 1789.

== Revolution ==
He was appointed to the nobility of Puy-en-Velay in the Estates General. He was a friend of Gilbert du Motier, marquis de Lafayette. De Faÿ was one of the first nobles to join the Third Estate. He was a representative of Nord and Pas de Calais.

De Faÿ was charged, with Antoine Barnave and Jerome Pétion, with returning the royal family to Paris following its flight to Varennes in June 1791. His devotion on this occasion was misunderstood by Marie-Antoinette. However, in her memoirs, Madame Tourzel, witness to the facts, paid tribute to his dedication to the royal family.

De Faÿ was colonel of the 3ème régiment de chasseurs à cheval from 1791 to February 1792. With the separation of the National Constituent Assembly, he accompanied the marquis de Fayette with the Army of the Center in 1792 and emigrated with him after the dismissal by Louis XVI on 10 August 1792. Captured at Rochefort, Belgium, with Lafayette, and imprisoned by Austria, he was released after the Treaty of Campo-Formio (18 October 1797) and lived in exile in Hamburg.

== Under the Consulate and the First Empire ==
De Faÿ returned to France in 1798 and became a member of the Corps législatif (under the Directory), after which he became a member of the Senate in 1804, under the First French Empire. In 1808 he became military governor of Cherbourg, which he helped to become a major port. He was excluded from the House of Peers from the Hundred Days until 1819. Concerned with the management of its inheritance, he took part in financing the industrial activities of Pierre Samuel du Pont de Nemours, scion of the American business family.

== After the Restoration ==
In 1814, de Faÿ was named at the time of the Bourbon Restoration and preserved his position during the Hundred Days. He was a government commissioner for certain departments in the west of France. After the fall of Napoleon, he was excluded from government until 1819. He was reinstated to the Senate, then made Knight of the Order of Saint Louis. Napoleon had made him commander of the Legion of Honor.

César de Faÿ de La Tour-Maubourg married Henriette de Tenella Pinault, heiress of a member of the Parliament of Douai. They had many descendants.

He died in 1831 in Paris.

== Relatives ==
=== Brothers ===
His brother, Marie Victor de Fay, marquis de Latour-Maubourg, was a Cavalry Corps commander, survived the Russian Campaign and was wounded at the battle of Leipzig.

Juste-Charles de la Tour-Maubourg married Anastasie de La Fayette, daughter of Lafayette. They had three daughters. The second, Jenny, married General Ettore Perrone di San Martino, politician of the Kingdom of Piedmont-Sardinia. Among their descendants is the present Queen Paola of Belgium.

=== Children ===
Marie-Charles, comte de La Tour-Maubourg (11 February 1757 - 28 May 1831) married Charlotte, daughter of Charles Pinault de Thénelles, (d. 18 June 1837). They had six children:

- Just Pons Florimond marquis de La Tour-Maubourg; married Caroline de La Perron de Saint Martino (1788 - 20 June 1855? 1858?) on 11 October 1815;
- Adèle (b. 22 September 1783); married 19 September 1801 to François de Baigneux de Courcival;
- Rodolphe (8 October 1787 - 27 May 1871), vicomte de La Tour-Maubourg, 1845 pair de France;
- Marie-Stéphanie (30 September 1790 - 21 February 1868); married in 1810 Antoine comte Andréossy (6 March 1761 - 10 September 1828);
- Eléonore (d. 9 April 1831);
- Armand-Charles (22 July 1801 - 18 April 1845), vicomte de La Tour-Maubourg, 1841 pair de France; married Octavie Daru (d. 18 April 1834).

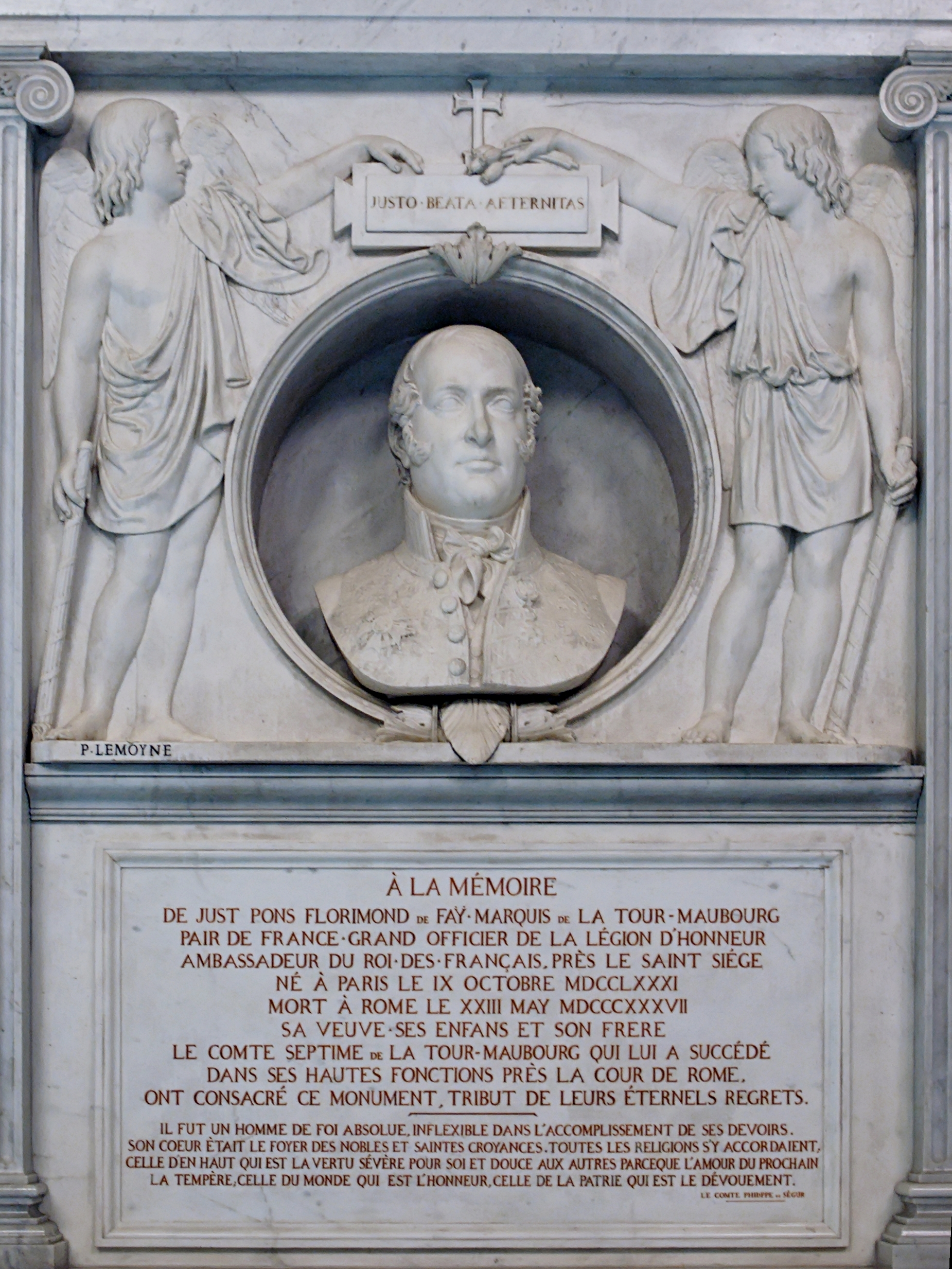
Monument of Just Florimond

Just Pons Florimond de Faÿ de la Tour Maubourg (1781–1837) was Auditor with the Conseil d'État under the Empire and ambassador from France to Dresden, Constantinople and Rome. From March 1809 until 1811 he was Chargé d'Affaires to Constantinople but was recalled upon the peace between England and Turkey. He was made officer of the Legion of Honor in 1830. In 1831, at the consistory that elected Pope Gregory XVI, the marquis had the honour of informing the assembled cardinals that Louis-Philippe would waive his right of veto with assurance that only a wise and virtuous pontiff could be elected by such a wise and virtuous assembly.

Rodolphe (1787–1871) was an officer in the campaigns of the Empire, major general, officer of the Legion of Honor.

Armand - Septime (1801–1845), bachelor of law, was Master of the Requests to the Council of State. Under the Monarchy of July, he was Ambassador in Naples and Spain, then Rome, where he succeeded his older brother. He was commander of the Legion of Honor. A portrait of his wife painted by Théodore Chassériau was recently acquired by the Metropolitan Museum in New York.

=== Grandchildren ===
Notable members of the following generation include César Florimond de la Tour Maubourg (1820–1886), son of Just Florimond and Caroline de La Perron de Saint Martino (sister of Hector Perrone de San Martino). A cavalry officer in 3rd Regiment of Chasseurs-à-Cheval. He was administrator of the Grand Central Railroad, fr:Compagnie du chemin de fer du Grand Central appointed to Haute-Loire and, throughout the Second Empire, honorary chamberlain of Napoleon III and captain of the Imperial Hunt.

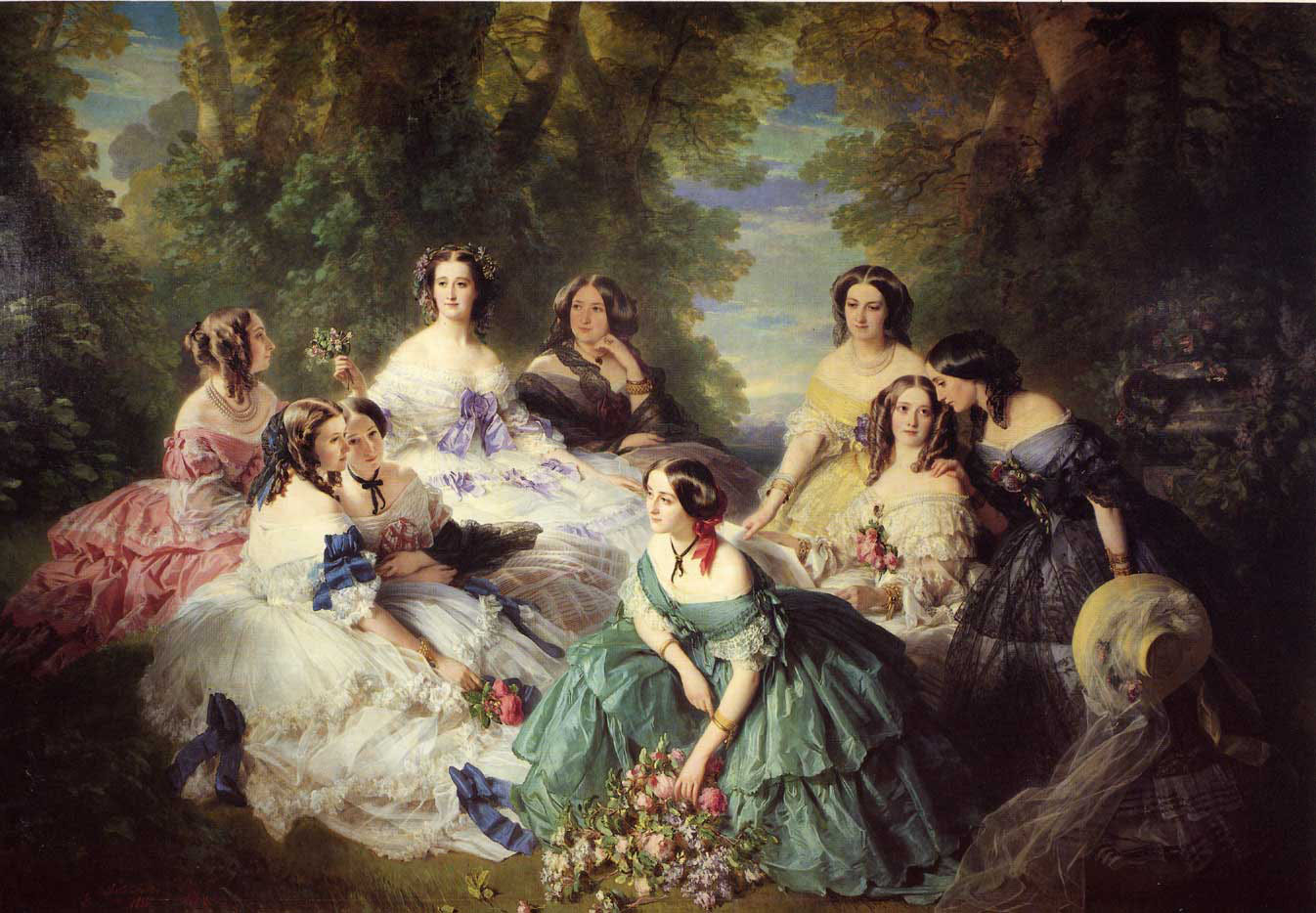
Madame la Tour Maubourg, lady in waiting to Empress Eugenie

In 1849, he married Anne Mortier of Trévise (1824–1900), granddaughter of marshal Mortier duke of Trévise and Lady of the Table of Empress Eugenie, who appears in the extreme righthand side of Winterhalter'sFranz Xaver Winterhalter famous painting. Some of her notebooks were published by General Thimble-Brissac in Review of the Napoleonean Memory. Their son was killed during the Franco-Prussian War, while their daughter died shortly after her marriage, without issue. They were left the Château de Frouard. After the death of her husband, the marchioness withdrew to her various residences at Maubourg, Paris, Cannes and Glareins (Ain). The last descendants of the Faÿ family de la Tour-Maubourg are buried in a mausoleum in the commune of Saint-Maurice-de-Lignon, built from the plans of Lyons architect Carra.

== Sources ==
- Maubourg French article
- F J of Basterot: Memories of young childhood Paris, 1896
- CH Bertholet: Contribution to History of the Faÿ de la Tour Maubourg; Per Lou Chamis, special issue, 1982.
- Madam de Tourzel: Mémoires, The mercury of France, 1986.
- History and dictionary of French revolution (1789 - 1799) of Jean Tulard, Jean-François Beech, Alfred Fierro
- R of Nomazy: Maubourg, Edition of the Collieries of the Loire, 1956
- L. Castling: Catalogue Historique of Généraux, Paris, Desaide, 1896
- Biographical dictionary of the General Officers High-Loire
- It was once Maubourg, Association of the Friends of the Field of Maubourg, 2006
- Legion d' Honor: Legionaries of Haute-Loire.
- New Générale Biography; Volume 29, Didot, 1859.
- Chapelle Rablais Genealogy
- Le Chateau des Moyeux, history
- Dynastie de Faÿ, Genealogy
- Fiches individuelles, nesmefamily
- NPG D15589, Marie Charles César de Faÿ, comte de Latour Maubourg, National Portrait Gallery
- Comtesse de La Tour-Maubourg (née Marie-Louise-Charlotte-Gabrielle Thomas de Pange, 1816–1850), (second wife of Armand-Charles-Septime de Faÿ, comte de La Tour-Maubourg), The Metropolitan Museum
- Portrait de l'Impératrice Eugénie entourée de ses dames d'honneur, Lieu de conservation, Compiègne; musée national du château de Compiègne
