= Dufay (disambiguation) =

Guillaume Du Fay (c. 1397–1474) was a French composer and music theorist.

Dufay or du Fay may also refer to:

== People ==
- Charles François de Cisternay du Fay (1698–1739), French chemist
- Claude Dufay (1926–2001), French entomologist, see Argyrogrammatini
- Jean Dufay (1896–1967), French astronomer
  - Dufay (crater), a crater on the Moon named after Jean Dufay
- Marie-Guite Dufay (born 1949), French politician
- Rick Dufay (born 1952), French-American guitarist, Aerosmith
- DuFay A. Fuller (1852–1924), American businessman and politician

== Toponyms ==
- Dufay River, a tributary of lake Buies, in Québec, Canada

== See also ==
- Dufay Collective, an early-music ensemble from the United Kingdom, specializing in Medieval and Renaissance music and named after Guillaume Du Fay
- Dufaycolor, an additive color process for motion pictures
