= Marianne Fay =

American economist, writer

Academic background
- Education: Columbia University

Academic work
- Discipline: Economics

Marianne Fay is an American economist and writer. She specializes in infrastructure, development, and climate change.

== Education ==
Marianne Fay received a PhD in economics from Columbia University in 1994, with a dissertation on "Infrastructure, Income Distribution and Growth".

== Career ==
Fay is an researches economics and global climate change. She serves as Chief Economist for the Sustainable Development Vice Presidency at the World Bank, where she previously served as Chief Economist for Climate Change. While working with the World Bank, she has led a number of reports and authored multiple articles on the topics of infrastructure, urbanization, and climate change. She regularly lectures at conferences.

Fay has long-maintained that,— "Climate change represents a direct and immediate threat to poverty alleviation.” In speaking with the Rwanda's The New Times in 2009, she noted,— “Countries in Sub-Saharan Africa are disproportionately affected by climate change... They need scaled-up financial and technological support to help vulnerable people adapt to climate change, while also meeting urgent energy needs.”

In 2010, Fay co-directed the World Development Report on Development and Climate Change, and has contributed to a number of additional World Development Reports. In 2012, she became a founding member of the Green Growth Knowledge Platform, led by the Global Green Growth Institute, the Organisation for Economic Co-operation and Development (OCED), the United Nations Environment Programme, United Nations Industrial Development Organization, and the World Bank. Fay spoke to reporters on the heels of a World Bank report release in 2017 about the need for Latin America to future-proof its infrastructure. She is currently a member of the Green Growth Knowledge Platform's Steering Committee.

== Selected works ==
- Rethinking Infrastructure in Latin America and the Caribbean. 2017, ISBN 978-1-4648-1101-2
- Shock Waves. 2016, ISBN 978-1-4648-0673-5
- Decarbonizing Development. 2015, ISBN 978-1-4648-0479-3
- Adapting to Climate Change in Eastern Europe and Central Asia. 2010, ISBN 978-0-8213-8131-1
- Current Debates on Infrastructure Policy. World Bank Publications, 2009.

=== Working papers ===
- Funding and financing infrastructure: the joint-use of public and private finance. Policy Research Working Paper Series from The World Bank, 2018.
- Rising incomes and inequality of access to infrastructure among Latin American households. Policy Research Working Paper Series from The World Bank, 2017.
- Climate change and poverty—an analytical framework. Policy Research Working Paper Series from The World Bank, 2014.
- Green industrial policies: when and how. Policy Research Working Paper Series from The World Bank, 2013.
- From Growth to Green Growth - a Framework. NBER Working Papers from National Bureau of Economic Research, Inc, 2012.
- Financing greener and climate-resilient infrastructure in developing countries - challenges and opportunities. EIB Papers from European Investment Bank, Economics Department, 2010.
- Adapting to Climate Change in ECA. World Bank Other Operational Studies from The World Bank, 2009.
- Death of distance? Economic implications of infrastructure improvement in Russia. EIB Papers from European Investment Bank, Economics Department, 2008.
- Current debates on infrastructure policy. Policy Research Working Paper Series from The World Bank, 2007.
- Product market regulation in Bulgaria: a comparison with OECD Countries. Policy Research Working Paper Series from The World Bank, 2007.
