= Juste-Charles de Fay de La Tour-Maubourg =

French aristocrat (1774–1846)

- Born: 1774
- Died: 1846 (aged 71–72); Novara, Kingdom of Sardinia
- Occupations: Aristocrat; Fighter
- Spouse: Anastasie de la Fayette (m. 1798)

Juste-Charles de Faÿ de la Tour-Maubourg (1774–1846) was a French aristocrat and fighter in the French Revolution.

== Revolution ==
He was captured at Rochefort, Belgium, with his brothers, and Lafayette, and imprisoned by the Austrians, but was soon released. He lived in exile until the release of his brother. After the Lafayettes release from Olmutz, he married Anastasie de la Fayette (1777–1863), at Madame de Tessé's Witmold, on 9 May 1798.

== Restoration ==
He rebuilt the family castle, le Château des Mayeux, destroyed during the Revolution by a fire.

He became mayor of La Chapelle-Rablais in 1830, and owned le Château des Mayeux until 1846.

== Personal life ==
His father was Claude Florimond de Faÿ (1712 – 1790) and his mother was Marie Françoise de Vachon de Belmont (b.1712).

=== Brothers ===
His brother, Marie Victor de Fay, marquis de Latour-Maubourg, was a Cavalry Corps commander, survived the Russian Campaign, and was wounded at the battle of Leipzig.

His older brother, Charles César de Fay de La Tour-Maubourg (b. 11 February 1757 – 28 May 1831) was also captured at Rochefort, Belgium, and imprisoned with Lafayette in Olmutz prison until September 1797.

=== Children ===
He married Anastasie de la Fayette (1777–1863), on 9 May 1798. She was the daughter of Marquis de Lafayette, and Adrienne de La Fayette. She followed her mother Adrienne de La Fayette to Olmutz prison; she copied her letters from prison. After 1848 she lived in Turin with her daughter.

Their first daughter Celestine married Baron de Brigode, and Jenny (the second) married Comte Hector Perrone di San-Martino (12 January 1789 – 29 Mar 1849), on 2 Feb 1833. He was a politician of the Kingdom of Piedmont. His father was Carlo Giuseppe Perrone di San Martino, and his mother was Paola d' Argentero-Bersezio. Henry Clay attend the wedding.

Comte Hector Perrone di San-Martino graduated from Saint-Cyr in 1806, was wounded at the battle of Wagram, and three times at the Battle of Montmirail. He was killed at the Battle of Novara in the Piedmont, Italy, on 22 March 1849.

One of the Comte's descendants is Queen Paola of Belgium.
