= Victor de Fay de La Tour-Maubourg =

Marie-Victor-Nicolas de Faÿ Marquis de La Tour-Maubourg
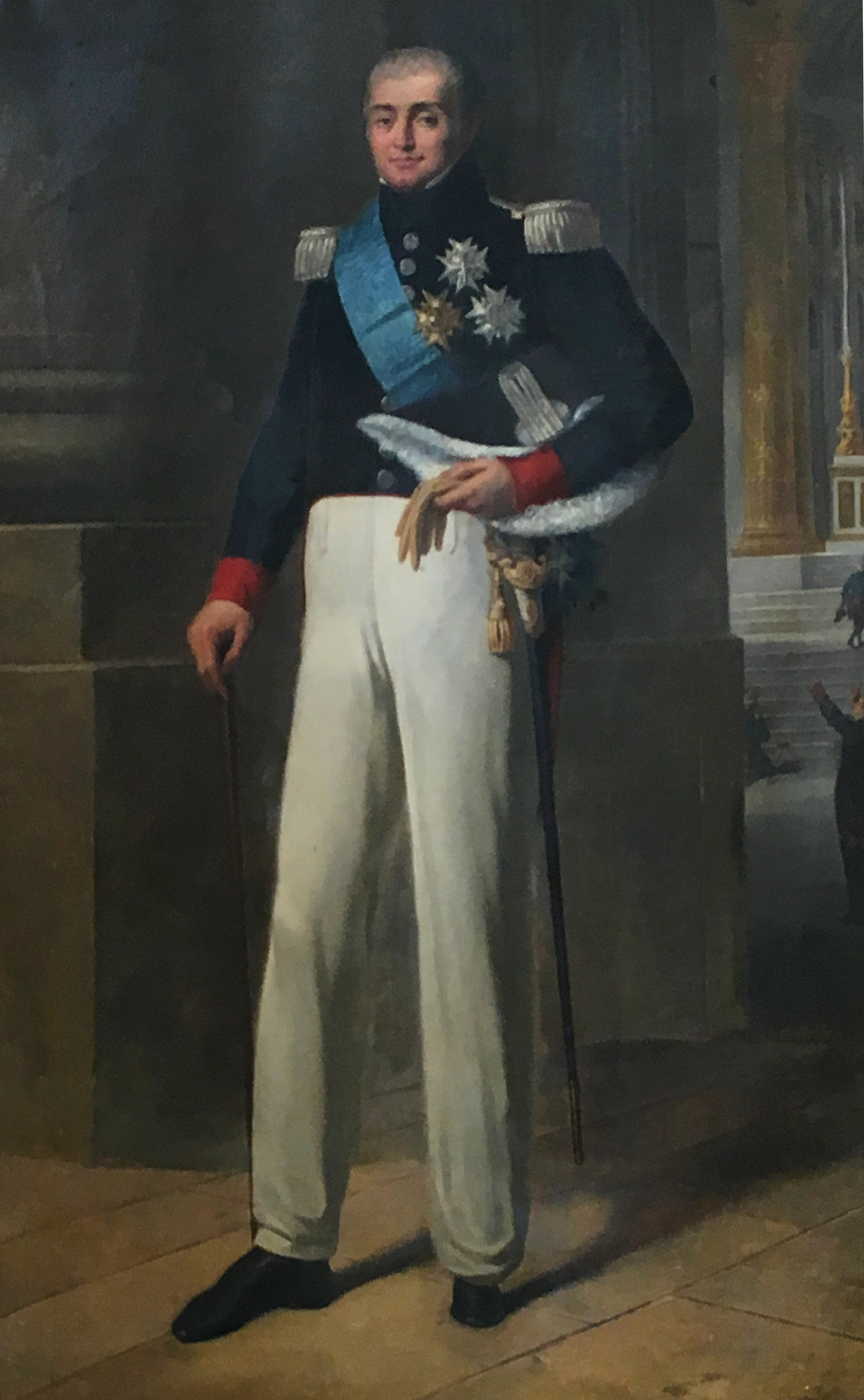
- Portrait of the Marquis during his time as Minister of War.

Minister of War
- In office 19 November 1819 – 14 December 1821
- Preceded by: Laurent de Gouvion Saint-Cyr
- Succeeded by: Claude Victor-Perrin, Duc de Belluno

Governor of the Les Invalides
- In office December 1821 – July 1830
- Preceded by: Louis-Antoine de Lignaud de Lussac
- Succeeded by: Jean-Baptiste Jourdan

Personal details
- Born: 22 May 1768 La Motte-de-Galaure, Dauphiné, Kingdom of France
- Died: 11 November 1850 (aged 82) Dammarie-lès-Lys, Île-de-France, French Second Republic

Military service
- Allegiance: Kingdom of France; Kingdom of the French; First French Republic; First French Empire (Bourbon Restoration in France) Kingdom of France
- Branch/service: French Royal Army; French Revolutionary Army; French Imperial Army; French Royal Army
- Years of service: before 1792 – 1830
- Rank: Divisional General
- Battles/wars: See list: Napoleonic Wars; War of the Second Coalition; Battle of Alexandria; War of the Third Coalition; Battle of Austerlitz; War of the Fourth Coalition; Battle of Jena–Auerstedt; Battle of Heilsberg; Battle of Friedland; Peninsular War; Battle of Talavera; Battle of Ocaña; Battle of Albuera; French Invasion of Russia; Battle of Borodino; War of the Sixth Coalition; Battle of Bautzen; Battle of Lützen; Battle of Dresden; Battle of Leipzig

Marie-Victor-Nicolas de Faÿ, Marquis de La Tour-Maubourg (French: [maʁi viktɔʁ nikɔlɑ də fa.i də la tuʁ mobuʁ]; 22 May 1768 – 11 November 1850) was a French cavalry commander under France's Ancien Régime before rising to prominence during the First French Empire.

Under the Restoration, he served as a diplomat and parliamentarian; after being created a Marquis, he was also briefly in government as Minister of War between 1819 and 1821.

== Early years and family ==
Ancestral arms de Faÿ

Of aristocratic descent, his father was Claude-Florimond de Faÿ, comte de Coisse (1712–1790) and his mother was Marie-Françoise (1712–1793), daughter of Nicolas de Vachon, marquis de Belmont.

De Faÿ joined the French Army as a Sous-lieutenant in the Gardes du Corps. He was promoted colonel of the 3rd Chasseurs-à-Cheval Regiment, 5 February 1792, before serving at Philippeville, Grisvelle and Maubeuge.

In August 1792, he was captured by the Austrians at Rochefort, being taken prisoner with Gilbert du Motier, marquis de Lafayette. However, his release was quickly negotiated while his brother was eventually released only after the Treaty of Campo-Formio in 1797.

De Faÿ then became an émigré living in Hamburg and Brussels. In 1804 at Utrecht, Colonel de Faÿ married Pétronille van Rijssel (later styled marquise de La Tour-Maubourg), who predeceased him on 17 July 1844.

His elder brother, Charles César de Fay de La Tour-Maubourg was also a French Army general, and his younger brother, Juste-Charles de la Tour-Maubourg was married to Anastasie de La Fayette (1777–1863).

== Egypt ==
At the end of 1799 de Faÿ returned to France and was posted to Egypt by the First Consul. There he served as Aide-de-Camp to General Jean Baptiste Kléber, who both received head wounds at Alexandria caused by an incendiary-device, 13 March 1801. After Kléber's assassination he was appointed AdC to General Jacques-Francois Menou.

== Campaigns of 1805–1807 ==
De Faÿ was present at the Battle of Austerlitz and served in Germany under General Édouard Jean Baptiste Milhaud, commanding the 22nd Chasseurs-à-Cheval Regiment, part of Marshal Joachim Murat's Reserve Cavalry Corps; shortly afterwards, on 24 December 1805, he was appointed Brigadier-General.

He then served in the War of the Fourth Coalition during the Prussia and Poland campaigns, and fought at Jena. He was then seconded to the 3rd Dragoon Division under General Carrière de Beaumont's command. He was promoted Général de division on 14 May 1807 and commanded the 1st Dragoon Division at the Battle of Heilsberg; he suffered battle wounds at Friedland, where his division was supporting the right flank of Marshal Victor's I Corps.

== Spain and Russia ==
In 1808, de Faÿ commanded the cavalry of the Armée du Midi under Marshals Jean-Baptiste Bessières, Claude Victor and Jean de Dieu Soult in the Spanish Peninsular War. He served at the Fall of Madrid, and at the battles of Uclés, Cuenca, Medellín, Talavera, Ocana, Gebora, Albuquerque, Albuera, Usagre, Elvas, being wounded at Villafranca; one of his dispatches was intercepted and deciphered by the British.

In May 1808, de Faÿ was created a Baron de l'Empire in addition to his ancient family titles: they were Counts of Coisse in France.

Baron de Faÿ de La Tour-Maubourg was appointed General commanding the IV Cavalry Corps for Napoleon's March on Moscow. He was wounded at the Battle of Borodino, was noted for his distinguished and gallant service at Mozhaysk leading France's Sacred Squadron, and having survived the retreat, later commanded the I Cavalry Corps at Bautzen, Reichenbach Goldberg, Lutzen, and Dresden.

At Wachau, during the Battle of Leipzig, Baron de Faÿ's 1st Cavalry Corps along with François Étienne de Kellermann's 3rd Cavalry Corps and the Empress' Dragoons charged the center of Eugen von Württemberg's line; the Duke of Württemberg's Imperial Russian Guards then counter-attacked, stabilizing their position. He lost a leg from the knee, famously stating when his valet wept upon sight of his injury: "What are you crying about, man, you have one less boot to polish".

The amputation was administered by the celebrated French Army surgeon, Baron Dominique-Jean Larrey, who noted in his memoirs:

"he [de Faÿ] was hit by a small caliber ball which smashed his right knee to pieces, a serious wound which required amputation below the thigh, requested by the casualty himself: I immediately practised it under enemy fire. It was completed in less than three minutes".

== Restoration of the Monarchy ==
With the restoration of the Bourbons he swore allegiance to Louis XVIII and his loyalty to the king during the Hundred Days was rewarded by being created a Pair de France, 1814 and advanced as Marquis in 1817.

De Faÿ served in several diplomatic posts, including appointment as Ambassador to London in 1819, where he corresponded with Lord Castlereagh. He was briefly Minister of War (November 1819 – December 1821), and Governor of Les Invalides (December 1821), as well as sitting on the Tribunal which sentenced the French Marshal Prince Michel Ney to death.

In August 1831, he commenced negotiations with the Belgians (his wife's family was Flemish) regarding frontier forts, before the British intervened.

== Honours and titles ==
Collar of the Saint-Esprit

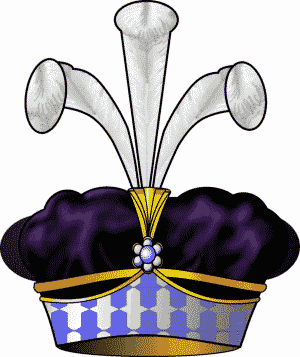
- Baron de l'Empire
- Marquis de France
- Grand-croix, Ordre de la Réunion
- Grand-croix, Légion d'honneur
- Grand-croix, Ordre de Saint-Louis
- Chevalier, Ordre de Malte
- Chevalier, Ordre du Saint-Esprit.

== See also ==
- Château de Maubourg
- Marquisate de La Tour-Maubourg
- La Tour-Maubourg (Paris Métro)
- List of Ambassadors of France to the United Kingdom

== Notes ==
Political offices
Preceded by Laurent de Gouvion, marquis de Saint-Cyr	Minister of War; 19 November 1819 – 14 December 1821	Succeeded by Claude-Victor Perrin, duc de Belluno
Preceded by Louis-Antoine de Lignaud de Lussac	Governor of the Les Invalides; December 1821 – July 1830	Succeeded by Jean-Baptiste Jourdan
