= Charles P. Fahey =

American labor leader and politician

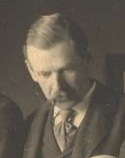

Member of the Tennessee House of Representatives

Personal details
- Born: Charles Patrick Fahey; February 1862 Nashville, Tennessee, U.S.
- Died: March 4, 1915 (aged 55) Nashville, Tennessee, U.S.
- Spouse: Kate Gorey
- Children: 1 son

Charles Patrick Fahey (February 1862 – March 4, 1915) was an American labor leader and politician. As a member of the Tennessee House of Representatives for Davidson County, he sponsored pro-labor legislation for women and children. His bills also led to the racial segregation of streetcars in Nashville, and to the requirement of a medical prescription to purchase cocaine.

== Early life ==
Fahey was born in 1862 in Nashville, Tennessee, to Irish immigrants Patrick Fahey and Katherine Ward. He was educated in St. Louis, Missouri.

== Career ==
Fahey began his career in the leather industry. He became a labor leader, first as a member or delegate of the Leatherworkers' Union, the Tennessee State Federation of Labor. He was also a delegate to the Southern Labor Congress and the American Federation of Labor.

Fahey served as a member of the Tennessee House of Representatives twice, in the 52nd and 54th general assemblies, representing Davidson County. Fahey sponsored pro-labor legislations, like "the first child labor law", "another measure reducing the hours of working women in the state", and "another bill making all stores and shops of all kind provide stools for their women employees when not busy." In 1901, he introduced Bill Number 80 to ban the informal sale of cocaine; instead it had to be purchased with a prescription from a physician. The bill passed both the state house and senate. Fahey was also in favor of racial segregation. In January 1905, he introduced Bill Number 87 "to separate white and colored passengers on streetcars." His effort was successful, and the streetcars were segregated by July of the same year.

Fahey resumed his involvement with the labor movement after leaving office. He attended at least the 30th Annual Convention in St. Louis, Missouri, in November 1910 and the 33rd Annual Convention of the AFL in Seattle, Washington, in November, 1913. In 1913, he was nominated to serve as the member of the Tennessee Senate for Davidson County, but he decided not to run. Instead, he was "closely identified with legislators in advocating laws beneficial to the workers and was recognized as an authority on all questions pertaining to labor."

== Personal life and death ==
Fahey married Kate Gorey; they had a son, who died as an infant. Fahey attended services at St. Columba Church, a Catholic church in East Nashville. They resided at 703 Main Street in Nashville, Tennessee. His wife predeceased him in 1904.

Fahey died of heart disease on March 4, 1915, in Nashville. He was buried in the Calvary Cemetery in Nashville. Shortly after his death, the Nashville Trades and Labor Council passed a resolution in his honor.
