= Warrensburg Mills Historic District =

Historic district in New York, United States

- U.S. National Register of Historic Places
- U.S. Historic district
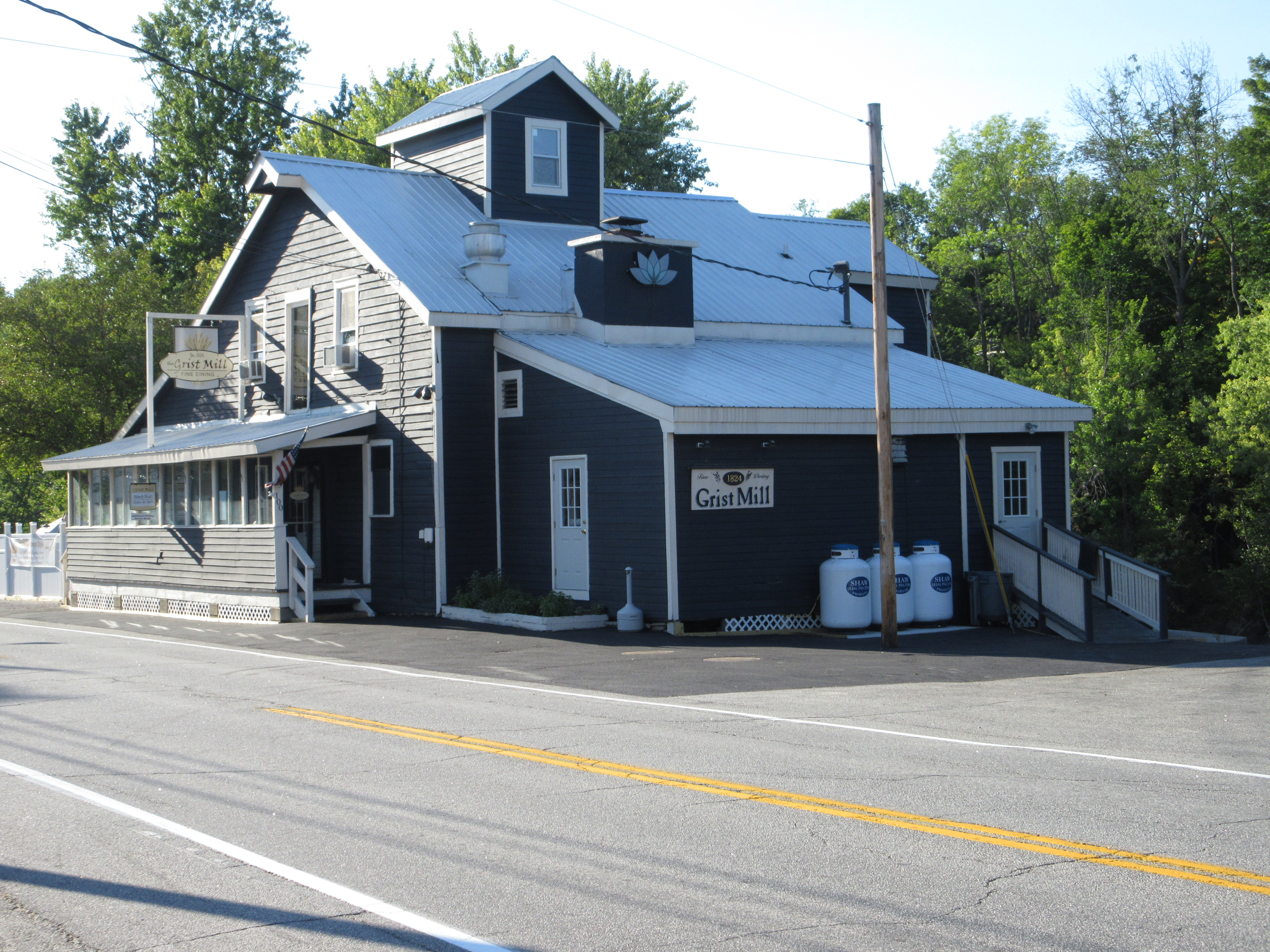
- Grist mill in Warrensburg Mills

- Location within New York Location within the United States
- Location: Roughly bounded by the Osborne and Woolen Mill bridges, Schroon River and the railroad right of way, Warrensburg, New York
- Coordinates: 43°29′21″N 73°46′31″W
- Area: 40 acres (16 ha)
- Built: 1815
- Architect: Croton Bridge Builders; Et al.
- NRHP reference No.: 75001232
- Added to NRHP: September 18, 1975

Warrensburg Mills Historic District is a national historic district located at Warrensburg, Warren County, New York. It includes 58 contributing buildings and four contributing structures. It encompasses a number of mill complexes and homes related to the development of Warrensburg. It includes a mill dam, Emerson Sawmill (ca. 1820), grist mill, early shirt factory (1878), later shirt factory (1898), office building (1855), coal storage shed (ca. 1920), grain warehouses, and 51 wood residences and one brick residence. Also within the district are the Osborne Bridge (ca. 1930), and Woolen Mill Bridge (ca. 1895, constructed by Croton Bridge Builders).

It was added to the National Register of Historic Places in 1975.

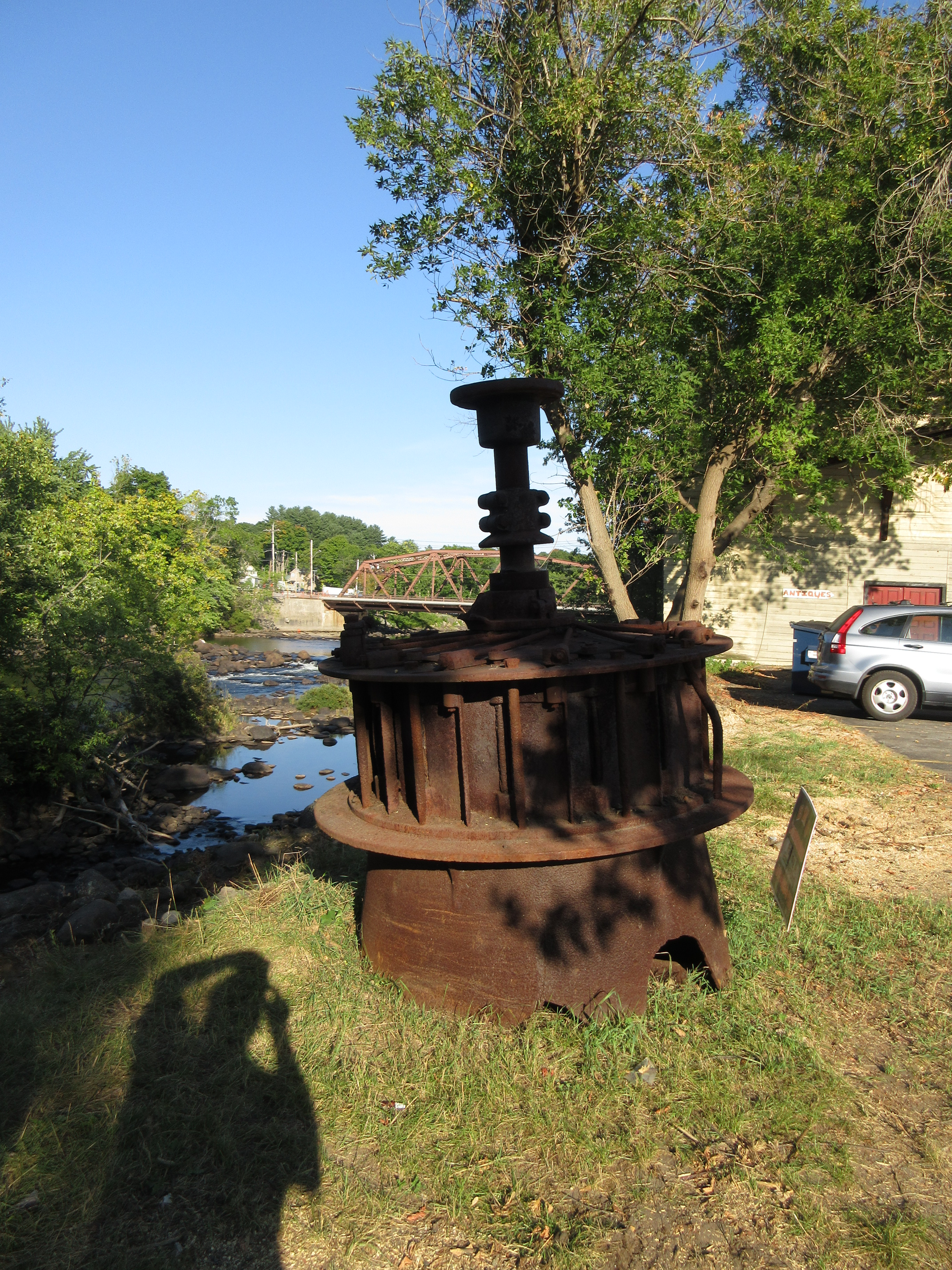

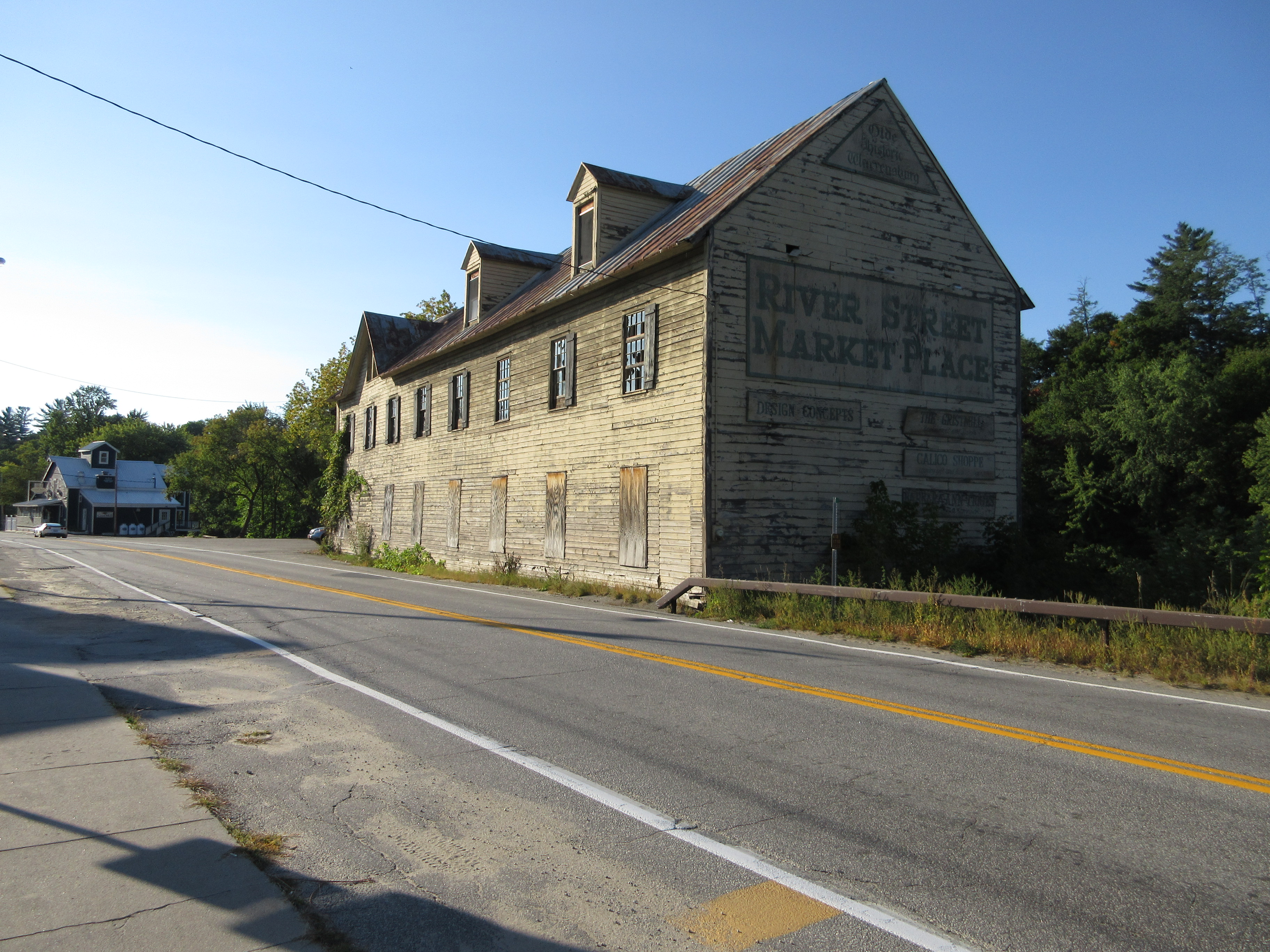

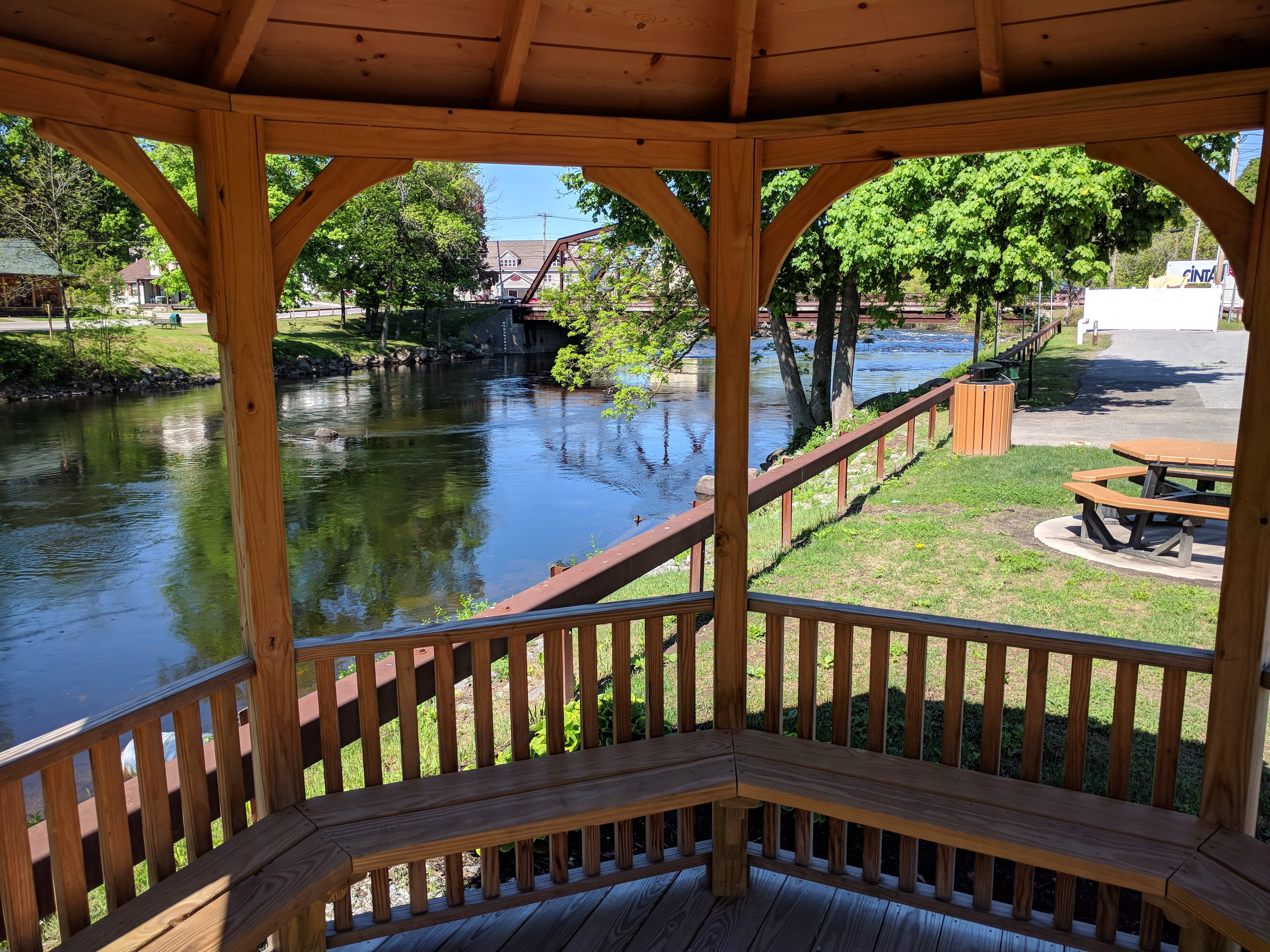
