= Ó Fiaich =

Ó Fiaich was the surname of a Gaelic-Irish erenagh and Brehon family from County Fermanagh. The Ó Fiaich family were of the Cenél nEógain. It is anglicized as Fee, Fye, Fay, and Foy.

- Diarmait O Fiaich, abbot of Recles Gilla Molaise Ui Gillaurain, from Tuaim, rested in Christ and was buried at Ardcarne, 1229
- Tomás Ó Fiaich, 1923–1990, Archbishop of Armagh
