= Merrill MaGee House =

Historic house in New York, United States

- Merrill-Magee House
- U.S. National Register of Historic Places
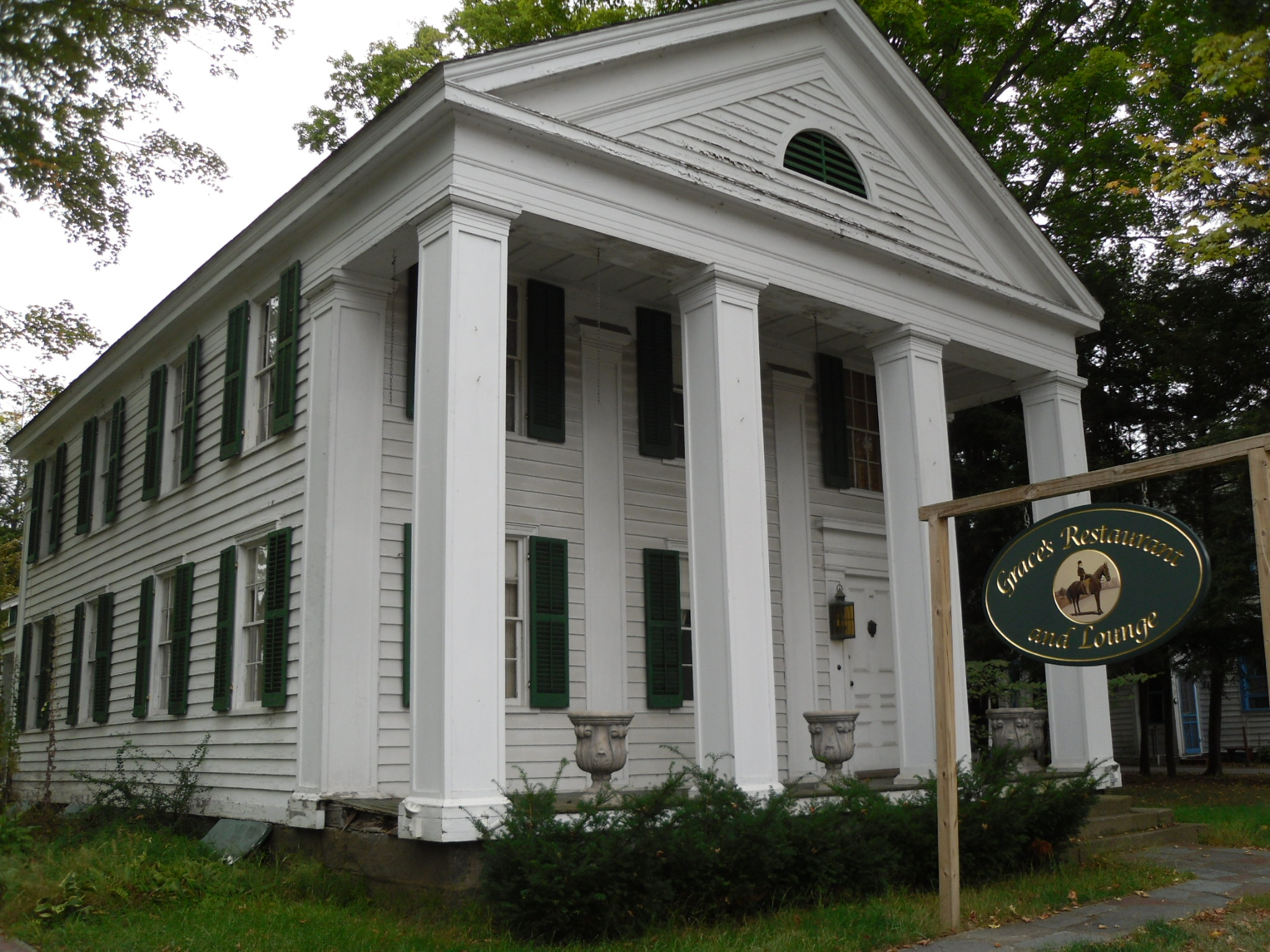
- Merrill-Magee House, August 2010

- Location within New York Location within the United States
- Location: 3 Hudson St., Warrensburg, New York
- Coordinates: 43°29′47″N 73°46′36″W
- Area: 3.6 acres (1.5 ha)
- Built: 1835
- Architectural style: Greek Revival
- NRHP reference No.: 85000728
- Added to NRHP: April 11, 1985

The Merrill-Magee House, also known as The Merrill Magee Inn, is a historic home located at Warrensburg, Warren County, New York. It was built in three phases: the original 1 1/2-story, Greek Revival–style farmhouse built about 1835; the 2-story main block with giant portico added about 1855; and the 1911 addition of a 1 1/2-story farmhouse, originally built in 1815, attached to the west end of the original dwelling. Also in 1911, a shed-roofed frame kitchen was added. Also on the property are a woodshed (c. 1890), ice house (c. 1875), smokehouse (c. 1855), carriage barn (c. 1875), garage / servant's quarters (c. 1925), swimming pool (1927–28), chicken coop (c. 1910), and the landscaping. It has been used as a restaurant and inn since the 1980s.

It was added to the National Register of Historic Places in 1985.
