= Fornell =

Fornell is a surname. Notable people with the surname include:

- Claes Fornell, Swedish business professor
- Gladys Fornell (1904-1982), American playwright
- Marc Fornell Mestres (born 1982), Spanish tennis player
- Marcus Fornell (born 1994), Swedish ice hockey player
- Teresa Borràs i Fornell (1923–2010), Spanish composer and pianist
