= Yaddo =

Artists' community in Saratoga Springs, New York

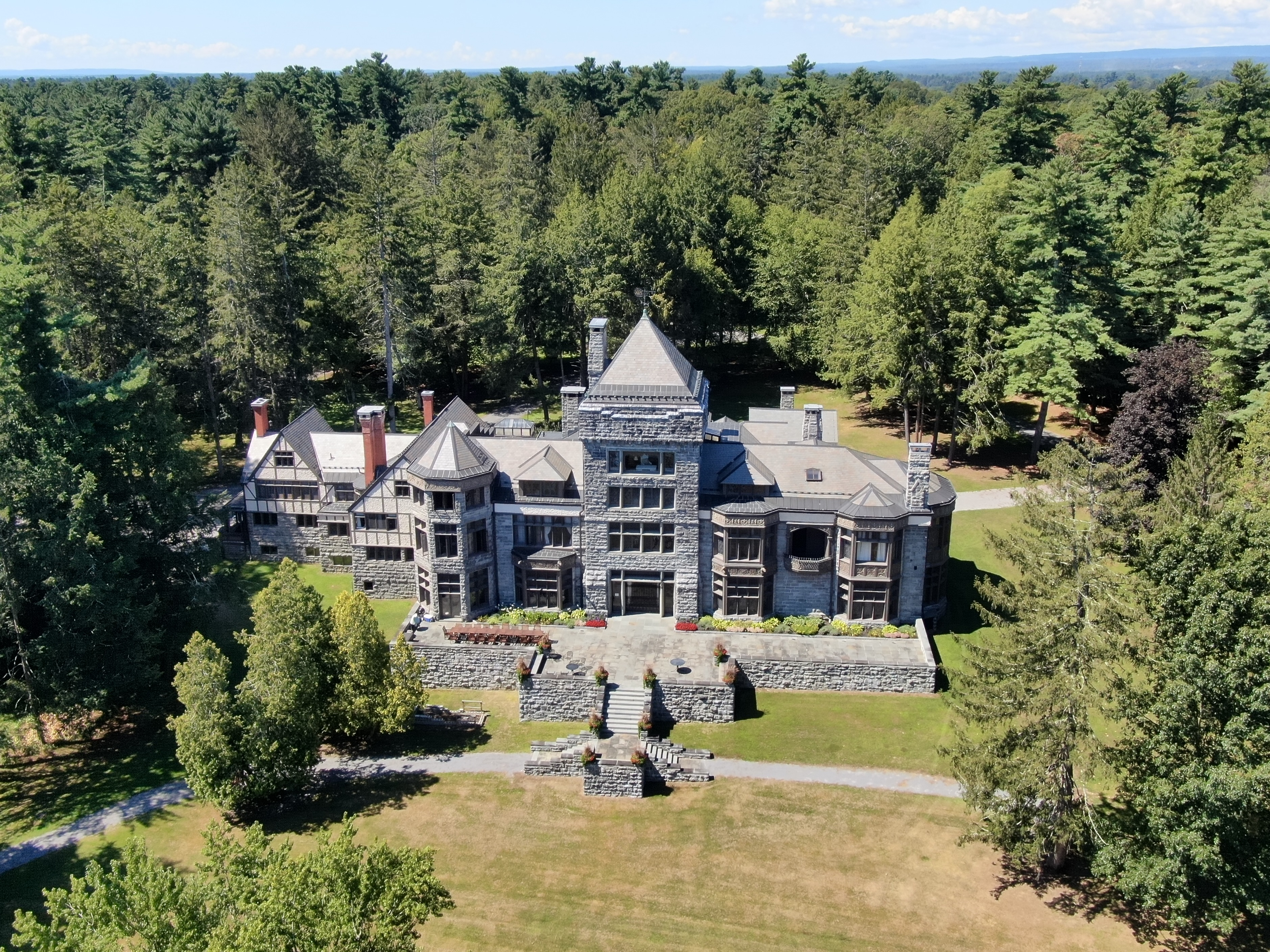
- Yaddo in 2025
- Formation: 1926
- Type: Artist colony
- Purpose: To nurture the creative process by providing an opportunity for artists to work without interruption in a supportive environment
- Headquarters: Saratoga Springs, New York
- Coordinates: 43.06848°N 73.75813°W
- Region served: United States
- Website: yaddo.org

Yaddo is an artists' community located on a 400-acre (160-hectare) estate in Saratoga Springs, New York. Its mission is "to nurture the creative process by providing an opportunity for artists to work without interruption in a supportive environment." On March 11, 2013, it was designated a National Historic Landmark.

It offers residencies to artists working in choreography, film, literature, musical composition, painting, performance art, photography, printmaking, sculpture, and video. Collectively, artists who have worked at Yaddo have won 82 Pulitzer Prizes, 34 MacArthur Fellowships, 70 National Book Awards, 24 National Book Critics Circle Awards, 108 Rome Prizes, 49 Whiting Writers' Awards, a Nobel Prize (Saul Bellow, who won the Pulitzer Prize in Fiction and Nobel Prize in Literature in 1976), at least one Man Booker Prize (Alan Hollinghurst, 2004) and countless other honors. Yaddo is included in the Union Avenue Historic District.

== History ==
The estate was purchased in 1881 by the financier Spencer Trask and his wife, the writer Katrina Trask. The first mansion on the property burned down in 1891, and the Trasks then built the current house. Yaddo is a neologism invented by one of the Trask children and was meant to rhyme with "shadow".

=== Artists' colony ===
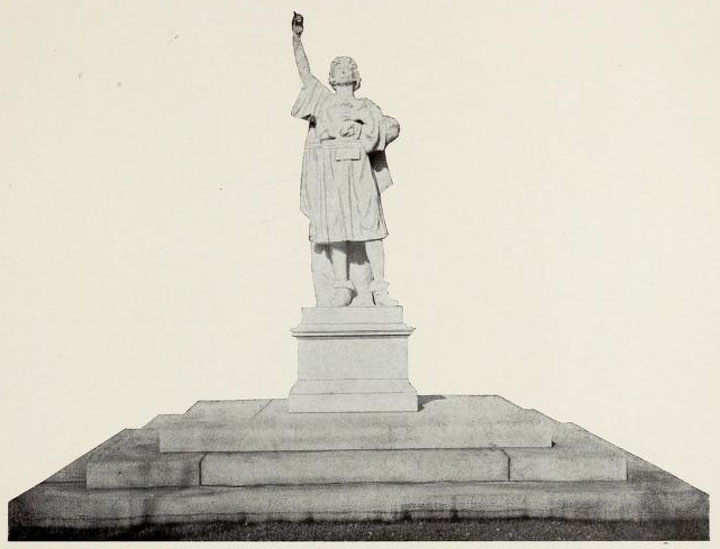
Christalan (1900), memorial to the Trasks' four children

In 1900, after the premature deaths of the Trasks' four children, Spencer Trask decided to turn the estate into an artists' retreat as a gift to his wife. He did this with the financial assistance of philanthropist George Foster Peabody. The first artists arrived in 1926. The success of Yaddo encouraged Spencer and Katrina later to donate land for a working women's retreat center as well, known as Wiawaka Holiday House, at the request of Mary Wiltsie Fuller. At least in its early years, Yaddo was funded by profits from the Bowling Green Offices Building in Manhattan, in which Spencer Trask was extensively involved.

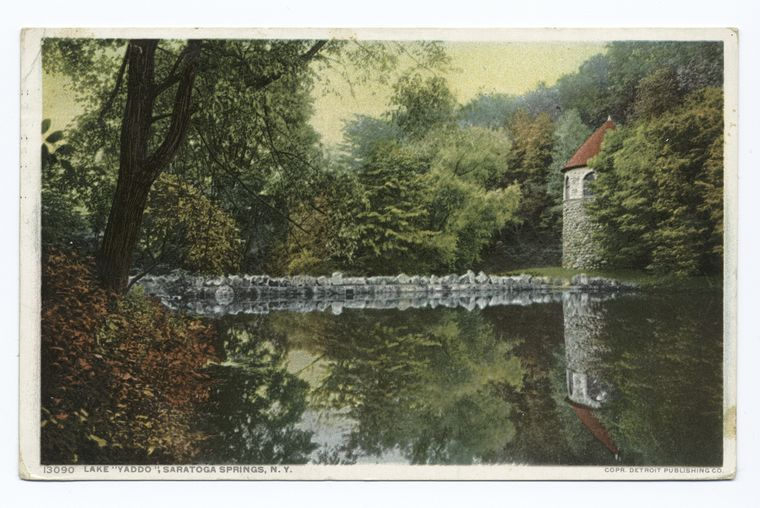
Postcard of a lake at Yaddo with the Stone Tower studio, a former chapel

In 1949 during the McCarthy Era, a news story accurately accused writer Agnes Smedley of spying for the Soviet Union. Smedley had traveled with Mao Zedong to report on the Chinese Communist Revolution and, beginning in 1943, had spent five years at Yaddo. Poet Robert Lowell pushed the Board of Directors to oust Yaddo's director, Elizabeth Ames, who was being questioned by the FBI. Ames was eventually exonerated of all charges but learned from the investigation that her assistant Mary Townsend was an FBI informant. Ames remained director until her retirement in 1969, having overseen the Yaddo community from its creation in 1924. Ames was succeeded by Newman E. Waite who served as president from 1969 until 1977 when Curtis Harnack assumed the position.

Literary critic and eventual Yaddo board member Louis Kronenberger wrote in his memoir that to call Yaddo "a mixture of some of the most attractive, enjoyable, generous-minded people and of others who were weird, megalomaniac, intransigent, pugnacious is only to say that it has housed and nourished most of the finest talents in the arts of the past forty-odd years—the immensely fruitful years of Elizabeth Ames's directorship."

=== Recent years ===
In May 2005, vandals, using paintball guns, damaged two of the Four Seasons statues, the Poet's Bench, a fountain, and pathways with blue paint. Repairs cost $1,400. In 2018, Yaddo elected photographer Peter Kayafas and novelist Janice Y. K. Lee as co-chairs of its board of directors.

Yaddo has received large contributions from Spencer Trask & Company and Kevin Kimberlin, the firm's current chairman. Novelist Patricia Highsmith bequeathed her estate, valued at $3 million, to the community.

== Facilities and gardens ==
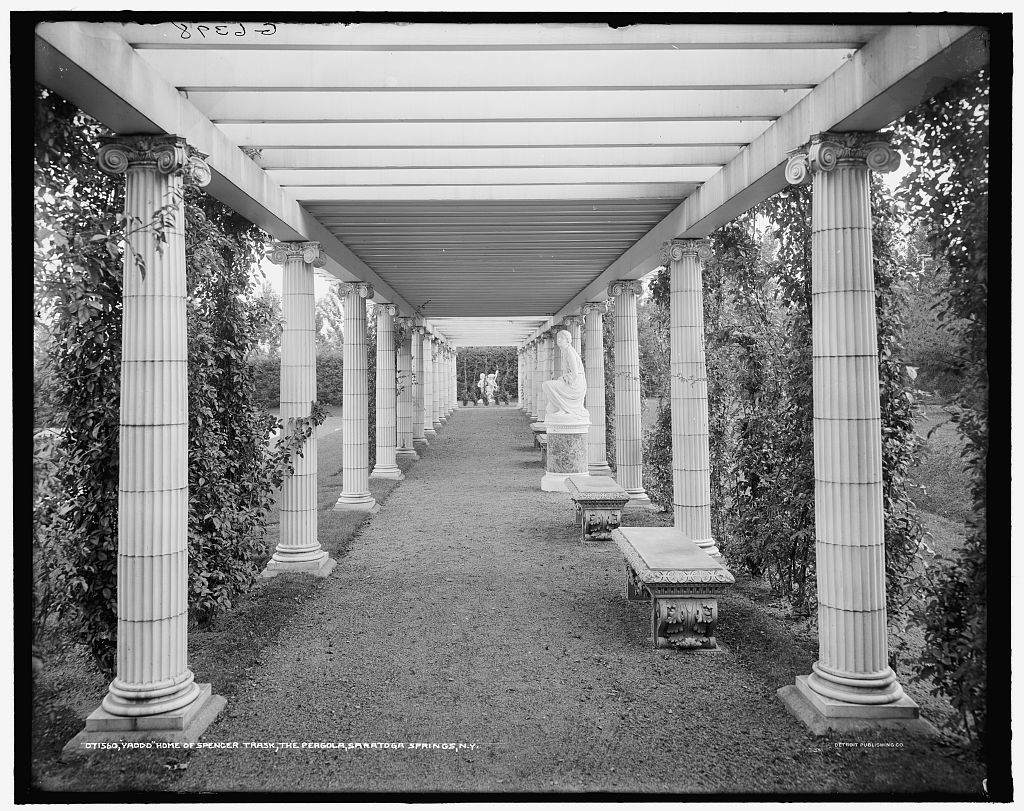
Pergola in Yaddo's gardens, photographed c. 1900–20

Yaddo's gardens are modeled after the classical Italian gardens the Trasks had visited in Europe. The Four Seasons statues were acquired and installed in the garden in 1909. There are many statues and sculptures located within the estate, including a sundial that bears the inscription, "Hours fly, Flowers die, New days, New ways, Pass by, Love stays." While visitors are not admitted to the main mansion or artists' residences, they may visit the gardens.

== Alumni artists-in-residence ==
Yaddo has hosted more than 6,000 artists including:

- Ayad Akhtar
- Hannah Arendt
- Michael Ashkin
- Newton Arvin
- Milton Avery
- Annie Baker
- James Baldwin
- Louise Belcourt
- Saul Bellow
- Leonard Bernstein
- Elizabeth Bishop
- James L. Brooks
- Sharon Butler
- Truman Capote
- Henri Cartier-Bresson
- Raymond Carver
- Jordan Casteel
- Rebecca Chace
- John Cheever
- Lisa Cholodenko
- Ta-Nehisi Coates
- Aaron Copland
- Jennifer Croft
- Roger Crossgrove
- Beauford Delaney
- Samuel R. Delany
- Joseph De Martini
- Arthur Deshaies
- Blane De St. Croix
- David Diamond
- Sari Dienes
- John Dilg
- Torkwase Dyson
- Mary Beth Edelson
- Jonathan Elliott
- Kenneth Fearing
- Gladys Fornell
- Jonathan Franzen
- Daniel Fuchs
- William Gass
- Steve Giovinco
- Keli Goff
- Jason Grote
- Philip Guston
- Daron Hagen
- Michael Harrison
- Ruth Heller
- Sabine Heinlein
- Patricia Highsmith
- Chester Himes
- Marilyn Gayle Hoff
- Langston Hughes
- Ted Hughes
- Alfred Kazin
- X. J. Kennedy
- Jeanne Jaffe
- Tamara Jenkins
- Miranda July
- Ulysses Kay
- Porochista Khakpour
- Wlodzimierz Ksiazek
- Louis Kronenberger
- Stanley Kunitz
- Penny Lane
- James Lapine
- Jacob Lawrence
- Young Jean Lee
- Alan Lelchuk
- Robert Lowell
- Grace Lumpkin
- Alison Lurie
- Carmen Maria Machado
- Kathryn Maris
- Rosemary Mahoney
- Carson McCullers
- Cassandra Medley
- Melissa Meyer
- Honor Molloy
- Robert Nozick
- Flannery O'Connor
- Dorothy Parker
- William Ordway Partridge
- Sylvia Plath
- Katherine Anne Porter
- Mario Puzo
- Carl Rakosi
- Tom Raworth
- Dee Rees
- Jason Reitman
- Esther Rolick
- Ned Rorem
- Henry Roth
- Philip Roth
- Carl Schmitt
- Sarah Schulman
- Delmore Schwartz
- Ann Loomis Silsbee
- Michael Simms
- Elizabeth Sparhawk-Jones
- Clyfford Still
- Stephanie Strickland
- Shaina Taub
- Michael Tilson Thomas
- Virgil Thomson
- Colm Tóibín
- Lionel Trilling
- Anne Truitt
- Byron Vazakas
- David Foster Wallace
- Eudora Welty
- Chloé Zhao

== In popular culture ==
Jonathan Ames' book Wake Up Sir! (2004) is partially set at Yaddo.

Dagger of the Mind (1941), a novel by 1930s Yaddo resident Kenneth Fearing, takes place in Demarest Hall, an art colony modeled after Yaddo.

In You season 1, episode 8: "You Got Me Babe", Blythe helps Beck focus on writing and break through writer's block by disconnecting Beck from her cellphone and the Internet, and setting up Beck's apartment to make her "own Yaddo".

Yaddo is mentioned repeatedly throughout the Theresa Rebeck play Seminar.

In the 2018 Netflix comedy-drama Private Life, aspiring writer Sadie (played by Kayli Carter) gets the opportunity to spend a month at Yaddo to focus on refining her writing skills. It is also repeatedly mentioned and referenced throughout the movie, e.g. by a coffee mug showing the Yaddo name on it. A few scenes of the movie are set at Yaddo's location as well.

Mentioned in the Showtime series The Affair season 2, episode 11 where Noah Solloway's agent offers to set him up at Yaddo to write his second novel.

Yaddo is mentioned in the final episode (season 7, episode 12) of Younger when Liza submits Charles’ book secretly and he is accepted. The show ends with him promoting her to move on to become a writer and accept his stay at Yaddo.

== See also ==
- List of National Historic Landmarks in New York
- National Register of Historic Places listings in Saratoga County, New York
