= American Canoe Association =

Paddle sports organization in the United States

- Formation: 1880
- Headquarters: Fredericksburg, Virginia
- Website: http://www.americancanoe.org/

The American Canoe Association (ACA) is the oldest and largest paddle sports organization in the United States, promoting canoeing, kayaking, and rafting. The ACA sponsors more than seven hundred events each year, along with safety education, instructor certification, waterway conservation and public information campaigns. There are more than four thousand ACA certified canoe and kayak instructors. More than two hundred local paddling clubs and fifty thousand individuals are members. The Association publishes the bi-monthly Paddler Magazine.

== History ==
The ACA was founded in 1880 by Scottish lawyer, John MacGregor, who had founded the British Royal Canoe Club (RCC) in 1866. In 1883, ACA Secretary Charles Neide and retired sea captain "Barnacle" Kendall paddled and sailed over three thousand miles (4,800 km) from Lake George, New York to Pensacola, Florida. The site of Neide and Kendall's launch and the formation of the American Canoe Association is located on the grounds of the Wiawaka Holiday House. In 1886 the ACA and the RCC held the first international canoe sailing regatta.

The Adirondack Museum in Blue Mountain, New York has many artifacts from the early years of the ACA.
