= Cliff Jacobson =

American canoeist, author and outdoorsman

- Born: September 20; Chicago, Illinois, United States
- Occupations: Author, outdoorsman, consultant
- Notable work: Canoeing Wild Rivers
- Spouses: Sharon Jacobson, Susanne Harings

Cliff Jacobson (born September 20, ?) is an American canoeist, author and outdoorsman. He is best known for his books on camping and canoeing.

== Early life ==
Jacobson was born in Chicago, Illinois. He started canoeing at the age of 11, in northern Michigan. In 1962, he received his bachelor's degree in forestry from Purdue University. Later, he worked as an outfitter and canoe guide for the Science Museum of Minnesota. He is also a retired teacher of environmental science at Hastings Middle School.

Jacobson was an artillery officer (2nd and 1st. Lt.) in the U.S. army from 1963 to 1965. He was stationed in Bayreuth, Germany.

In 2003, Jacobson received the Legends Of Paddling Award from the American Canoe Association. He was awarded the Distinguished Eagle Scout Award by the Boy Scouts of America in 2009. He is a member of the Outdoor Writers Association of America.

== Selected books ==
- Justin Cody's Race to Survival! ISBN 978-0-9974768-3-5
- Boundary Waters Canoe Camping ISBN 978-0-7627-7344-2
- Basic Illustrated Camping ISBN 978-1-4930-1253-4
- Basic Illustrated Canoeing ISBN 0-7627-4759-5
- Basic Illustrated Map and Compass ISBN 0-7627-4762-5
- Basic Illustrated Knots for the Outdoors ISBN 978-0-7627-4761-0
- Basic Illustrated Cooking in the Outdoors (ISBN 978-0-7627-4760-3)
- Basic Essentials of Trailside Shelters and Emergency Shelters ((ISBN 0-934802-89-0
- Basic Essentials: Solo Canoeing ((ISBN 978-0-7627-0524-5
- Outdoor Knots (ISBN 978-1-4930-4193-0)
- Canoeist's Q&A (ISBN 1-57034-055-2)
- Camping's Forgotten Skills (ISBN 0-934802-79-3)
- The Forgotten Skills video (DVD)
- Campsite Memories, True Tales from Wild Places (ISBN 0-934802-88-2)
- Canoeist's Little Book of Wisdom (ISBN 1-57034-040-4)
- Water, Water Everywhere, pub. by HACH Company, Loveland CO. (A water-quality curriculum for grades 8–12).
- Canoeing & Camping beyond the basics ISBN 978-0-7627-4018-5
- Expedition Canoeing ISBN 978-0-7627-3809-0
- Canoeing Wild Rivers ISBN 978-1-4930-0825-4
- Camping's Top Secrets ISBN 978-0-7627-8185-0
