= Spencer Trask & Co. =

American investment firm (e. 1881)

- Headquarters: Greenwich, Connecticut, United States
- Key people: Kevin Kimberlin (Chairman)
- Services: Development of advanced technology companies
- Website: spencertraskco.com

Spencer Trask & Co. was founded by Spencer Trask and George Foster Peabody as an investment firm. The company is headquartered in Greenwich, Connecticut, and funds ventures in genomics, healthcare, mobile technology and communications.

== History ==
Spencer Trask & Co. was established in 1881 by Spencer Trask, evolving from his earlier ventures, including Trask & Stone, a brokerage house founded in 1868.

Starting in the 1890s, the firm financed Thomas Edison in the development of the light bulb and the electric power systems. Trask was president of the New York Edison Company (now known as Consolidated Edison), the first electric power company, for nearly 15 years. Spencer Trask was one of the first companies to be supplied with electric lamps.

In the 1890s, Trask and George Foster Peabody lead a group of investors in financing The New York Times. The paper returned to profitability, with Adolph Ochs as publisher.

Spencer Trask & Co. also provided financing Guglielmo Marconi's Marconi Wireless company in the 1900s.

The firm provided the first funding to Myriad Genetics, a genomics diagnostics company known for sequencing the breast cancer gene, BRCA1. This work contributed to advances in genomic medicine.
