= National Armenian Relief Committee =

The National Armenian Relief Committee (1896) was formed out of the leadership given by the New York Armenian Relief Committee and became a loosely federated organization in response to the Hamidian massacres.

== Organization ==
Its executive committee included Supreme Court Justice David J. Brewer, Spencer Trask, Chauncey Depew, Dr. Leonard Woolsey Bacon, and the Reverend Frederick D. Greene, of New York. Operations centered at the Bible House in New York, and Brown Brothers in Wall Street served as treasurer. The national committee gave directions on how to form local committees and in due course such committees, some formed earlier, some later, carried on fund-raising activities in several cities.

=== Policies ===
The Committee provided literature and arranged for speakers for these affiliated committees. It suggested as effective procedures at the public meetings the reading of letters from missionaries in Armenia describing atrocities and what was being done to help the victims. But it warned against overreaching the mark.

Much harm has been done, by painting the subject in colors so black as to paralyze all effort to relieve it and even to make such an effort absurd.

— Secretary of the National Committee to a Philadelphia correspondent

It was well, the Committee advised, to introduce Armenians as speakers if they spoke briefly and did not seize the occasion to turn the meeting into one of mere protest rather than of relief. The praiseworthy zeal of some Armenians had, the national leadership warned, led to "very serious waste and complications."

=== Fundraising ===
So deeply had Armenian relief cut into the popular consciousness that in 1896, a Thanksgiving appeal was launched nationwide, and Americans from St. Paul to San Francisco to Boston gave thanks by sending money to Armenian widows and orphans of the massacres. Citizens of St. Paul boycotted buying turkey and gave their turkey money to the cause. Clara Barton prodded Americans that fall: "Unless the open hands of charity be reached out and across the access be secured, hunger and cold will gather victims by the tens of thousands and bury them like the falling leaves beneath the snow." From John D. Rockefeller to the twenty-five hundred schoolchildren in Minneapolis who collected more than seven hundred dollars, donations came in from across the nation in large and small amounts: from the Worcestor Relief Committee; the Ladies Relief Committee of Chicago; the Citizens of Milton, North Dakota; the Davenport Iowa Relief Committee. By March 1896, $95,000 was raised in New York City, in Boston $40,000, and in Philadelphia there was enough anxiety about not keeping pace with rival cities that the Philadelphia Inquirer reported that the $15,000 it had already raised was not nearly enough. By the end of the year-long drive, Americans had raised more than $300,000 in an age when a loaf of bread cost a nickel.

In early February 1896, the National Armenian Relief Committee sent $35,000 to the International Committee at Constantinople, a group composed of British consular officials, American missionaries, and other men in whom there was confidence. The next month, the committee followed up with $10,000 to the same International Committee in Constantinople. But many questioned the effectiveness of this committee and felt that American contributions ought to be dispensed by an American agency.

== Operations ==
On advice from missionaries stationed in Constantinople, the American Board of Commissioners for Foreign Missions, with headquarters in Boston, had decided early in December, 1895, that the American National Red Cross was the best possible agency for distribution, having the experience of working in the recent Russian famine of 1881. By December 1895, Clara Barton was being recruited intensely by Spencer Trask and the National Armenian Relief Committee to administer the funds through the Red Cross. In 1896, she went from the United States to Constantinople to administer the funds of the National Armenian Relief Committee.

Barton stipulated that the Red Cross would go into the field only if there was an assurance of sufficient funds and that agents in Turkey must have complete authority and not to be divided with the missionaries. With $50,000 on hand to start, Clara Barton received a standing ovation at her farewell when she said, "judge me not harshly, nor praise me unjustly, for I shall only have done all that I could. I may not meet you again, but therefore bid you good-bye."
