= Royal C. Peabody Estate =

Historic house in New York, United States

- U.S. National Register of Historic Places
- Location within New York Location within the United States
- Location: Lake Shore Dr., Lake George, New York
- Coordinates: 43°27′3″N 73°41′40″W
- Area: 5.2 acres (2.1 ha)
- Built: 1905
- Architect: Peabody, Charles S.
- Architectural style: Tudor Revival
- NRHP reference No.: 84003386
- Added to NRHP: June 21, 1984

Royal C. Peabody Estate, also known as Wikiosco ("Home of Beautiful Waters"), is a historic lakefront estate located at Lake George, Warren County, New York.

== History ==
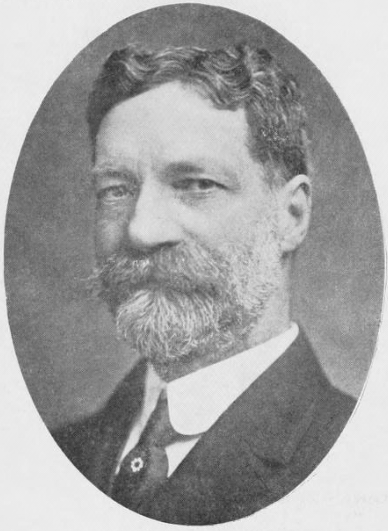
Royal C. Peabody

It was built about 1905 and is a 2 1/2-story, asymmetrical Tudor Revival–style summer residence. It is a stuccoed frame structure above a raised basement and first story sheathed in rough-cut granite. It was originally built for Royal C. Peabody, the founder of Brooklyn Edison, now part of Con Edison. He died there on September 16, 1917.

It was added to the National Register of Historic Places in 1984.
