= Wiawaka Holiday House =

- U.S. National Register of Historic Places
- U.S. Historic district
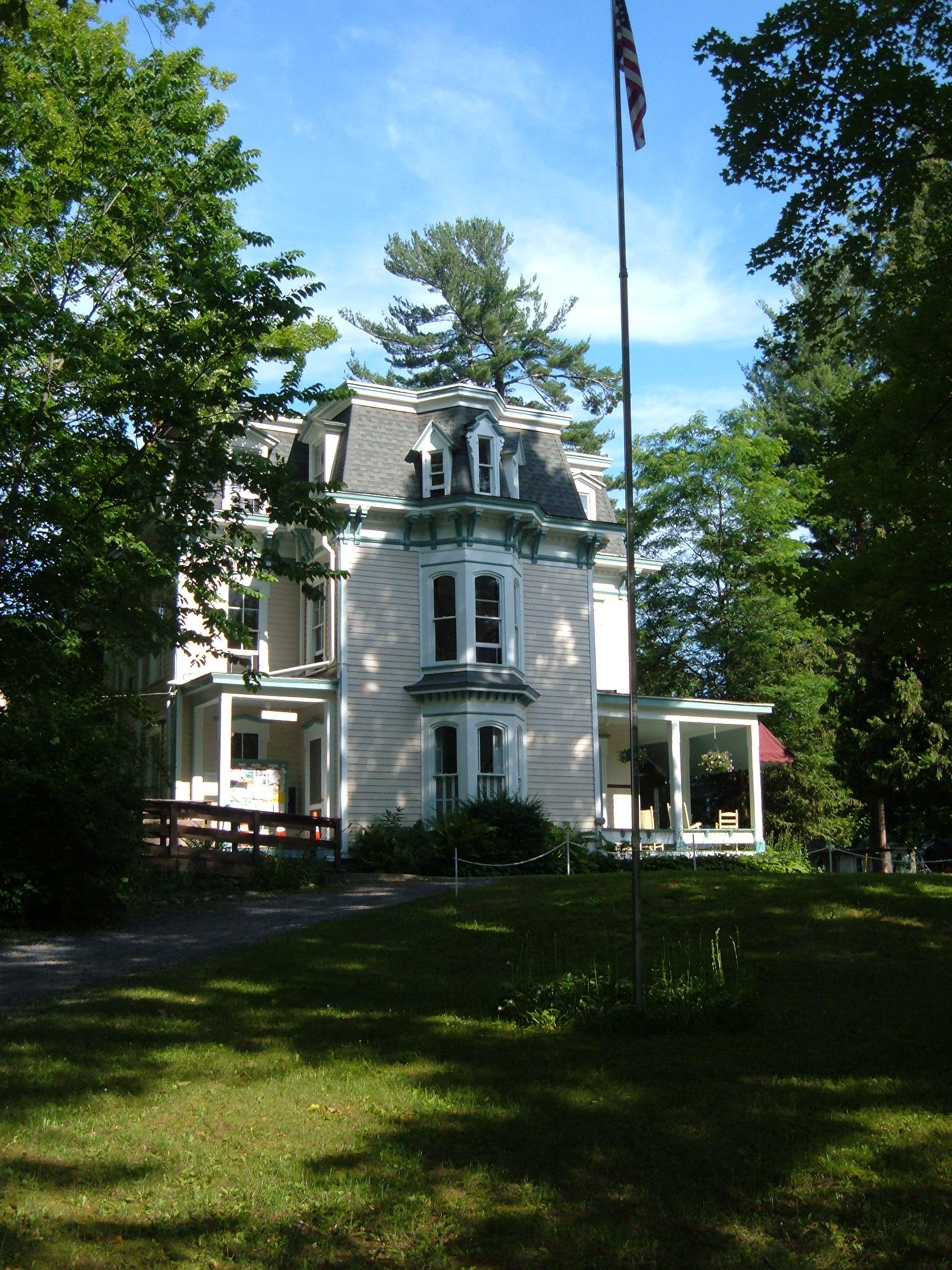
- Fuller House, July 2006

- Location within New York Location within the United States
- Location: NY route 9L, SE of Lake George, New York
- Coordinates: 43°25′26″N 73°41′28″W
- Area: 59.6 acres (24.1 ha)
- Built: 1873
- Architectural style: Second Empire, Colonial Revival, Adirondack
- NRHP reference No.: 98000874
- Added to NRHP: July 15, 1998

Wiawaka is a holiday house for women. It has lake front property on Lake George, New York. It is one of the few remaining fully operational vacation/retreat centers which arose out of the women's rights movement in the early part of the twentieth century. Founded in 1903 by Mary Wiltsie Fuller, Wiawaka provided "affordable vacations" for mainly immigrant female textile workers from Troy and Cohoes, New York, who lacked the economic means to find respite anywhere else.

Today, women of all backgrounds are welcomed at Wiawaka since it operates as a nonprofit corporation in order to continue the tradition of affordable vacations.

== Early history of the property ==
The earliest reference to the property of Wiawaka is in the tax records of the town of Caldwell (now Lake George) where it is referred to as the old "garrison ground". This suggests that military activity took place on the site which also is home to sunken bateaux, but no archeological survey has been done at Wiawaka to answer these questions.

The first private owner of the lake front property ran the United States Hotel on the site until F. G. Crosby bought the land and building in 1848. Financial difficulties caused him to lease the structure to the Lake George Young Ladies Institute in 1855 but it was shut down after only one year of operation.

Next, he enlarged the hotel, changing the name to Crosbyside, and housed several customers from cities who retreated to Lake George for a vacation in the country. With a new wave of tourism, Mr. Crosby was very successful and he soon built several Victorian cottages as lodging for his best and most loyal customers. These are Mayflower Cottage, c. 1873 and Rose Cottage, c. 1873. He also built a house for himself and his family soon after in 1876 (it was later named Fuller House). The Second Empire style residence is very little altered in its appearance today. In 1890s, Crosbyside was sold to a new owner and declined in the shadow of resorts like the bigger and more luxurious Fort William Henry Hotel.

== "The Great Spirit of Woman" over the years ==
In 1902, Katrina Trask and her husband Spencer Trask acquired the property. Spencer and Katrina Trask built Wakonda Lodge, formerly called "Amitola", in 1905 as their first experiment in a building an artists' colony before receiving artists at Yaddo. The famous artist Georgia O'Keeffe later stayed in this lodge. Katrina gradually handed over her land to her friend Mary Wiltsie Fuller who had a vision of providing retreats from the polluted city to women factory workers from Troy (known then as The Collar City). Using the original structures built by Mr. Crosby, Mary Fuller opened her retreat center in 1903 and named it Wiawaka Holiday House. Wiawaka is derived from the Abenaki word meaning "The Great Spirit of Woman". Mary proved the existence of the collective "Great Spirit" as she formed a board of women to run and look out for the interests of Wiawaka. Eventually, Wiawaka added workshops covering different skills to add an additional dimension to the guests' vacations.

== Today ==
Mary Fuller died in the 1940s, but her vision of providing vacations to hard working women continues today, although women of all socio-economic backgrounds are welcome. Wiawaka also takes pride in continuing to offer a diverse range of workshops like those held since its founding. These components combined with its historic foundation lay the cornerstones for its mission statement which follows:

"Wiawaka is a non-sectarian retreat and educational center dedicated to enriching the lives of women, and helping disadvantaged women, including but not limited to women with disabilities, economically disadvantaged women, victims of domestic abuse, the elderly, and other women in transition, to develop skills and personal resources necessary to meet the challenges they face in life. Wiawaka is steward of the preservation, maintenance and operation of its historic property."

In order to give all women the opportunity to go to Wiawaka, room and board is offered on a sliding scale according to income. All three meals are served onsite in the same communal dining room that guests have used since 1903. Today, a range of workshops are offered, all of which have been opened to the public (the calendar is easily accessible on their website). Some recent workshop topics have included creative writing, poetry readings with Yaddo poet Joan Murray, holistic healing, yoga, quilting, historical lectures, jewelry making, and tours of the historic property. Not only have workshops been opened up to the public, but Wiawaka has also begun to offer day use passes as well for those who are not overnight guests.

== Importance ==
Wiawaka is listed on the National Register of Historic Places under nine categories of significance and is listed by the National Park Service as a "Place Where Women Made History". Its place on the National Register is significant as the National Park Service holds high standards regarding the historic value of sites to which it grants this status. Its Victorian cottages, Adirondack lodge, and House of Trix (built directly over the water) are points of historic architectural interest and are listed on the register. A marker on the shore points out the location of the Wiawaka Bateaux which are also on the National Register of Historic Places.

== Gallery ==
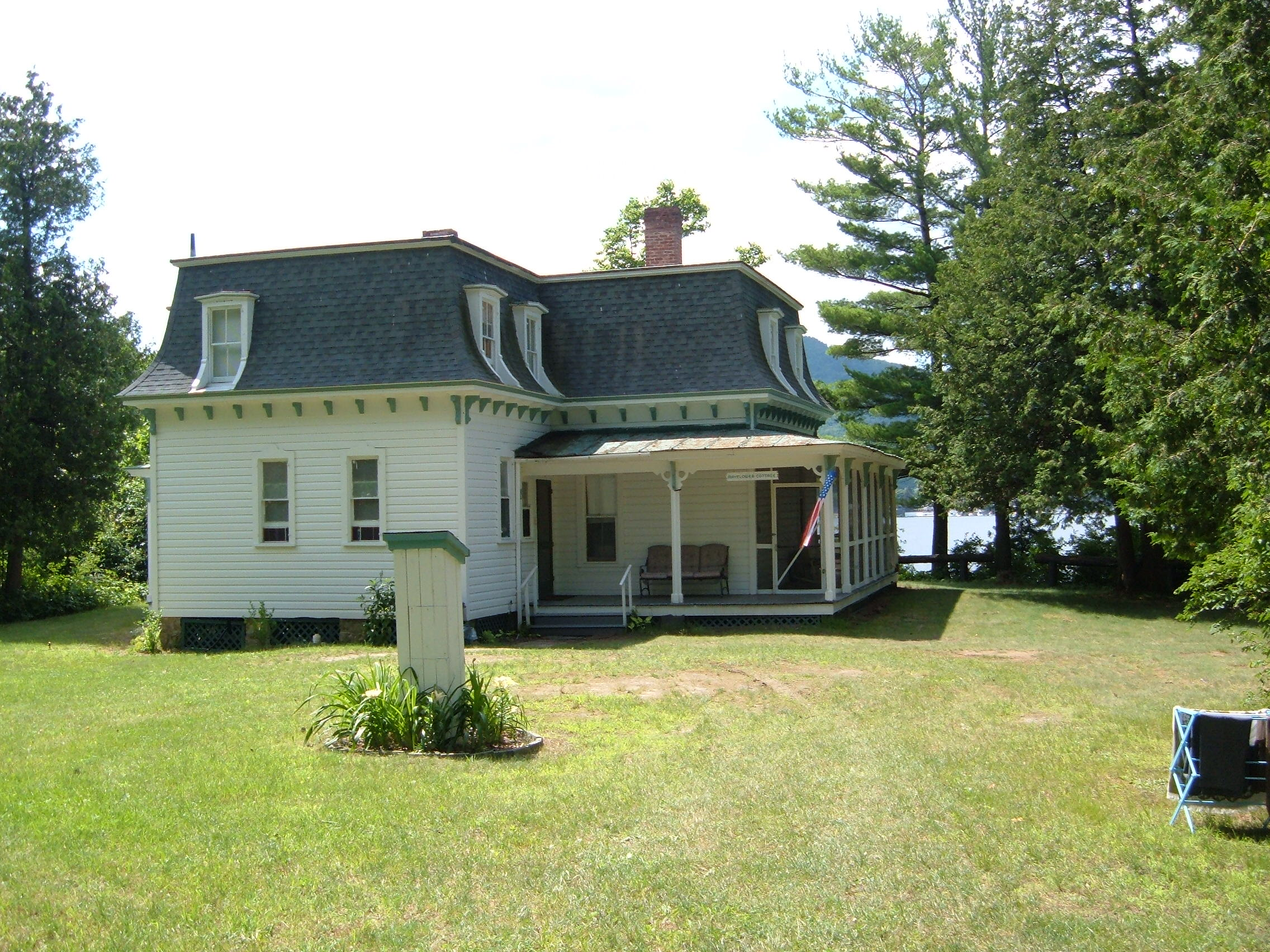
Mayflower Cottage with the lake in the background

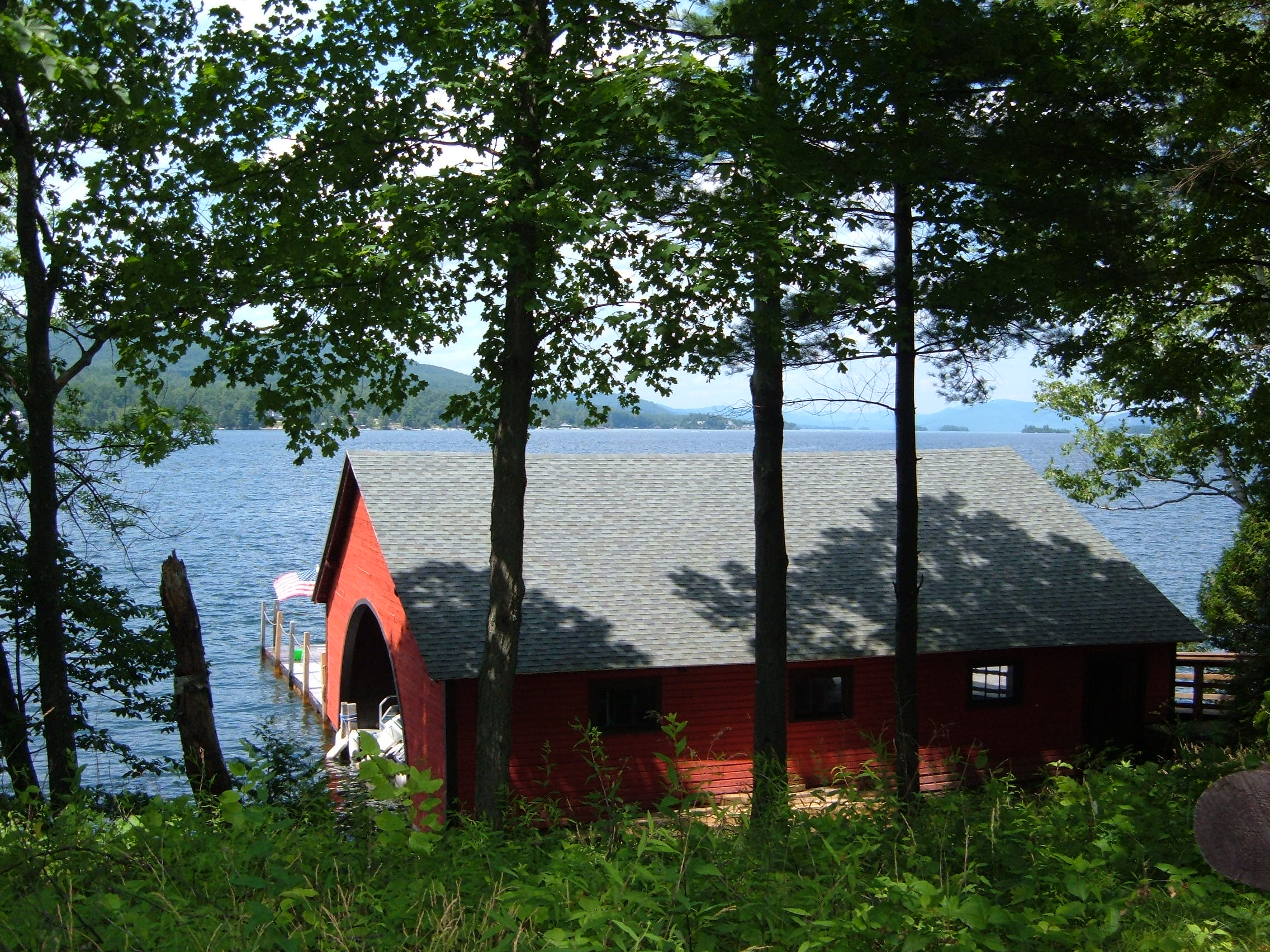
The dock and boat house on Lake George

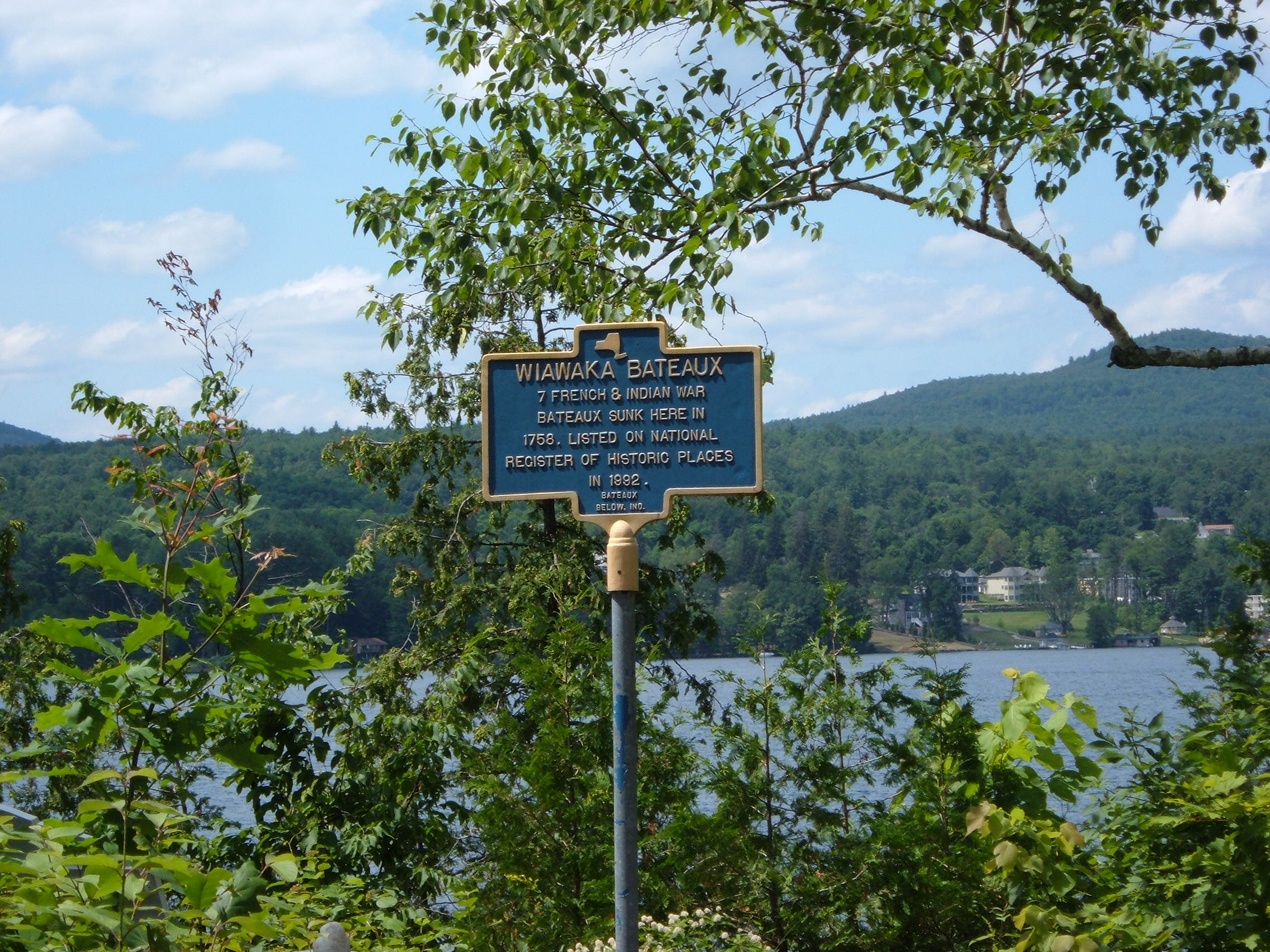
Historic Marker for Wiawaka Bateaux
