= Jeanne Jaffe =

American multidisciplinary artist known for her sculpture and installations

Jeanne Jaffe (born 1950) is an American multidisciplinary artist known for her sculpture and installations.

== Biography ==
Jaffe is Professor Emeritus of Sculpture at the University of the Arts in Philadelphia. She is also a long-term visiting professor at Xi'An Academy of Fine Arts where in fall 2017, the sculpture department established the Jeanne Faye Jaffe Studio of Sculpture workshop space, the first long-term studio for foreign experts. Jaffe also serves as the coordinator of international programming at the Jaffe Center for Book Arts at Florida Atlantic University.

Jaffe has been a recipient of fellowships and grants from the National Endowment for the Arts, including the “Challenge America” grant (a partnership with Jersey Tech Park and the Rowan University College), the Gottlieb Foundation (individual support grant), Pennsylvania Council on the Arts (sculpture fellowship), Mid/Atlantic Foundation, the Virginia A. Groot Foundation, and the Center for Emerging Artists in Philadelphia.

Her works have been domestically and internationally exhibited in museums such as the Mino Washi Museum in Mino, Japan, the Pennsylvania Academy of Art Museum in Philadelphia, the Woodmere Art Museum, James A. Michener Art Museum, Fuller Craft Museum, and the Hunterdon Art Museum. Her work is included in collections at the Pennsylvanian Academy of Fine Arts Museum, the Schein-Joseph International Museum of Ceramic Art Alfred Ceramic Art Museum at Alfred University, the Sculpture Garden at Abington Art Center, and the Zimmerli Art Museum. She has participated in artist residencies in Mino Artist Residency in Mino, Japan, Yaddo in New York state, Schuylkill Center for Environmental Education, Women's Studio Workshop, Rutgers Innovative Printmaking Workshop in New Jersey, and the Virginia Center for Creative Arts.

In 1975, Jaffe received her BFA from the Tyler School of Art at Temple University and her MFA at New York College of Ceramics at Alfred University.

== Artwork ==
Jaffe's work has been described in Sculpture Magazine as “dreamlike,” “unsettling,” absurdist, and by John Thomason of Boca Raton Magazine as having “eerie resonance.” It examines culture, history, language, and the body.

Jaffe has often been inspired by literature and history. Her three-room installation “Four Quartets,” dedicated to T.S. Eliot and his series of poems by the same name included a tableau and sculptures of headless women who dangled from the ceiling. The installation incorporated Eliot's verses and was described in Art in America as surreal and haunting. Another piece, “Alice in Dystopia,” referenced the Lewis Carroll classic, which Thomason said “receives an added jolt of contemporary decay” in the “marionette model.”

A historical reference, Jaffe featured inventor Nikola Tesla in what John Tomason of Boca Raton Magazine described as a “poetic, hallucinatory animation,” time-lapse video, “Tesla’s Dream.” Jaffe went on to create a technological installation of Tesla through an NEA-funded partnership with Jersey Tech Park and Rowan University College of Engineering. Another installation, “Field of Forms,” includes 23 bronze statues on steel poles which were inserted in the ground of the campus at the State University of New York at New Paltz.
