= Sabine Heinlein =

German American nonfiction writer (born 1973)

Sabine Heinlein (born 1973) is a German American nonfiction writer and quilter. She is the author of the literary nonfiction book Among Murderers: Life After Prison (University of California Press, 2013) and the investigative book The Orphan Zoo: The Rise and Fall of the Farm at Creedmoor Psychiatric Center (Thought Catalog, 2015 and 2023). Heinlein's essays, investigative work, and literary nonfiction have appeared in The Guardian, The New York Times, The Paris Review, Psychology Today, The Iowa Review, and many other publications. Her work has been widely anthologized. She was also the senior staff writer at Wirecutter, the product recommendation site of the New York Times.

== Early life and education ==
Heinlein grew up in Baiersdorf, a small village close to Nuremberg in northern Bavaria. She moved to Hamburg, Germany after high school. There, she earned a master's degree in art history from Universität Hamburg. After graduation she immigrated to New York City, where she earned a master's in journalism from New York University. She resides in Queens, NY with her husband.

== Publications ==
=== Magazines and newspapers ===
Heinlein's journalism tackles a wide variety of issues, including homelessness, family dynamics, the death penalty, murder, and incarceration, mental illness, drug addiction, suicide, and the Jewish history of her home town. In her essays, which are part humorous and part gloomy, she reflects on her friendship with prisoners, her love for rabbits, her fear of clowns, her decision to stay childless, and her encounters with Oliver Sacks, among other things.

=== Books ===
Heinlein is the author of Among Murderers: Life After Prison (University of California Press, 2013). The book follows three convicted murderers who spent decades in prison as they try to reintegrate into society over the course of two years. On the book's inside flap, David Samuels described Heinlein and her work as follows: "With this unsentimental yet deeply empathetic look at the lives of ex-cons struggling to make it on the outside, Sabine Heinlein establishes herself as the Orwell of rehabilitation, American-style." Kirkus Review called the book "A deeply compassionate book that poses urgent questions about the end product of imprisonment and the social thirst for vengeance." The Times Higher Education stated "This book is more than a tribute to the men interviewed: it asks us to test ourselves on our capacity for forgiveness and then to consider penal power's capacity to destroy the self."

For her book The Orphan Zoo: The Rise and Fall of the Farm at Creedmoor Psychiatric Center (Thought Catalog, 2015) Heinlein spent a year shadowing a group of inpatients and their therapist. The Orphan Zoo recounts the group's fruitless attempts to save the "Farm," a dysfunctional rehabilitation program at the notorious Creedmoor Psychiatric Center, while struggling with paranoia and hoarding.

== Awards, fellowships, and residencies ==
Heinlein's book Among Murderers: Life After Prison received a gold medal from the Independent Publishers Award. Her work has been supported by numerous residency programs and fellowships, including the New York Foundation for the Arts, Yaddo, MacDowell, the Hambidge residency, The King & Spalding Distinguished Fellowship, and the Blue Mountain Center. Heinlein has also received a Richard J. Margolis Award for social justice reporting and a Pushcart Prize.

== Anthologies ==
- Karlheinz Wohler (editor), Erlebniswelten. Herstellung und Nutzung touristischer Welten. Lit Verlag, 2005.
- Theodore Hamm, William Cole (editors): Pieces of a Decade: Brooklyn Rail Nonfiction 2000–2010, The Brooklyn Rail & Black Square Editions, 2010.
- Bill Henderson (et al., editor), The Pushcart Prize XXXVIII: Best of the Small Presses, 2014
- My Last White Boyfriend and Other Epiphanies, Ristretto Books, 2022

== Quilts ==
Heinlein is also a quilter. Her quilts mostly feature frolicking animals who often retaliate against humans. In 2020 and 2021, she created a pandemic quilt series, which includes a Zoonotic Disease Quilt, a quilted 10 Plagues book, and an Egyptian Coffin quilt.

Roslyn Bernstein writes in Guernica, "Journalistic writing required Heinlein to be precise, but, inspired by Gee's Bend quilters in rural Alabama, and by Harriet Powers, a Black quilter from the late 19th century, Heinlein feels the freedom to be imperfect when stitching her quilts." Heinlein's textile art, which is made from recycled textiles, has been exhibited nationally, including at the Annmarie Sculpture Garden & Art Center, at Field Projects, and at Pollack Gallery at Monmouth University.
