= Spencer Trask =

American financier, philanthropist (1844–1909)

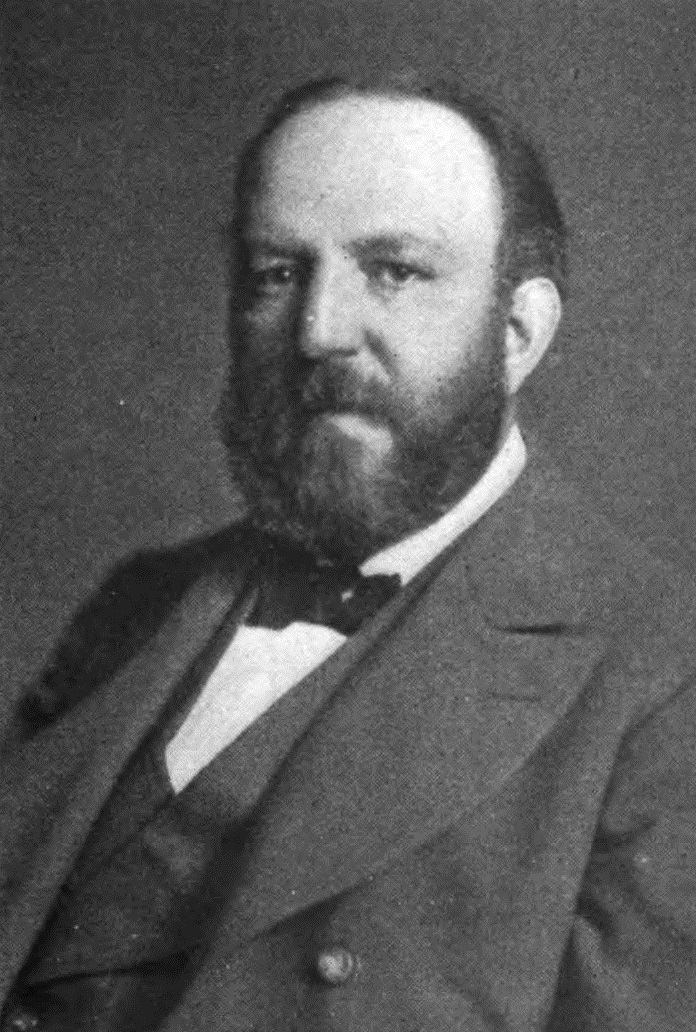
- Born: September 18, 1844; Brooklyn, New York, U.S.
- Died: December 31, 1909 (aged 65); Croton, New York, U.S.
- Occupations: Financier, philanthropist
- Spouse: Katrina Nichols (m. 1874)
- Children: 4

Signature
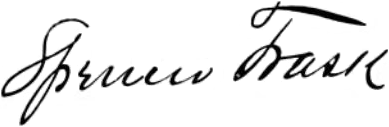

Spencer Trask (September 18, 1844 – December 31, 1909) was an American financier, philanthropist, and venture capitalist. Beginning in the 1870s, Trask began investing and supporting entrepreneurs, including Thomas Edison's commercial production of the electric light bulb and his electricity network. In 1896 he reorganized The New York Times, becoming its majority shareholder and chairman.

Along with his financial acumen, Trask was a generous philanthropist, a leading patron of the arts, a strong supporter of education, and a champion of humanitarian causes. His gifts to his alma mater, Princeton University, set a lecture series in his name that still continues to this day. He was also an initial trustee of the Teachers' College (now Teachers College, Columbia University) and St. Stephen's College (now Bard College).

== Spencer Trask & Co. ==
=== Biography ===
Spencer Trask was born in 1844 to Alanson and Sarah (Marquand) Trask in Brooklyn, New York. His father was a direct descendant of Captain William Trask, a leader in the formation of the Massachusetts Bay Colony. After completing a course at New York University Tandon School of Engineering (then Brooklyn Polytechnic Institute) and then going to and graduating from Princeton University in 1866, Spencer Trask joined his uncle to form the investment firm Trask & Brown, which became Spencer Trask & Company in 1881. Trask was married in 1874 to Katrina Nichols, an author.

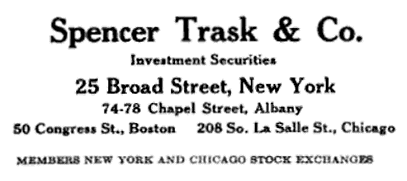
Spencer Trask & Co. letterhead c. 1917

Trask was often a supporter of new inventions in their experimental stages, having formed an early appreciation for the connection between technology, business and finance during his time at Polytechnic University in Brooklyn. He foresaw the potential of inventions such as the Marconi wireless telegraph, the telephone, the phonograph, the trolley car, and the automobile; "to all of these he gave of his time, his money and his judgment, to aid in their development."

Thomas Edison, inventor of the light bulb, was financed and supported by Trask. For over 14 years he was president of the New York Edison Company, the world's first electric power company. The company became known as Consolidated Edison. Trask was an original trustee of the Edison Electric Light Company, the predecessor to the General Electric Company, being for many years a member of the executive committee.

In 1896, Adolph S. Ochs was introduced to Trask by John Moody. Trask and his partner, George Foster Peabody, were leaders of an investment group that had recently bought The New York Times, thus averting its bankruptcy. Trask made Ochs publisher and himself chairman as The New York Times was reborn. John Moody began statistical work at Spencer Trask before launching Moody's Investors Service.

== Philanthropy ==
Trask was committed to civic duty, public service, and philanthropy.

=== Arts ===
Trask was dedicated to the arts. In his lifetime he was president of the National Arts Club, a patron and member of the Municipal Art Society of New York, and the Metropolitan Museum of Art. At the time of his death, Trask's wealth had been greatly diminished by his own generosity.

=== Yaddo ===
With no close heirs, the Trasks began to entertain the idea of turning their 400-acre (1.6 km^{2}), Saratoga Springs, New York estate into a working community of artists and writers. Twelve years after Spencer's death, Mrs. Trask married George Foster Peabody, and launched the Corporation of Yaddo. This artist community has operated continuously ever since. Yaddo, the name of the estate, is said to have been coined by the Trask's young daughter Christina, who amused her father by her mispronunciation of the numerous dark spots on the lawn caused by the towering trees' shadows.

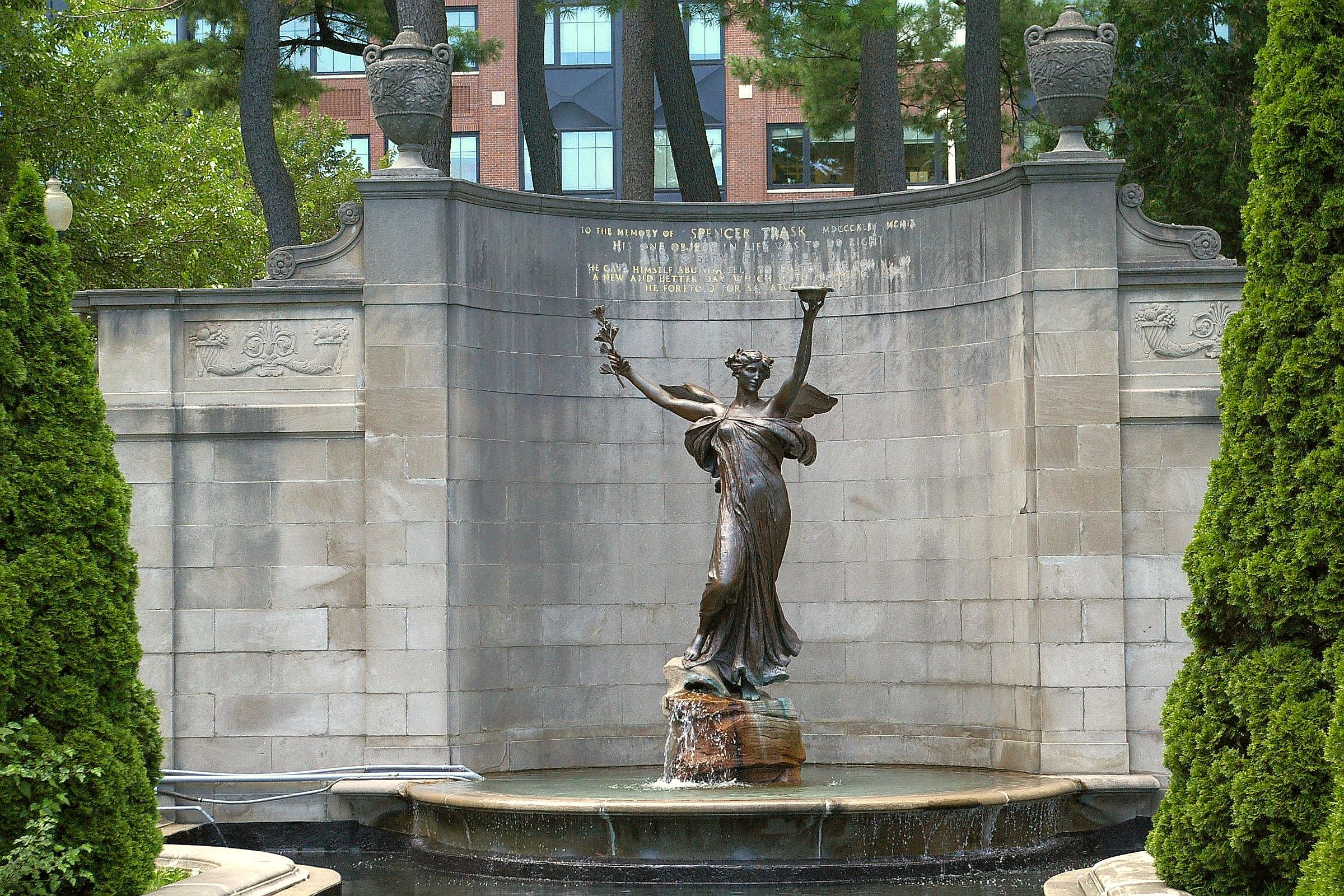
The Spirit of Life

The results of the Trasks' legacy have been historic. John Cheever once wrote that the "forty or so acres on which the principal buildings of Yaddo stand have seen more distinguished activity in the arts than any other piece of ground in the English-speaking community and perhaps the world". Collectively, artists who worked at Yaddo have won 88 Pulitzer Prizes, 72 National Book Awards, 22 National Book Critics Circle Award, 11 Oscars, a Nobel Prize, and countless other honors. Many books by Yaddo authors have been made into films. Visitors from Cheever's Day include Milton Avery, James Baldwin, Leonard Bernstein, Truman Capote, Aaron Copland, Philip Guston, Patricia Highsmith, Langston Hughes, Ted Hughes, Alfred Kazin, Ulysses Kay, Jacob Lawrence, Flannery O'Connor, Sylvia Plath, Katherine Anne Porter, Mario Puzo, Clyfford Still, and Virgil Thomson.

=== Education ===
Spencer Trask was a founder and chairman of the board of trustees for Teachers College, the school of pedagogy of Columbia University. He was also actively interested in the Kindergarten Association, and for many years was closely identified with General Theological Seminary.

Trask also founded a public lecture series at his alma mater, Princeton University in 1891, "for the purpose of securing the services of eminent men to deliver public lectures before the University on subjects of special interest". Over the years, lecturers have included Niels Bohr on "The Structure of the Atom" (1923–1924); Arnold J. Toynbee on "Near Eastern Affairs" (1925–1926); T. S. Eliot on "The Bible and English Literature", (1932–1933); Bertrand Russell on "Mind and Matter" (1950–1951); and Margaret Mead on "Changing American Character" (1975–1976).

=== National Armenian Relief Committee ===
In the 1890s, Trask led what some have called "the first international human rights movement in American history" in response to the Hamidian massacres. In New York what began as a local committee to aid the Armenians grew quickly into the National Armenian Relief Committee. Its board included some of the most powerful men in the United States, including Supreme Court Justice David Josiah Brewer, railroad executive Chauncey Depew, Wall Street banker Jacob Schiff, and church leaders Dr. Leonard Woolsey Bacon and the Reverend Fredrick D. Greene. The Relief Committee recruited Clara Barton to take Red Cross relief teams out of the country for the first time, to the Armenian provinces.

By the end of the year-long drive, Americans raised more than $300,000. In 1896, a Thanksgiving appeal was launched nationwide, and Americans from St. Paul to San Francisco to Boston gave thanks by sending money to Armenian widows and orphans of the massacres. Citizens of St. Paul boycotted buying turkey and gave their Thanksgiving food money to the cause.

=== Other organizations ===
Throughout his life, Trask took a prominent part in municipal reform and local politics, especially in connection with the Gold Democrats. He was a member of the Union League, Grolier Club, and as first treasurer, purchased the Gramercy Park property for the National Arts Club of New York.

The success of Yaddo encouraged Spencer and Katrina to later donate land for a working women's retreat center as well, known as the Wiawaka Holiday House.

Trask died in a train accident on New Year's Eve in 1909. In commemoration of his life, Daniel Chester French was commissioned to create a statue for Spencer Trask. At a memorial service in Congress Park, The Spirit of Life was unveiled.
