= Forward shipwreck site =

Coordinates: 43°27′30.3″N 73°40′16.2″W

- FORWARD shipwreck site (motor launch)
- U.S. National Register of Historic Places
- Location within New York
- Nearest city: Lake George, New York
- Built: 1906
- Architect: Gas Engine & Power Co. and Charles L. Seabury & Co., Consolidated; Morris Heights, Bronx, New York City, New York
- NRHP reference No.: 08001082
- Added to NRHP: November 21, 2008

The shipwreck site of the motor launch Forward is located in Lake George, New York approximately three and one half miles north of the village of Lake George. The motor launch was built in 1906 by Gas Engine & Power Co. and Charles L. Seabury & Co., Consolidated (Morris Heights, New York City, New York). It was one of the first gasoline-powered vessels on Lake George. The original owner was William K. Bixby.

It is the 21st property listed as a featured property of the week in a program of the National Park Service that began in July, 2008.
