= George Foster Peabody =

American businessman and philanthropist (1852–1938)

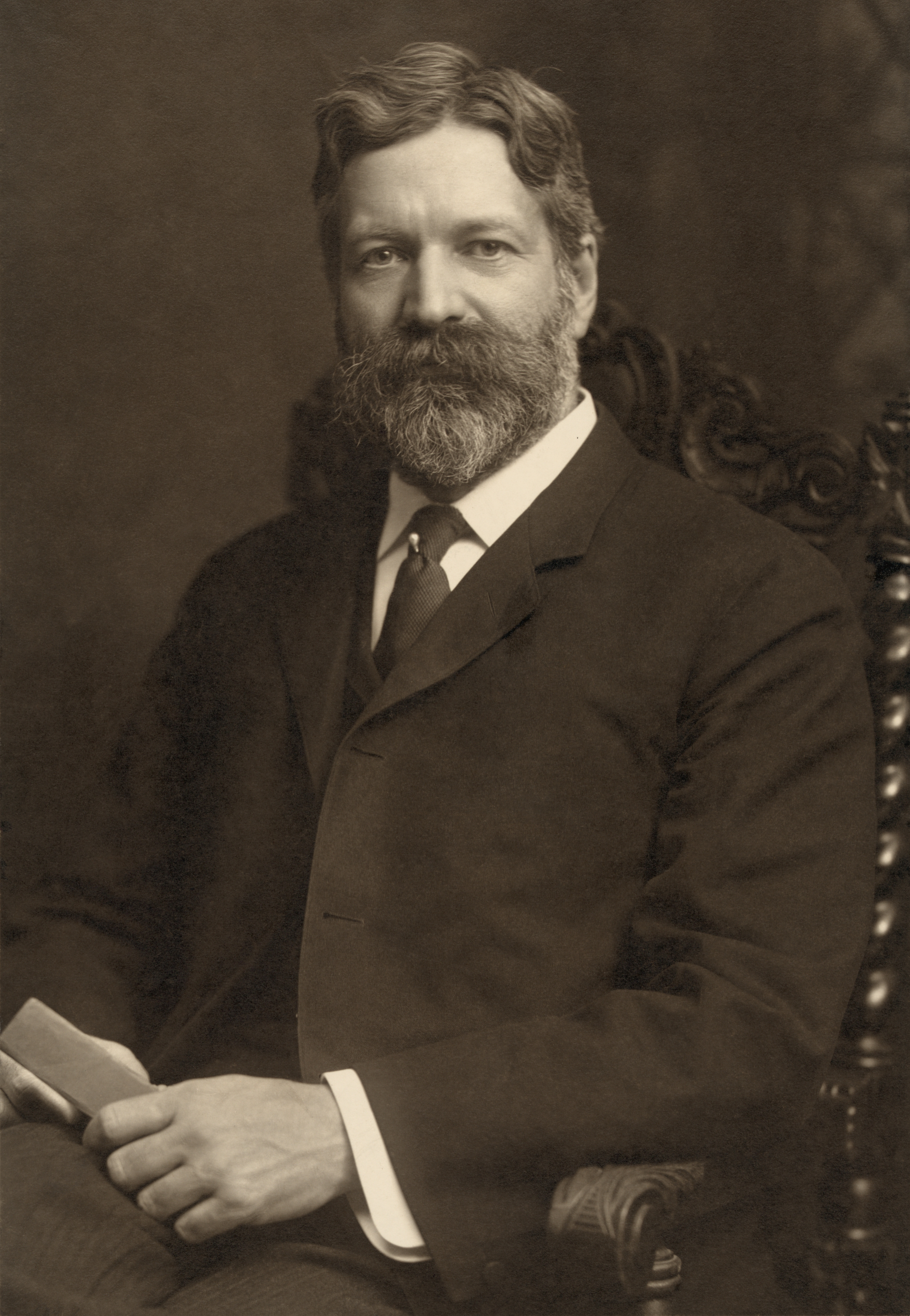
- Peabody, c. 1907
- Born: July 27, 1852; Columbus, Georgia, U.S.
- Died: March 4, 1938 (aged 85); Warm Springs, Georgia, U.S.
- Occupations: Banker; philanthropist
- Known for: Namesake of the Peabody Awards
- Title: Co-founder of Spencer Trask Co.; Deputy Chairman of Federal Reserve Bank of New York; Treasurer of the Democratic National Committee; Co-founder and Treasurer of the General Education Board; Co-founder and Treasurer of the Southern Education Board; Co-founder and Treasurer of the Anna T. Jeanes Foundation; President of the Mens League for Woman Suffrage; Director of General Electric; Co-founder of the Combustion Engineering Corporation; Second Vice President of the Edison Electric Illuminating Co.; Chairman of the Broadway Realty Co.; Vice President of the Denver and Rio Grande Western Railway Co.; Vice President of the Colorado Midland Railway Co.; Chairman of the St. Louis, Alton and Terre Haute Railroad Co.; Chairman of the New York and Ottawa Railroad Co.; President of the Potosi & Rio Verde Railroad Co.; Vice President of the American Forestry Association
- Political party: Democratic
- Spouse: Katrina Nichols Trask (m. 1921; died 1922)
- Children: 1 (adopted)

George Foster Peabody (/ˈpiːbɒdi/; July 27, 1852 – March 4, 1938) was an American businessman, activist, and philanthropist.

== Biography ==
=== Early life and education ===
He was born to George Henry Peabody and Elvira Peabody (née Canfield) as the first of four children. Both parents were New Englanders of colonial ancestry. George Henry Peabody, who came from a line of merchants, bankers and professional men, had moved from Connecticut to Columbus, Georgia, where he ran a prosperous general store. After attending private school in Columbus, young Peabody spent a few months at Deer Hill Institute in Danbury, Connecticut.

The Civil War, however, impoverished his family, and in 1866 they moved to Brooklyn, New York, and young Peabody went to work as an errand boy.

=== Business career ===
In the evenings Peabody read extensively at the library of the Brooklyn YMCA, which he later called his "alma mater". He also took part in the activities of the Reformed Church in Brooklyn Heights, where he met and became good friends with young investment banker Spencer Trask. On May 2, 1881, Peabody became a partner in the new firm of Spencer Trask & Company. During the 1880s and 1890s this investment house took a leading part in financing electric lighting corporations, beet sugar and other industrial enterprises, and railroad construction in the western United States and Mexico. Peabody himself handled most of the firm's railroad investments, working in close association with William J. Palmer. He also became a director in numerous corporations. Peabody, his brother Charles Jones Peabody and Spencer Trask amassed a great portion of their wealth from the Edison Electric Company. Trask served as president of Edison Electric Illuminating, and when J. P. Morgan—protégé of New England businessman/philanthropist George Peabody—financier of Edison Electric, merged all into the General Electric Company in 1892, George Foster Peabody became a member of the GE board of directors. Peabody had investments in Mexico, particularly in railways, along with many other U.S. financiers in the late nineteenth century. He was director of the Mexican National Railroad; and had holdings in Yucatán, where he was involved in commercial henequen exports, a natural twine used for binding wheat; was a director of the Intercontinental Rubber Company, founded by Bernard Baruch; and provided capital for mining enterprises.

=== Philanthropy ===
Peabody served from 1884 to 1930 as a trustee of Hampton University, one of Virginia's historically black universities, where he established in the university library the Peabody Collection of rare materials on African-American history, one of the largest collections in the United States.

In 1901, Peabody donated land for Peabody Park at the University of North Carolina at Greensboro.

He funded YMCA of Metropolitan Columbus, in Georgia, built in 1903, believed to be the only marble "Y" building in the United States.

=== Death ===
Peabody died in 1938 at his home in Warm Springs, Georgia.

== Activism ==
=== Progressivism ===
Peabody retired from business in 1906 to pursue a life of public service. Long interested in social causes, he supported such progressive ideas as the single tax as advocated by Henry George in his book Progress and Poverty, free trade, women's suffrage and government ownership of railroads. He was active in the anti-war movement and also interested in education, particularly in the South and particularly for African-Americans. He was a co-founder, director and treasurer of the General Education Board, the Southern Education Board, and the Anna T. Jeanes Foundation. He also served on the board of trustees for the American Church Institute for Negroes, Hampton University in Virginia, Tuskegee University in Alabama, the University of Georgia, and the Brooklyn Polytechnic Institute. He was secretary of the Southern Education Board.

=== Political activities ===
From early in his life Peabody was interested in Democratic Party politics. In the early 1880s, he helped his close friend Edward M. Shepard organize the Young Men's Democratic Club of Brooklyn, took a part in the 1892 presidential campaign on behalf of Grover Cleveland, supported the Gold Democrats against William Jennings Bryan in 1896, then switched to more moderate monetary reform as a member of the executive committee of the Indianapolis Monetary Convention in 1897. In 1904–1906, he served as treasurer of the Democratic National Committee. Although he declined to run for political office, and declined President Wilson's offer of a place on the Federal Trade Commission, Peabody was an unofficial counselor to many government officials. From 1914 to 1921 he served on the board of directors of the Federal Reserve Bank in New York. In June 1932, Franklin Delano Roosevelt, then Governor of New York, visited Peabody for advice and support in deciding to run for President of the United States.

== Awards and honors ==
=== Honorary degrees ===
While his formal education was limited and he had no college degree, Peabody received honorary degrees from Harvard and Washington and Lee Universities in 1903, and the University of Georgia in 1906. This latter institution was the recipient of much of Peabody's philanthropy, including funds to build a fireproof building to house the university's library. He also donated land to help reorganize the State College of Agriculture, and founded the university's School of Forestry.

== Legacy ==
=== George Foster Peabody Awards ===
The George Foster Peabody Awards was established by the National Association of Broadcasters. It has been presented annually since 1941 for excellence in radio and, since 1948, television broadcasting, followed by World Wide Web content in the late 1990s. The award is administered by the University of Georgia's Henry W. Grady College of Journalism and Mass Communication and was named for Peabody, a benefactor of the university.

== Personal life ==
A tall man, in later years he developed a mane of white hair, and wore a heavy mustache and pointed beard, becoming known for his dignified and courtly manner. He maintained a mansion in Brooklyn, where he entertained lavishly. He also purchased a summer home known as Abenia at Lake George, where he spent most of each year. He was frequently a guest at Yaddo, the Saratoga Springs estate of Spencer Trask and his wife, Katrina Trask, and from both estates he developed a wide circle of influence, including many persons from the literary world, church, business, and government, who came to enjoy his gracious hospitality.

A longtime bachelor, in 1921, eleven years after Trask's death in a railroad accident, Peabody married Trask's widow Katrina, and they lived at Yaddo until her death in 1922. Thereafter, Yaddo became a great retreat for artists. Peabody continued to live on the estate, and in 1926, he adopted a daughter, Mrs. Marjorie P. Waite, a young woman whom he had come to know in connection with his civic and humanitarian activities and who aided him in them.

=== Estate in Warm Springs ===
After years of visiting the estate of his partner Spencer Trask in Saratoga Springs, New York Peabody agreed to succeed him in 1910 as chairman of the state commission set up to purchase and conserve the spa there, and in 1923 he acquired the property at Warm Springs, Georgia near his boyhood home. In 1924 he invited his friend Franklin Delano Roosevelt (who had recently contracted a paralytic illness) to visit the 90 degree Fahrenheit springs there, which Roosevelt eventually purchased and turned into the Little White House and the Roosevelt Warm Springs Institute for Rehabilitation, expanding it from a limited rehab center into a full-service center.
