= Gladys Fornell =

American dramatist

Gladys Fornell (1904–1982) was the writer of several successful plays, including an adaptation of The Emperor's New Clothes and Puss in Boots, both performed off-Broadway. Fornell was a lifelong writer and editor, first formally trained at the University of Minnesota. She went on to work with the Colorado Writers' Conference in 1948 and the artists’ community, Yaddo. She worked for the Princeton University Press for several years and spent most of her life in New York City.

Fornell was originally a fiction writer, showing promise with her unpublished novel, Montel, but after years of rejection, tried her hand at writing plays. She wrote several musicals in the 1950s and 1960s with the composer Richard d’Honau. Additionally, she wrote a family history entitled Nils Fornell Wisconsin Pioneer. She spent the end of her life in Illinois, where she died in 1982.
