= Katrina Trask =

American author and philanthropist (1853–1922)

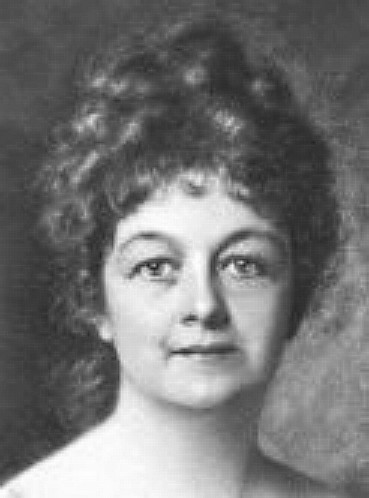
- Trask, c. 1900
- Born: Katrina Nichols; July 27, 1852; Brooklyn, New York, U.S.
- Died: January 8, 1922 (aged 69); Saratoga Springs, New York, U.S.
- Other name: Kate Nichols Trask
- Occupations: Author; philanthropist
- Years active: 1878–1922
- Spouses: Spencer Trask (m. 1874; died 1909) George Foster Peabody (m. 1921)
- Children: 4

Signature
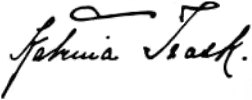

Katrina Trask (née Nichols; May 30, 1853 – January 8, 1922), also known as Kate Nichols Trask, was an American author and philanthropist.

== Early life ==
She was born Katrina Nichols in Brooklyn, New York to George Little Nichols and Christina Mary Cole. Her father was a partner in a large importing firm.

== Career ==
In 1878 she wrote Colorado Leaves, and in 1888 the Chronicles of Yaddo. Her first book, Under King Constantine, was published anonymously in 1892. The book contains three long love poems and was written in three days under intense mental strain. She hid the poems away for years until finally persuaded by her husband to have them published. It went through five editions and beginning with the second edition she started identifying herself as Katrina Trask.

She published Free Not Bound (1903), a novel, and Night & Morning (1907), a narrative in blank verse; both were about love and marriage. In 1908 she wrote King Alfred’s Jewel, a historical drama also in blank verse.

As an avid pacifist she wrote an antiwar play, In the Vanguard which appeared a year before World War I and went through eight editions and was performed by women clubs and church groups.

== Personal life and death ==
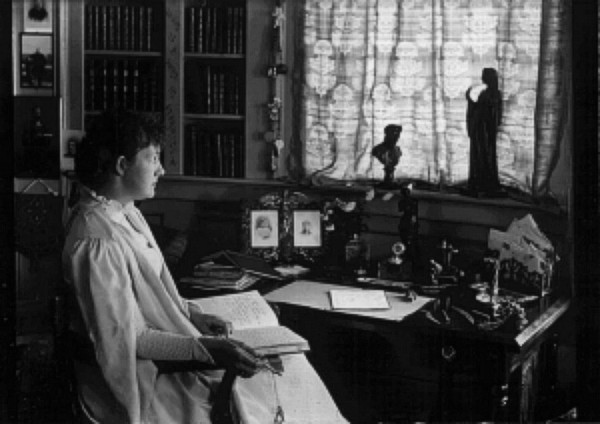
Trask in 1900

She married Spencer Trask, a Wall Street banker and financier, on November 12, 1874. Her husband was a director of several railroads and the president of the Edison Illuminating Company of New York. He also helped plan and finance the reorganization of The New York Times in 1896.

Katrina was the mother of four children, all of whom died in infancy or childhood. Spencer was killed in a railroad accident in 1909. In 1913 Katrina suffered several heart attacks and spent much of the remainder of her life developing and financing Yaddo, an artists' community in Saratoga Springs, New York, where she was an invalid.

On February 6, 1921, she married longtime family friend George Foster Peabody.

Katrina died less than a year later in 1922, and is buried at Yaddo.

== Works ==
- Colorado Leaves (1878)
- Chronicles of Yaddo (1888)
- Under King Constantine (1892)
- Sonnets and Lyrics (1894)
- White Satin and Homespun (1896)
- John Leighton, Jr.: a novel (1898)
- Lessons in Love (1900)
- Free Not Bound (1903)
- Mors Et Victoria [a Drama] (1903)
- Night & Morning (1907)
- King Alfred’s Jewel (1908)
- In the Vanguard (1913)
- The Statue of Peace (1914)
- The Mighty and the Lowly (1915)
- The Invisible Balance Sheet (1916)
- Without the Walls: A Reading Play (1919)
