= Marcus Fornell =

Swedish ice hockey player

- Born: July 19, 1994 (age 31) Sweden
- Height: 6 ft 2 in (188 cm)
- Weight: 194 lb (88 kg; 13 st 12 lb)
- Position: Centre
- Shoots: Left
- Elitserien team: Linköpings HC
- NHL draft: Undrafted
- Playing career: 2012–present

Marcus Fornell (born July 19, 1994) is a Swedish ice hockey player. He made his Elitserien debut playing with Linköpings HC during the 2012–13 Elitserien season.
