= Lake George (town), New York =

Lake George
- Town
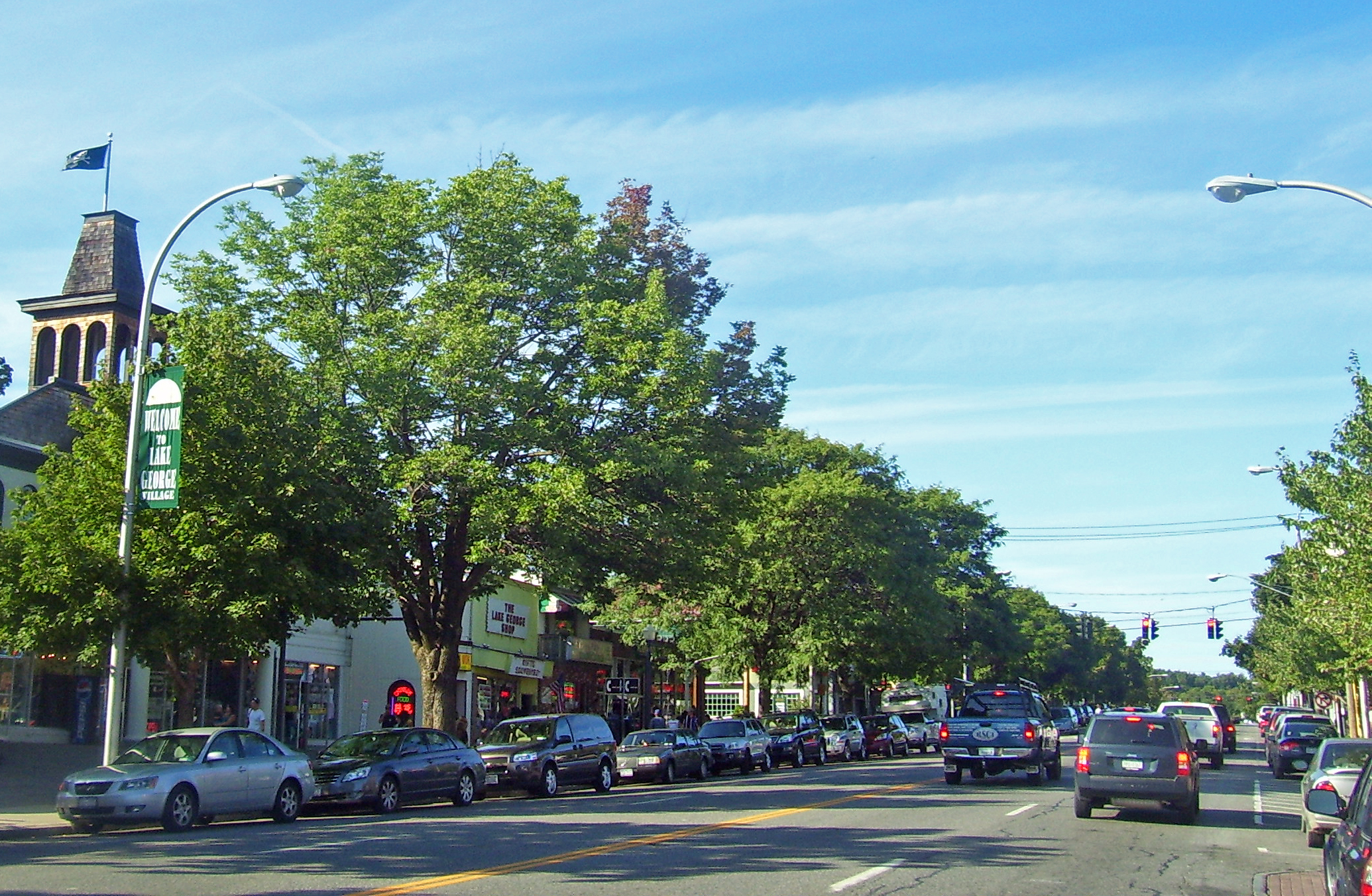
- Downtown Lake George

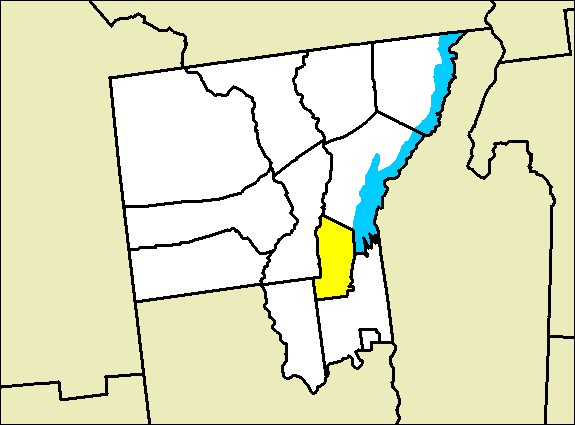
- Location of Lake George in Warren County

- Location within the state of New York
- Coordinates: 43°25′28″N 73°42′55″W
- Country: United States
- State: New York
- County: Warren

Area
  - Total: 32.62 sq mi (84.48 km^{2})
  - Land: 30.07 sq mi (77.88 km^{2})
  - Water: 2.55 sq mi (6.60 km^{2})

Population (2020)
  - Total: 3,502
  - Density: 116.5/sq mi (44.97/km^{2})
- Time zone: UTC-5 (Eastern (EST))
  - Summer (DST): UTC-4 (EDT)
- ZIP code: 12845
- Area code: 518
- Website: lakegeorgetown.org

Lake George is a town in Warren County, New York, United States. The population was 3,502 at the 2020 census. The town is named after the lake, Lake George. The town is part of the Glens Falls Metropolitan Statistical Area.

== History ==
The first European to visit the lake was Father Isaac Jogues in August 1642. He was later captured by Mohawks, escaped, and returned home to France. In 1646, he was sent on a political mission to the Iroquois to propose a treaty of peace, and at that point dubbed the lake "Lac du Saint Sacrement" (Lake of the Blessed Sacrament).

In 1755, the lake was renamed "Lake George" by General William Johnson, in honor of King George II.

Lake George was also the site of Fort William Henry, named in honor of Prince William Henry, grandson of King George II, by General Johnson. The fort, its surrender to the Marquis de Montcalm after a six-day siege by the French and Indians, and the following massacre all in 1757 were used by James Fenimore Cooper as the background for his famous novel The Last of the Mohicans. The fort was reconstructed and opened to the public as a museum in 1953.

The town was established in 1810 as the "Town of Caldwell" from parts of the nearby towns of Bolton, Queensbury, and Thurman, and in 1962, the town changed its name to Lake George.

The town is also home to Wiawaka, a historic retreat center that was founded in 1903 for female textile workers from Troy but operates as a nonprofit for everyone today.

The Forward shipwreck site, Royal C. Peabody Estate, Wiawaka Bateaux Site, and Wiawaka Holiday House are listed on the National Register of Historic Places. The Land Tortoise (radeau) Shipwreck Site and Owl's Nest are National Historic Landmarks. The Lake George Battlefield Park Historic District was listed in 2011.

== Geography ==
According to the United States Census Bureau, the town has a total area of 32.7 square miles (85 km^{2}), of which 30.2 square miles (78 km^{2}) is land and 2.5 square miles (6.5 km^{2}) (7.49%) is water. According to the Lake George Association, Lake George is 32 miles in length and a maximum of two miles in width.

The Adirondack Northway passes through the town.

== Demographics ==
Historical population
| Census | Pop. | Note | %± |
|---|---|---|---|
| 1820 | 723 | | — |
| 1830 | 797 | | 10.2% |
| 1840 | 693 | | −13.0% |
| 1850 | 752 | | 8.5% |
| 1860 | 1,074 | | 42.8% |
| 1870 | 1,041 | | −3.1% |
| 1880 | 1,223 | | 17.5% |
| 1890 | 1,377 | | 12.6% |
| 1900 | 1,465 | | 6.4% |
| 1910 | 1,482 | | 1.2% |
| 1920 | 1,297 | | −12.5% |
| 1930 | 1,730 | | 33.4% |
| 1940 | 1,467 | | −15.2% |
| 1950 | 1,621 | | 10.5% |
| 1960 | 2,429 | | 49.8% |
| 1970 | 2,806 | | 15.5% |
| 1980 | 3,394 | | 21.0% |
| 1990 | 3,211 | | −5.4% |
| 2000 | 3,578 | | 11.4% |
| 2010 | 3,515 | | −1.8% |
| 2020 | 3,502 | | −0.4% |
U.S. Decennial Census

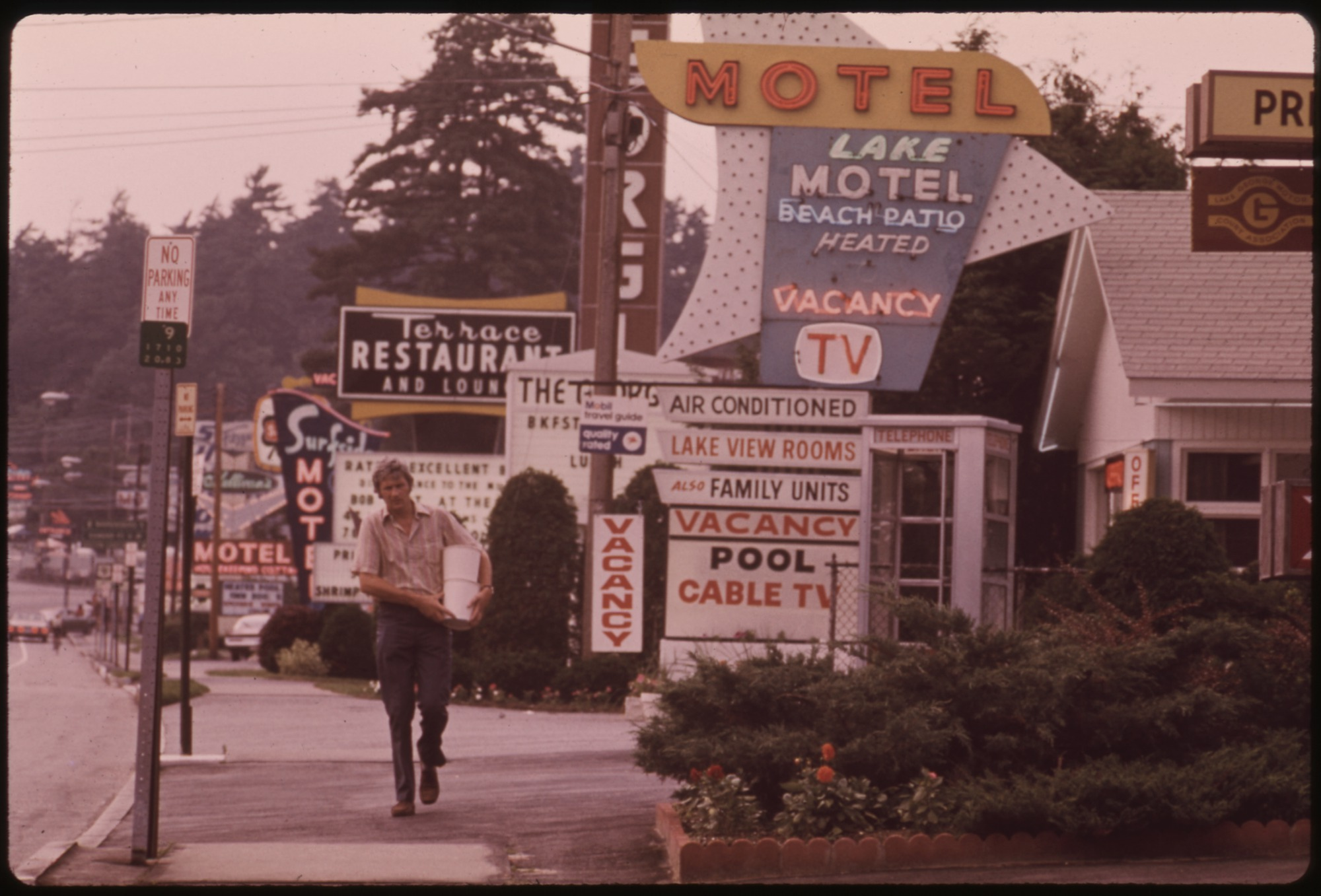
A row of motels in Lake George, 1973

As of the census of 2000, there were 3,578 people, 1,533 households, and 1,002 families residing in the town. The population density was 118.3 people per square mile (45.7 people/km^{2}). There were 2,456 housing units at an average density of 81.2 per square mile (31.4/km^{2}). The racial makeup of the town was 97.74% White, 0.53% Black or African American, 0.25% Native American, 0.59% Asian, 0.03% Pacific Islander, 0.17% from other races, and 0.70% from two or more races. Hispanic or Latino of any race were 0.92% of the population.

There were 1,533 households, out of which 27.2% had children under the age of 18 living with them, 50.8% were married couples living together, 9.8% had a female householder with no husband present, and 34.6% were non-families. 28.1% of all households were made up of individuals, and 9.8% had someone living alone who was 65 years of age or older. The average household size was 2.33 and the average family size was 2.84.

In the town, the population was spread out, with 21.7% under the age of 18, 6.8% from 18 to 24, 25.8% from 25 to 44, 30.8% from 45 to 64, and 14.9% who were 65 years of age or older. The median age was 42 years. For every 100 females, there were 103.5 males. For every 100 females age 18 and over, there were 100.1 males.

The median income for a household in the town was $42,125, and the median income for a family was $48,789. Males had a median income of $31,134 versus $22,375 for females. The per capita income for the town was $22,311. About 3.6% of families and 6.8% of the population were below the poverty line, including 7.2% of those under age 18 and 6.3% of those age 65 or over.

== Communities and locations in the Town of Lake George ==
- Big Hollow – A hamlet northwest of Lake George village.
- Bloody Pond – A pond in the southern part of town that received its name from the Battle of Lake George.
- Crosbyside – A hamlet east of Lake George village.
- Diamond Point – A hamlet north of Lake George village on the western shore of Lake George. This hamlet has ZIP code 12824.
- Fort William Henry – The reconstructed historic fort is in Lake George village, originally built by the British during the French and Indian War.
- Lake George – A village located at the southern end of Lake George.
- Prospect Mountain – A mountain near Big Hollow.
