= St. James Episcopal Church =

St. James Episcopal Church or variants thereof may refer to:

== United States ==
=== California ===
- St. James' Episcopal Church (Los Angeles)
- St. James Episcopal Church (Sonora, California)
- St. James' Episcopal Church (South Pasadena, California)

=== Colorado ===
- St. James Episcopal Church (Meeker, Colorado), listed on the National Register of Historic Places (NRHP) in Rio Blanco County

=== Connecticut ===
- St. James Episcopal Church (New London, Connecticut), listed on the NRHP in New London County

=== Delaware ===
- St. James' Church (Newport, Delaware)
- St. James Episcopal Church, Mill Creek

=== Florida ===
- St. James' Episcopal Church (Lake City, Florida)
- St. James Episcopal Church (Ormond Beach, Florida)

=== Georgia ===
- St. James' Episcopal Church (Cedartown, Georgia)

=== Idaho ===
- St. James Episcopal Church (Mountain Home, Idaho), listed on the NRHP in Elmore County
- St. James Episcopal Church (Payette, Idaho), listed on the NRHP in Payette County

=== Illinois ===
- St. James Episcopal Church (Lewistown, Illinois), listed on the NRHP in Fulton County
- St. James Episcopal Church (McLeansboro, Illinois), listed on the NRHP in Hamilton County

=== Indiana ===
- St. James Memorial Chapel (Howe, Indiana)

=== Iowa ===
- St. James Episcopal Church (Oskaloosa, Iowa), listed on the NRHP in Mahaska County

=== Kentucky ===
- Saint James' Episcopal Church (Pewee Valley, Kentucky)
- Saint James' Episcopal Church (Prestonsburg, Kentucky)
- St. James Episcopal Church (Shelbyville, Kentucky)

=== Louisiana ===
- St. James Episcopal Church (Baton Rouge, Louisiana), listed on the NRHP in East Baton Rouge Parish

=== Maine ===
- St. James Episcopal Church (Old Town, Maine), listed on the NRHP in Penobscot County

=== Maryland ===
- St James Episcopal Church (Baltimore, Maryland)

=== Massachusetts ===
- St. James Episcopal Church (Amesbury, Massachusetts)
- St. James Episcopal Church (Cambridge, Massachusetts), listed on the NRHP in Middlesex County

=== Michigan ===
- St. James Episcopal Church (Grosse Ile, Michigan), listed on the NRHP in Wayne County
- Saint James' Episcopal Church (Sault Ste. Marie, Michigan)

=== Minnesota ===
- St. James Episcopal Church (Minneapolis, Minnesota), better known as "Saint James On-The-Parkway" (or "St. James OTP")

=== Montana ===
- St. James Episcopal Church and Rectory (Bozeman, Montana), listed on the NRHP in Gallatin County
- St. James Episcopal Church and Parish House (Lewistown, Montana), listed on the NRHP in Fergus

=== New York ===
- St. James Episcopal Church (Batavia, New York)
- St. James Episcopal Church (Fort Edward, New York), listed on the NRHP in Washington County
- St. James Episcopal Church (Hyde Park, New York), Episcopal Diocese of New York
- St. James Episcopal Church (Lake George, New York)
- St. James' Episcopal Church (Manhattan)
- St. James' Episcopal Church and Parish House, The Bronx, New York, listed on the NRHP in Bronx County
- St. James Episcopal Church, part of the Skaneateles Historic District in Skaneateles, New York
- St. James Episcopal Church (Watkins Glen, New York), listed on the NRHP in Schuyler County

=== North Carolina ===
- St. James Episcopal Church and Rectory (Kittrell, North Carolina), listed on the NRHP in Vance County
- St. James Episcopal Church (Wilmington, North Carolina), the oldest church in the city of Wilmington

=== Ohio ===
- St. James Episcopal Church (Boardman, Ohio), listed on the NRHP in Mahoning County
- St. James Episcopal Church (Painesville, Ohio), listed on the NRHP in Lake County
- St. James Episcopal Church (Zanesville, Ohio), listed on the NRHP in Muskingum County

=== Oklahoma ===
- St. James Episcopal Church (Wagoner, Oklahoma), Oklahoma's oldest Episcopal church still in use.

=== Oregon ===
- St. James Episcopal Church (Coquille, Oregon), listed on the NRHP in Coos County

=== Pennsylvania ===
- St. James Episcopal Church (Muncy, Pennsylvania), listed on the NRHP in Lycoming County
- Church of St. James the Less, Philadelphia, Pennsylvania, National Historic Landmark

=== South Carolina ===
- St. James Episcopal Church (Santee, South Carolina), in Georgetown, SC, listed on the NRHP and as an NHL in Charleston County

=== Tennessee ===
- St. James Episcopal Church (Cumberland Furnace, Tennessee), listed on the NRHP in Dickson County
- St. James Episcopal Church (Greeneville, Tennessee)

=== Texas ===
- St. James Episcopal Church (La Grange, Texas), listed on the NRHP in Fayette County

=== Utah ===
- St. James Episcopal Church (Midvale, Utah)

=== Vermont ===
- St. James' Episcopal Church (Arlington, Vermont), one of the oldest churches in the United States

=== Virginia ===
- St. James Episcopal Church (Portsmouth, Virginia) in the Downtown Portsmouth Historic District
- St. James Episcopal Church (Richmond, Virginia)
- St. James' Episcopal Church (Warrenton, Virginia), in the Warrenton Historic District (Warrenton, Virginia)
- St. James Episcopal Church (Leesburg, Virginia), in the Leesburg Historic District (Leesburg, Virginia)

=== Washington, D.C. ===
- St. John's Episcopal Church, Lafayette Square

=== Wisconsin ===
- St. James' Episcopal Church (Manitowoc, Wisconsin)
- St. James Episcopal Church (Milwaukee, Wisconsin), listed on the NRHP in Milwaukee County

== See also ==
- St. James Church (disambiguation)
- St. James Catholic Church (disambiguation)
