= Ticonderoga (1884) =

Lake George steamboat

Ticonderoga was a 172-feet long, 28 feet wide wooden steamboat owned by the Lake George Steamboat Company and the that sailed on Lake George for five decades.

== Description ==
She was built in 1884 and with capacity for 800 passengers. Her maximum speed was 20mph.

She was the replacement vessel of Lake George Steamboat Company's vessel Ganouskie, which had started to deteriorate in 1884. In 1896, she was renovated to accommodate 1,000 passengers.

Her route was between the hamlet of Ticonderoga at the north end of the Lake George, in Warren County, New York state, and the village of Lake George at the south end of the lake.

She was captained by Elias S. Harris and Captain Frank G. White.

== Sinking ==
1904 postcard showing Roger's Slide and Roger's Rock landing

Ticonderoga caught fire on Lake George on 29 August 1901.

On a trip to Baldwin (now known as Ticonderoga, New York), departing at 7:27am she caught fire near Roger's Rock. Passengers and crew escaped, and her wreck drifted the shore near the Roger's Rock Hotel.

The boat was insured for $85,000. Captain White was in charge during the fire. No lives were lost.

== Aftermath ==
c. 1900 postcard of Hearts Bay, Lake George

The ship was left to burn in Lake George's Hearts Bay.

The Post-Star newspaper compared her sinking with other steamboat fires on Lake George, including the John Jay steamboat fire in 1856, the 1892 fire on the Island Queen, and the James Caldwell steamboat fire around 1820.

She was replaced by the Mohican (predecessor of the Mohican II) in 1908.

== See also ==
- Ticonderoga II
