= Minne-Ha-Ha II =

Stern-wheel steamboat

Coordinates: 43°25′15″N 73°42′35.5″W

The Minne-Ha-Ha is a stern-wheel steamboat on Lake George, New York, which is owned and operated by the Lake George Steamboat Company.

== History ==
The steamer Minne-Ha-Ha operating on Lake George

During the 1950s and 1960s, the Lake George Steamboat Company owned and operated two ships on Lake George: the Ticonderoga II, a retired navy ship from World War II, and the Mohican II, a converted steamer (to diesel) that was built by the company between 1907 and 1908. The Ticonderoga made trips up and down the lake, while the Mohican would make two trips into Paradise Bay.

In 1968, the number of tourists to Lake George Village, the primary port of the Lake George Steamboats, increased, and requests for shorter cruises became more frequent. A third boat was needed to meet the needs of people who did not have time for the longer cruises provided by the other two ships. Wilbur Dow, the company's owner at the time, wanted to make the boat itself an attraction and it was quickly decided that it should be powered by steam. A side-wheeler was originally considered to keep with the tradition of the older steamboats on the lake, but the ship, at an estimated 100-foot design, would have appeared to be too wide and short. It was then decided to construct a sternwheeler steamboat which would debut in the summer of 1969.

=== Construction and design ===
The ship was designed by H.M. Tiedemann Company of New York City. Construction started on October 2, 1968, at the Steamboat Company's shipyard in Baldwin, located near Ticonderoga, New York, at the lake's northern end. The hull of the new ship was launched on December 6, 1968, and was towed by the Mohican to the Steel Pier in Lake George Village. The remainder of the boat's superstructure was erected there, and completed over the winter months at the cost of $270,000. The new boat was 103 feet long, had a 30-foot beam, and a draft of 3.5 feet. She had a displacement of 200 tons and a top speed of 7 miles per hour. Wilbur Dow's wife, Ruth, struck the champagne bottle against the boat on July 30, 1969, and the ship was christened Minne-Ha-Ha, meaning "laughing waters". She is the second boat by the Lake George Steamboat Company to have this name, sharing it with a side-wheeler that served from 1857 to 1878.

=== 1998 renovation ===
The ship's demand was becoming higher so Bill Dow, Wilbur's son, decided to modify the Minne. Since she did not fit the requirements of the Americans with Disabilities Act, meaning she was not handicapped accessible, along with her difficult navigation because of her low speed, the decision was made to lengthen the vessel. On September 14, 1998, she sailed up to the dry-dock at Baldwin and her hull was replaced with a new, well-designed one. Her midsection was cut into two pieces, and 34 feet of the hull was installed between them. On December 9 of that year, she was launched back into the lake and towed back to the Steel Pier by the Mohican, where her superstructure was completed.

Her renovation was completed in late May 1999. She was also given a handicap-accessible elevator to provide access to her second deck. A small propeller powered by a Caterpillar diesel engine was added in front of her paddlewheel as a backup safety measure to assist the ship in the event that it was to lose steam power, as had happened in the past. A propeller was added to assist the much larger Minne in docking and preventing the ship from becoming beached on large rocks next to her dock due to the lake's strong winds. The Minne-Ha-Ha is only powered by her steam paddle wheel during her trip. Her signature twin split stacks were removed and replaced by a 30-foot-tall sleek, single stack, and her three steam whistles were mounted to the new stack. The old stacks are still viewable from their mounting location on the Steel Pier. She retains her steam calliope and plays it after every cruise. A 12 x 20 ft. skylight was added to her top deck. After renovation, the Minne upgraded to a length of 137 feet and a draft of 3 feet 9 inches. She has a top speed of approximately 8 mph.

=== 21st century ===
In 2001, her paddlewheel was rebuilt.

After the 2007 season, her skylight was removed and replaced with an elevated seating area, which provides more seats with an escalated view.

In 2008 the words "Happy Birthday" were played on her calliope to honor the 100th birthday of the Mohican.

In 2013, the Lake George Steamboat Company revived an old tradition of steamers playing their calliopes as they enter Lake George Village returning to port, in addition to playing it after each cruise.

== Cruises ==
Since August 1, 1969, the Minne makes six-hourly trips each day; daily during the summer months, and on weekends during the spring and fall. Along with this they added moonlight entertainment cruise on Saturday nights.

== Steam whistles ==
The Minne has three operating steam whistles mounted on her stack: an 8" Crosby 3-Chime, an 8" x 50" single note "Mockingbird", and a 1912 3-Bell Lunkenheimer steam whistle which was originally on the Iroquois, an Army Corps of Engineers boat on the Ohio River. The "Mockingbird" debuted in 1970 and replaced the boat's original three-chime whistle. The Crosby was added during the 1970s, and the Lunkenheimer was added during the 1998 renovation.

== Calliope ==
The original calliope was built in 1974 by the Frisbie Engine & Machine Co. The Frisbie calliope was replaced by a smaller model in 1993, before being replaced with a new one built and installed by Dave Morecraft in 2013.
