= Ethan Allen boating accident =

2005 boating incident

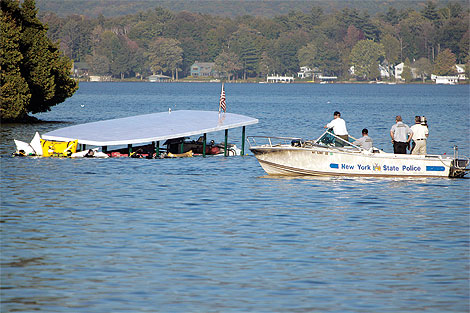
- The Ethan Allen is raised to the surface of Lake George the day after it capsized
- Date: October 2, 2005
- Time: 2:55 p.m. (EDT)
- Location: Lake George (lake), Lake George (town), New York; 43.456953°N 73.689938°W
- Cause: Capsizing caused by overcrowding
- Deaths: 20
- Injuries: 9
- Inquiries: Capsizing of New York State-Certificated Vessel Ethan Allen, Lake George, New York (NTSB)
- Convicted: Richard Paris; Shoreline Cruises
- Sentence: $250 fine 200+ hours community service

The Ethan Allen was a 40-foot (12 m), glass-enclosed tour boat operated by Shoreline Cruises on Lake George in upstate New York. On October 2, 2005, at 2:55 p.m. local time, with 47 passengers—mostly seniors—aboard, the Ethan Allen capsized and sank just south of Cramer Point in the Town of Lake George. Twenty passengers died, causing government regulators to consider new laws on passenger boat capacity.

== Boat ==
History
- Name: Ethan Allen (1979–2005); Double Dolphin (1964–1979)
- Owner: Shoreline Cruises, Inc. (1979–2005); Whaling City Dredge & Dock Corp. (1964–1979)
- Builder: The Anchorage, Inc; Warren, Rhode Island
- Acquired: May 1979
- Out of service: October 2, 2005
- Identification: NY state reg.: NY1267FP
- Fate: Sunk
- Status: Recovered for testing

General characteristics
- Length: 38 feet (12 m)
- Beam: 12 feet (3.7 m)
- Decks: 1
- Installed power: 210 hp (160 kW) diesel engine
- Propulsion: Single-shaft, three-blade propeller
- Capacity: 50 (Note: The United States Coast Guard and New York State Office of Parks officially allowed 48 passengers and two crewmembers but "postaccident stability calculations [by the NTSB] demonstrated that it should have been permitted to carry only 14 persons.")
- Crew: 2

The Ethan Allen was constructed in 1964 at a Rhode Island shipyard for use as a small passenger vessel by a company in Groton, Connecticut. It was initially named the Double Dolphin. Pursuant to a 1976 certificate of inspection from the United States Coast Guard, the ship was stable to carry 48 passengers and two crew members. At some point between 1966 and 1979, a metal canvas canopy was installed on Double Dolphin.

In 1979, Shoreline Cruises of Lake George purchased a fleet of small vessels for operation on the lake, including the Double Dolphin. Because Shoreline operated the ship, which they renamed the Ethan Allen, solely on state waters, it was no longer subject to inspection by the Coast Guard; oversight fell to the New York State Office of Parks. In 1989, Ethan Allen's metal canopy was replaced with a heavier wooden canopy and plexiglas windows were installed.

The owner of Shoreline Cruises told the National Transportation Safety Board (NTSB) that, at the height of the tourist season in 2005, Ethan Allen and its two similarly sized sister vessels transported approximately 300 passengers per day combined.

== Sinking ==
The boat was carrying a tourist group, the Trenton Travelers, based out of Trenton, Michigan. The group included senior citizens from Michigan and Ohio. They were on an hour-long fall foliage tour on the lake. When the boat capsized it sent about 47 passengers and crew, including the captain, into the water. At the time of the sinking, the ship's windows were swung open. They remained in that position even with the boat sinking and were still up when the boat was recovered. The boat sank in water that was 59 feet (18 m) deep, and witnesses told officials that passengers had not been wearing life preservers. There were multiple attempts to save individuals on the boat with people passing on boats, or who had swum from shore tossing them life preservers or pulling them out of the water.

Injured passengers and crew were sent to Glens Falls Hospital by ambulances from Lake George and the nearby towns of Hague, Warrensburg, and Moreau. North Warren Emergency Medical Service (EMS), which incorporates the towns of Horicon and Chester, assisted in the effort. The Water Rescue Teams, part of the volunteer fire departments of Horicon, North Queensbury and Lake George, were also called to the scene. Officials of Warren County set up a makeshift morgue on the lawn by the lake, while locals helped survivors.

== Victims ==
Three passengers were treated for major injuries at local hospitals and six passengers were treated for minor injuries. The 20 deceased victims are believed to have died from drowning, not hypothermia, as the water in the lake was 68 °F (20 °C).

== Investigation ==
Speculation about the cause of the capsizing originally centered on the sizable wake of a much larger cruise ship, the Lake George Steamboat Company's Mohican, which traverses Lake George daily. However, no evidence emerged to support this theory. Tourists at a nearby camp reported that the Mohican did not pass the area of the lake where the Ethan Allen sank until 20 minutes later.

There were multiple reports by people near and around the lake of several other boats being in the vicinity. Reports from some people at local campsites claim that a speed boat had passed by, while others claim the lake was calm. Warren County Police did not confirm whether there were other boats around the Ethan Allen. The weather was also not a factor in this sinking, as the skies were clear and the wind was calm.

On October 3, the Ethan Allen was raised by investigators and taken to the Warren County Airport. The following week, the Ethan Allen sister boat de Champlain was utilized on Lake George for a series of tests to determine what caused it to capsize. According to WRGB, the Mohican was also used during tests on three consecutive days. On October 15 it was confirmed that the Ethan Allen capsizing was due to the sharp turn into the wake of the passing boat, the shift of the passengers to the port side, and the overloading of the vessel. The National Transportation Safety Board determined the high degree turn to starboard to meet the wave head on was a normal reaction to the circumstances, however it was not timely enough to prevent the vessel from immediately listing to port right after contact. On November 4, the alcohol results from the toxicology center showed that the captain of the Ethan Allen did not drink alcohol on the day of the sinking.

On February 3, 2006, the official police report for the Ethan Allen sinking was released after a three-month delay. The report is 530 pages in three volumes, with all the information about the Ethan Allen. There has been much discussion over whether or not the Mohican did or did not pass the Ethan Allen, causing it to capsize. People around and on the lake at the time claim the Mohican had passed 20 minutes after the Ethan Allen had capsized. The pilot of the Ethan Allen, Richard Paris, stated:

I started to swing the bow of the boat to the right and immediately encountered stray waves from the wake of the Mohican that was going northbound. The entire boat then tipped to the left and just kept right on going.

Regardless of the actions or locations of other craft, the report concluded that the Ethan Allen incident was not a crime.

=== NTSB report ===
On July 25, 2006, the final report for the Ethan Allen boating sinking was released by The National Transportation Safety Board. It established that Ethan Allen had capsized as a result of insufficient stability. The US Coast Guard was responsible for the original certification of the vessel, then called the Double Dolphin. She was originally certificated by the USCG for 48 passengers and two crew.

When the owner of the Double Dolphin fitted the boat with an elaborate pipe structure and canvas top, the center of gravity was raised and, more importantly, the projected side area vastly increased. No retesting to either Simplified Stability Proof Test (SST) nor to Subchapter S is recorded to have occurred under Coast Guard oversight after those modifications were carried out.

In the mid-1970s the boat along with two other sister vessels was sold to Shoreline Cruises in Lake George. The US Coast Guard certificates were at that point still current and valid. New York State vessel regulators were given those certificates and, based on the US Coast Guard officially stating (incorrectly) that the boat had sufficient reserve stability to safely carry 48 passengers and 2 crew, New York regulators then gave the boat the same rating. In 1989, when the owner had a hard (wood and fiberglass) top installed to replace the pipe structure canopy, it was determined that its lower height more than compensated for its slightly greater weight. The state of New York did not have any method in place for assessing vessel stability and the vessel received no further testing or oversight regarding stability.

The NTSB carried out stability tests of a sister ship, to both the SST and subchapter S, and discovered that there was not anywhere near a 47-person capacity. In fact, 14 persons at the official 140 pounds (64 kg) weight per person were as much as the Ethan Allen could have been certificated.

According to the NTSB, the capsizing occurred due to a series of events. The total weight of the 47 passengers aboard was far in excess of the safe passenger weight under prevailing U.S. laws. The pilot made a hard turn to the right at speed. The seating arrangement put three people on the port side versus two on the starboard side—giving a permanent two-degree list (tilt) to port—and the bench seats had no way of stopping involuntary sliding, so the centrifugal force of the hard turn caused involuntary movement of the passengers to port. That movement increased the list to port and the increased list caused more sliding. Within seconds, the center of gravity was no longer over the hull and the boat capsized.

== Legal ==
On February 5, 2007, a grand jury indicted Richard Paris, the boat's captain, and Shoreline Cruises on misdemeanor charges of criminal negligence. Paris faced a maximum $250 fine and/or 15 days in jail if found guilty. The grand jury, which met for two months, also issued a report proposing new laws to prevent a repeat of the disaster. This was the third report about the capsizing. In March 2007, Paris pleaded guilty and received a fine of $250 and 200 hours of community service.

By Friday, October 7, two of the survivors who returned to Michigan filed lawsuits for damages of $70,000 each.

A lawsuit was brought by the victims and their families in the United States District Court for the Northern District of New York against Shoreline Cruises; its affiliate Quirks Marine Rentals; boat captain Richard Paris; Scarano Boat Building Inc., which modified the Ethan Allen; Shoreline Travel & Tours Inc., a Canadian firm that organized the leaf-peeping tour; and the Lake George Steamboat Company, operator of the Mohican. On June 25, 2008, it was announced that Shoreline Cruises, Quirks, and Paris settled with the plaintiffs for undisclosed terms. In September 2008, a trial date for April 13, 2010, for the remaining defendants was announced. The portion of the suit against Scarano was dismissed because of a lack of evidence.

It came to light that Shoreline Cruises had been sold a fraudulent liability insurance policy. Shoreline paid premiums for a $2 million policy for about two years before the Ethan Allen capsized. Two weeks after the incident, they were told the policy did not exist.

The last lawsuit, in which the state of New York was named as a defendant because state boat inspectors were alleged to have been negligent, was dismissed by the state's highest court in November 2012. The Court of Appeals found the state had "governmental immunity."

== Memorial ==
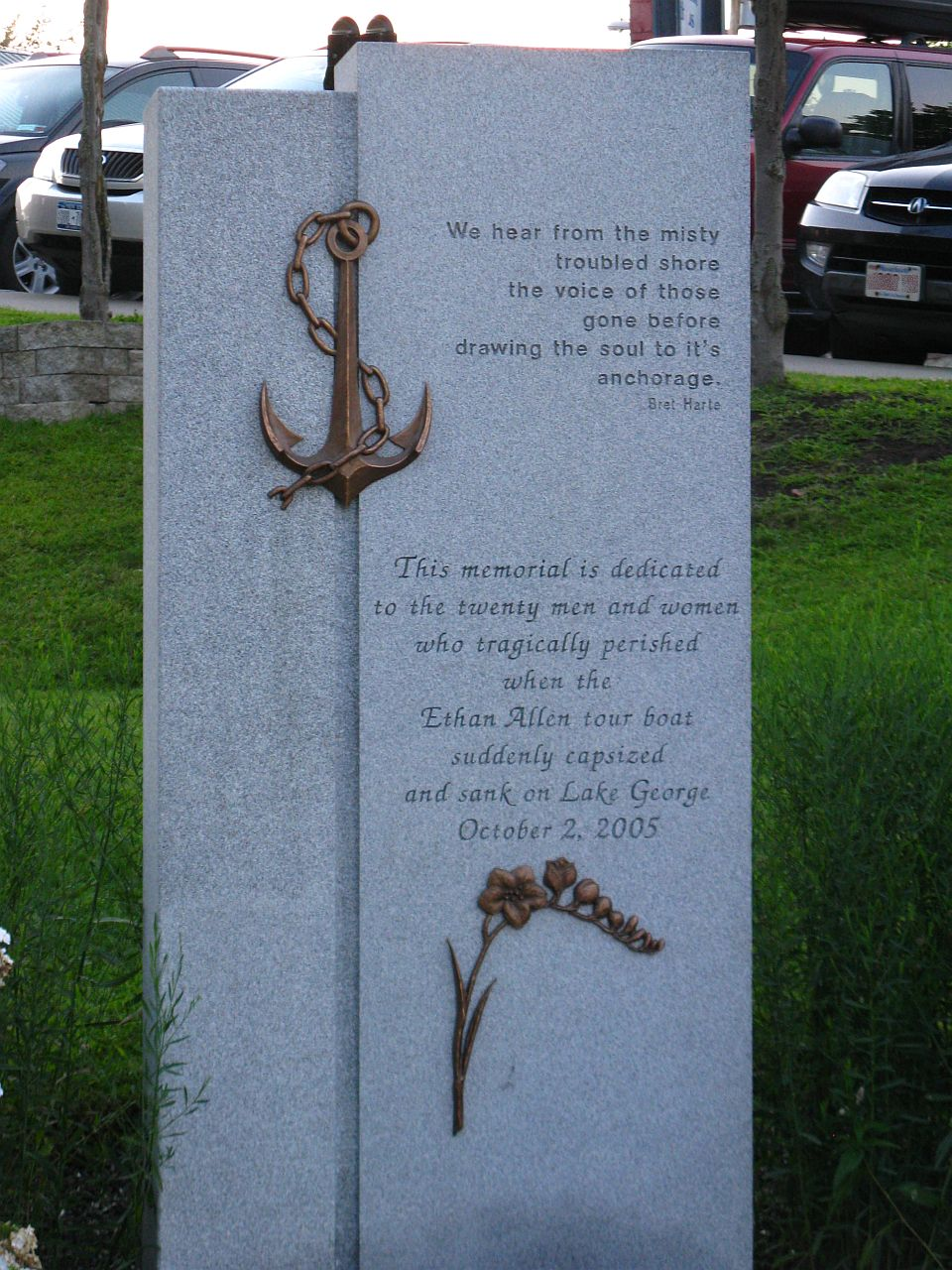
Memorial monument

On February 1, 2006, a service to community ceremony was held at the Glens Falls Civic Center to recognize the people, including paid professionals, volunteers, and citizens, who helped during the sinking. The names of the 20 people who died that day were read. An estimated 600 people attended the ceremony. Lake George Village Mayor Robert M. Blais said that plans were in the works for a memorial to recognize the victims and the survivors sometime around the one-year anniversary of the sinking, October 2, 2006. The monument is in place on the shore near Lower Amherst Street.

== In popular culture ==
The Ethan Allen is clearly identified in the 2019 Steven Soderbergh film, The Laundromat, as the boat which kills Joe Martin (James Cromwell) which then becomes the catalyst for the uncovering of the Panama Papers by his widow, Ellen Martin (Meryl Streep).

== See also ==
- John Jay (steamship) fatal accident on Lake George
