= John Jay (steamboat) =

New York steamship

History
- Name: John Jay
- Owner: John J. Harris, Lake George Steamboat Company
- Operator: Captain Elias S. Harris
- Route: Ticonderoga to Caldwall, on Lake George
- Builder: John J. Harris
- Completed: 1850
- Acquired: 1854
- Out of service: 1856
- Fate: Destroyed by fire and sunk

General characteristics
- Type: Steamboat
- Tonnage: 250 tons
- Length: 140-foot (43 m)
- Installed power: 75 horsepower (56 kW)
- Propulsion: wood-fired steam engine
- Speed: 13 mph (21 km/h) (max)
- Notes: Successor of vessel of William Caldwell (steamboat), succeeded by Minne-ha-ha I (steamboat)

John Jay was a steamboat that operated on Lake George, New York state.

It was built by John Jay Harris in 1850, and bought by the Lake George Steamboat Company in 1854. The boat was captained by John Jay Harris's brother, Elias S. Harris.

The John Jay was destroyed by fire in 1856. Newspaper accounts provide inconsistent death-tolls from drowning with casualties numbers up to 15. The captain attributed the disaster to weather, while other accounts attribute it to a fire in the smoke stack, caused by the captain's haste.

Its wreck remains in Lake George.

== Description ==
View of Hunter's Point from the John Jay

The John Jay was a 140-foot (43 m) long steamboat built by John J. Harris in 1850, in Ticonderoga. 19th century accounts attribute the name of the boat to its builder, John Jay Harris, contradicting the historical marker plaque in Hague, which links the boat to American Founding Father, Justice John Jay.

Construction took three years and cost John J. Harris between $25,000 and $28,000. Dunham & Co were the engineers and the hull was constructed by Ferris Collyer.

The boat was 20 feet (6.1 m) wide and had a tonnage of 250 tons. It was powered by a wood-fired steam engine with 75 horsepower (56 kW). Its maximum speed was 13 mph (21 km/h). The boat was made of oak, and had two decks, the lower one was 15 feet about the guards.

== History ==
The boat landing at Ticonderoga

The boat was purchased by the Lake George Steamboat Company in 1854 to replace their steamboat the William Caldwell. The company had newly reorganised after retiring the William Caldwell in 1848.

The Times-Picayune reported in 1856, that the boat "was probably worth $8,000 or $10,000."

The boat was sometimes captained by John J. Harris and mostly captained by Elias S. Harris, on Lake George. Leander ‘Lee’ Harris worked as a deckhand on the boat.

The boat moved tourists between Caldwell (now known as Lake George Village) and Cook's Landing in Ticonderoga.

== 1856 sinking ==
John Jay fire and sinking
- Date: July 29, 1856
- Time: After 6pm (EDT)
- Location: Calamity Rock, Lake George, near Hauge; 43.750074°N 73.487816°W
- Type: Ship sinking
- Cause: Fire, sinking, drowning
- Deaths: 6 to 15

The John Jay burned and sunk on 29 July 1856 near a rock ledge (subsequently known as Calamity Rock), near the town Hague, close to the west bank of Lake George.

The steamboat was on its way from Ticonderoga to Caldwall and the fire occurred three-quarters of a mile from the Garfield Hotel (later known as Arthur's Hotel, Phoenix Hotel, Lake View House, and finally the Beachside Hotel.)

The boat was carrying over 80 passengers at the time of the incident. Reports on deaths varied in 1856 and into the 21st-century. The Republican Banner reported 15 deaths. Newspaper reporting, and the nearby historical marker report 6 deaths. One passenger reported that the life jackets on board were deteriorated with age and could not be inflated. The boat continued burning late into the evening.

The New York Almanack reports the sinking occurred on after a delayed departure time of 7pm. The nearby Historical Marker states that the boat departed at 6:15pm.

Steam boat service map of Lake George and Lake Champain

The Times-Picayune newspaper reported that the fire started in the smoke stack "which was overheated in an effort to make unusual speed, being behind time." The New-Orleans Commercial Bulletin blamed the use of "pitch pine wood, which choked up the smokey pipes". The newspaper reported that "passengers blame the Captain for not running her on shore immediately as was near a sandy beach at the time, instead of allowing her to go on for the purpose of trying to put out the fire and saving the boat."

The Times-Picayune reported that drowned passengers "would have been saved if they remained on the boat". The newspaper report stated that "it is charged that the officers of the boat behaved badly, and that the small boat of the steamer was not launched, as it should have been."

Surviving passengers were saved by small boats launched from the Garfield Hotel.

Boat landing on Lake George, near Hague

Elias S. Harris, who was both the pilot and the captain of the boat, was published in the Lake George Mirror newspaper. In his account, Harris explained that James Buchanan Henry invited him to report on the sinking. Harris wrote that that Lake George and Lake Champlain "were connected by stages, which were frequently obliged to make two trips a day in order to transfer passengers from Fort Ticonderoga to the Lake George steamer, which then ran down the lake to Cook’s Landing." He reports transporting over 80 passengers "on a very warm day" when the boat reached Friend's Point just as a "severe thunderstorm came up." He wrote that "wind struck the steamer...coming over the mountain with terrible force. The gale struck the top of the smokestack and stopped the draught" forcing the wood furnace doors open, scattering hot embers onto wood around the furnace door, setting it ablaze." Harris, wrote that the boat "had just passed the only chance of beaching the steamer in a safe place." He described "making the turn around Waltonian Island" when "the [burnt] wheel ropes gave way." Harris wrote that ran to promenade deck and was "surrounded by smoke and unable to see to see ahead" and that "he steered the burning craft for the shore as near as he could judge by looking at Waltonian Island." Harris reported that when "he got the vessel as far around as he thought it should go, he left the tiller, climbed the hurricane deck, and then saw that he had got around a little too far to pass the rocky point and go upon the sandy beach where he wished to run the vessel ashore." He reported that it "was too late to change the course of the vessel as she was about to strike the rocks near where her remains are to be seen at the present day." Harris wrote of he tried to move to get ahead of "where the crew and passengers where" and a "change in the wind showed him a narrow strip of the promenade deck along the wheelhouse, on the port side." He reported running through flames "with eyebrows and hair singed but not otherwise injured." His account states that he "jumped to the main deck" and "scenes passed through in a very short time are too heart rending to be even published at this late date." Harris wrote that to "keep the people from going overboard were his first orders to the crew and well they did their duty" and that it "was impossible to keep all on board." He attributes the deaths from drowning as "the cause of most of the drowning." And that the paddle wheels were "tending to draw those who jumped from the bow out into deep water" or under the moving paddle wheels.

Harris' account described event without stating that he was both the captain and the pilot of the boat. The newspaper editor placed a note above his account to inform readers of those details.

=== Victims ===
Reports on deaths varied in 1856 and into the 21st-century. The Republican Banner reported 15 deaths including: the lawyer J. C. Beach of New York, Joseph Reed of East Boston, Joseph Richards of Bangor, Mrs Belknao of New York City, Mr Metcalf of Cherry Hill, Miss Renshaw of New Orleans, Mrs Twing of Boston, Miss C.A. Fleet of Brooklyn, and Miss Sherman of Albany.

On 7 August 1985, the Times-Picayune reported that "the loss of life was greater than first reported" and that "a gentleman who left Caldwell this morning says that it was ascertained that at least fifteen person are dead or missing."

The historical marker database states that: "Six people drowned and rumors still [obscured] of others who were never found."

Staff at the Garfield Hotel, a nearby store, and nearby neighbours provided immediate first aid and clothing to the surviving passengers.

=== Immediate aftermath ===
On 9 August 1856, the Scientific American wrote about the John Jay sinking and the recent fatal Empire State steamboat explosion on Long Island Sound "by which casualties, no less than twenty persons have lost their lives, and a number of others have received dangerous injuries. The magazine wrote of the recent disasters "From reading the accounts of these accidents, we are convinced they could have been prevented by care and forethought".

The Minne-Ha-Ha

On 13 August 1856, a letter from Lake George was published in the New York Times describes "strong feelings in this community, where it is regards as one of the most flaring and many instances among steamboat and railroad accidents of a careless sacrifice of life and property to a paltry spirit of rivalry and cupidity."

Tourism in Lake George was reported to fall by 75% by late August 1856.

The Lake George Steamboat Company continued operations after spending $20,000 on a new steamboat, the Minne-Ha-Ha I, which started operating in the Spring of 1857.

== Legacy ==
The shipwreck remains on the on the west bank of Lake George.

A memorial plaque in Hague commemorates the sinking.

=== Popular culture ===
The disaster featured in an 1885 poetry book by Asa W. Brayton:

"The John Jay run, three years were done,

As faithful as a bride,

Some days two trips—she made no skips

When Captain Farr did guide...

And then 'John Jay' got in the way,

And she was better still,

But soon was burnt near to 'Cook’s Point,'

And some few persons killed."

=== Captain Elias S. Harris ===
Captain Elias retired from captaining steamboats (including the Minne-ha-ha I, the Horicon I, the Sagamore and the Ticonderola) for tourists in 1903 and died in 1906. He was posthumously inducted into the Glens Falls Heritage Hall of Fame in 1987.

== Fatal shipping disasters on Lake George ==
Nine people died when the pleasure yacht Rachel sank on Lake George on December 1893.

The 2005 Ethan Allen boating accident caused 20 fatalities on Lake George.

== U.S. Supreme Court Case ==
In 1854, the Supreme Court of the United States ruled that it could not make a judgement the case of Bogart v. The Steamboat John Jay. The court found that it could not make a judgement on the "mortgagee of a vessel and the owner" as the mortgage of a shop was did not have the "characteristics or attendants of a maritime loan."

Libellants were Seba M. Bogart, William J. Wilcox, and Leonard F. Fitch. Claimants included George Logan.
