= Ticonderoga =

Ticonderoga may refer to:

== Places in the United States ==
- Ticonderoga, New York, a town
  - Ticonderoga (CDP), New York, a hamlet and census-designated place within the town
- Fort Ticonderoga, a fortification in New York

== Ships ==
- USS Ticonderoga, five naval vessels of the US Navy
- Ticonderoga class, a variant of the US Navy Essex-class aircraft carrier
- Ticonderoga-class cruiser
- Ticonderoga (clipper)
- Ticonderoga (steamboat), a museum ship belonging to the Shelburne Museum, formerly operated on Lake Champlain
- Ticonderoga I (1884), steamboat of Lake George Steamboat Company, burned in 1901
- Ticonderoga II, formerly of the Lake George Steamboat Company
- Ticonderoga, a 72-foot ketch, built in 1936

== Other uses ==
- Battle of Ticonderoga (disambiguation)
- Ticonderoga Publications, an Australian independent publishing house
- Ticonderoga High School, Ticonderoga, New York
- Ticonderoga station, an Amtrak train station in Ticonderoga, New York
- Ticonderoga, a 2006 album by Morning 40 Federation
- Dixon Ticonderoga, an American office and art supplies manufacturer
