= Lac Du Saint Sacrement =

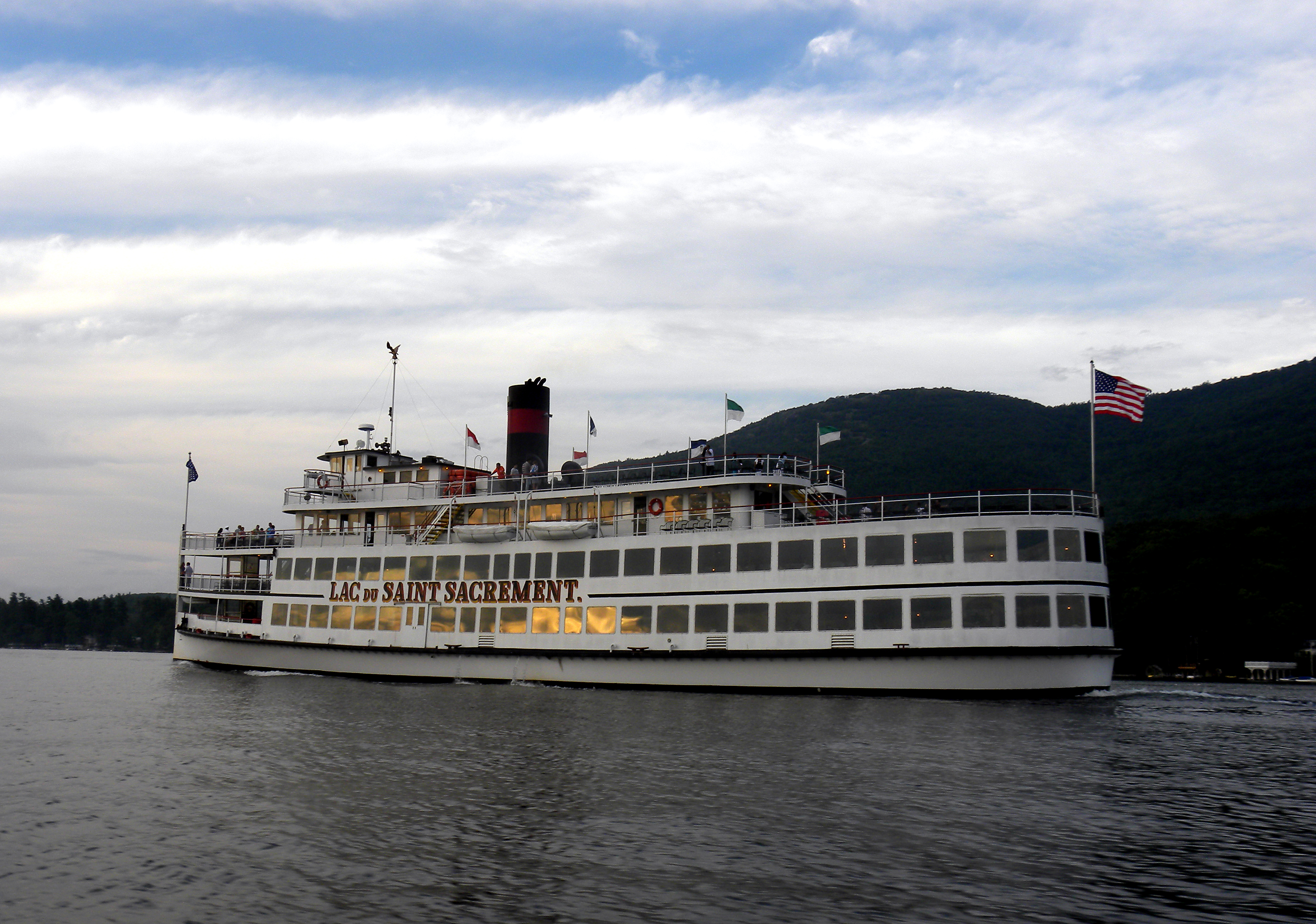
Lac du Saint Sacrement

Lac Du Saint Sacrement is considered to be the flagship of the Lake George Steamboat Company in Warren County, New York. It is the largest and newest boat in the company. The boat runs on Caterpillar Diesel engines and carries lifejackets for every passenger on board in case of an emergency. It also has rescue boats, an emergency generator, and incombustible furniture throughout the boat. The ship consists of 4 decks, 3 of which are heated and air-conditioned, cocktail lounges, a dance floor, a snack shop, and wheel chair lifts on the first 3 floors. The ship also contains a galley underneath the main deck. The name “Lac Du Saint Sacrement” comes from the original name of Lake George until it was renamed in 1755 after King George II. Lac du Saint Sacrement, the original name of the Lake until the English won the French and Indian War in 1756, was given by Father Isaac Jogues, a French Canadian missionary who found the lake in 1646.

== History ==
In the 1970s the Lake George Steamboat Company saw a demand for a ship that could carry more passengers, serve more and better food, as well as entertain more passengers. So, the company took action and started construction of the biggest ship it had ever made in Baldwin Shipyard. The blueprints used for the boat were based on the Peter Stuyvesant, a boat that used to run the Hudson River until it sank during the Blizzard of 1978. Robert Simons was the marine architect that refined and designed the boat. The final design ended up being ¾ the size of the Peter Stuyvesant boat on which it was based. This left the boat measuring 189 feet and 6 inches with a beam of 40 feet, making it the largest boat to ever sail the inland waters of the state of New York. When it came time to name the boat, it was decided that it would be named the same as Lake George was initially in 1646 by Isaac Jogues. The Catholic hierarchy approved the name, the Lac du Saint Sacrement which means Lake of the Blessed Sacrament in French, as well. On June 15, 1989, a ceremony was held to christen the boat. And after many speeches and a blessing by Bishop Raymond Kalisz, the Bishop of the Roman Catholic diocese of Wewak, Papua New Guinea, a bottle of champagne was smashed against the ship's capstan head to officially christen the vessel the Lac Du Saint Sacrement.

== Construction ==
The keel of the ship, considered to be the most important part of boat construction other than its launching, was installed in June 1979. After, small groups of men worked every summer to frame and plate the hull. A bow-thruster tunnel and unit was put in the bow section. Then, propulsion shafting, propellers and rudders were all placed in the stern. When the hull was ready to be launched in September 1987, the Mohican II towed the hull to the Steel Pier in the Lake George Village. The Steel Pier is where the engines were installed as well as general outfitting and the finishing touches of the superstructure.

== Cruises ==
The ship started operation in May 1989. It is the youngest boat of the fleet behind the Mohican II and the Minne HaHa. The ship has many different cruises available for customers including brunch, lunch, and dinner. All cruises have food, live entertainment, and live narration of the nearby sites of interest along the lake. The menu is varied and subject to change day to day. All cruises on the Lac du Saint Sacrement are also handicap accessible.

=== Fireworks ===
These cruises offer the privilege of seeing the fireworks of fireworks nights from a much closer perspective on the actual lake compared to the lake shore. Live entertainment and a dance floor is another attraction of the cruise. The cruise runs just over an hour and is available from early July to late August. The cruise leaves at 9:15 PM. Tickets for Children that are between the ages of 3 and 11 are $11. Adult tickets are for ages 12 and up and cost $22.

=== Lakefront ===
Lakefront Hourly cruises are offered on both the Mohican II and the Lac du Saint Sacrement. They are offered in the Spring and Fall from morning to evening and focus on the beauty of the surrounding Adirondack Mountain Range. Adult tickets are $14.50, and Children tickets are $7.

=== Brunch ===
The brunch cruises are 2-hour cruises that run from Monday to Saturday from mid-May to late October. Boarding opens at 11:00 AM and the vessel departs at 12:00 PM. Adult tickets are $46, and children tickets are $17.

=== Luncheon ===
The luncheon cruises are 2-hour cruises that run from mid-May to late-October from Monday to Saturday. Boarding opens at 11:00 AM and the vessel departs at 12:00 PM. The menu sometimes includes soup du jour, freshly carved deli sandwiches with a choice of ham, beef, or turkey, assorted breads, or assorted cheeses. Adult tickets are $36, and Children tickets are $14.

=== Dinner ===
The dinner cruises are 2-hour 15-minute cruises that run from mid-June to early September Monday through Saturday. Passengers may start boarding the ship at 5:30 and the boat leaves at 6:30. In addition to the standard menu, the buffet may also consist of vegetable du jour, potatoes, pasta, or rice. Adult tickets cost $70.50 while children tickets are $30.50.

=== Specialty ===
There are also many other specialty cruises offered on the Lac du Saint Sacrement including Oktoberfest, New Years, Halloween, and Canadian Thanksgiving cruises. They all offer themed food and entertainment and vary in price.
