= Warren County Courthouse =

Warren County Courthouse may refer to:

- Warren County Courthouse (Georgia), Warrenton, Georgia
- Warren County Courthouse (Indiana), Williamsport, Indiana
- Warren County Courthouse (Iowa), Indianola, Iowa
- Warren County Courthouse (Kentucky), Bowling Green, Kentucky
- Old Warren County Courthouse, Vicksburg, Mississippi, home to the Old Courthouse Museum
- Warren County Courthouse (Mississippi), Vicksburg, Mississippi, a Mississippi Landmark
- Warren County Courthouse and Circuit Court Building, Warrenton, Missouri
- Warren County Courthouse (New Jersey), Belvidere, New Jersey
- Old Warren County Courthouse Complex, Lake George, New York
- Warren County Courthouse (Pennsylvania), Warren, Pennsylvania
- Warren County Courthouse (Virginia), Front Royal, Virginia
