= E. Stewart Jones, Jr. =

American lawyer (born 1941)

E. Stewart Jones Jr.
- Born: 1941 (age 84–85)
- Education: Williams College; Albany Law School
- Occupation: Lawyer (1966–2024)
- Known for: Criminal defense and personal-injury litigation in the Capital District
- Spouses: Penny Jones (died 2000); Kimberly Jones (m. 2008)
- Children: 3
- Relatives: E. Stewart Jones Sr. (father); Abbott H. Jones (grandfather)

E. Stewart "Stu" Jones Jr. (born 1941) is a former American trial lawyer from Troy, New York, known for criminal defense and personal-injury work in New York's Capital District. He was the third generation of his family to lead a Troy law practice founded by his grandfather in 1898, and in 2015 he merged it with the litigation firm Hacker Murphy LLP to form E. Stewart Jones Hacker Murphy LLP. His clients included former New York State Senate Majority Leader Joseph Bruno, who was acquitted at his 2014 federal corruption retrial. In July 2024, having admitted to professional misconduct involving client escrow funds at his former firm, Jones resigned from the bar and was disbarred by the Appellate Division, Third Department, in a 3–2 decision.

== Honors ==
Jones was elected to the American College of Trial Lawyers, the International Academy of Trial Lawyers, the Inner Circle of Advocates and the International Society of Barristers; in 2014 Super Lawyers magazine described him as the only New York lawyer outside New York City elected to all four. He was listed in The Best Lawyers in America from its first edition in 1983, and in May 2016 he was inducted into the Tech Valley Business Hall of Fame. According to WRGB, Super Lawyers ranked him the top personal-injury lawyer in upstate New York in 2017 and 2018. Albany Law School awarded him its trustees' gold medal. In 2025 the Albany County Bar Association gave him, jointly with Janet M. Silver, the President's Award presented at its annual Court of Appeals Dinner.

Jones was also a fellow of the American Board of Criminal Lawyers, the American Board of Professional Liability Attorneys, the American Bar Foundation, the New York Bar Foundation, the Federal Bar Foundation, and the Litigation Counsel of America.

In 2006 the Capital District Trial Lawyers Association gave Jones its Daniel Mahoney Award. In November 2008 the University at Albany Foundation gave him a Community Laureate award, one of its Citizen Laureate honors. Senior Services of Albany gave him its Third Age Achievement Award in Law on May 6, 2016.

== Early life and education ==
=== Family background ===
Jones's grandfather, Abbott H. Jones (1876–1939), was born in Troy and founded the family law practice there in 1898. He was judge of the Troy Police Court from 1900 to 1908. He was elected Rensselaer County district attorney in November 1908 and again in November 1920. He resigned in 1922 and returned to private practice.

In 1931 Abbott Jones was co-counsel, with Daniel H. Prior of Albany, for the bootlegger Jack "Legs" Diamond, who had been charged with five counts of assault, coercion and kidnapping over the beating of the trucker Grover Parks and whose case Prior had moved from Greene County to Troy. Diamond was tried twice in Troy that year and acquitted both times. The second jury acquitted him on December 17, 1931, and he was shot dead in an Albany rooming house early the next morning. According to his grandson, Diamond offered to pay Jones's $30,000 fee in cash after the verdict, and Jones told him to settle it at the office the next day. Abbott Jones died in a Troy hospital in June 1939, at 63. He was survived by his wife, Elizabeth, a daughter and two sons, Abbott H. Jones Jr. and Edward Stewart Jones.

Edward Stewart Jones Sr. graduated from Williams College and Albany Law School. He took over his father's firm in 1939 and practiced in partnership with Arthur L. Rosen. He was a judge of the Troy City Court from 1947 to 1950. In 1952 he defended John Merrill, a former construction superintendent on the Troy High School project, on a bail-jumping charge. The trial drew an estimated 500 spectators, and Merrill was acquitted. Jones Sr. represented plaintiffs in medical-negligence and product-liability cases. The Inner Circle of Advocates, which admitted him as a member, credits him with the first multimillion-dollar verdict in New York, won in 1978 for a young man left quadriplegic after a crash it attributed to a defective Chrysler ball joint. He died in Troy on April 17, 2001, at 89.

=== Childhood and education ===
Jones was born in December 1941, three days before the attack on Pearl Harbor. He grew up on Troy's east side and attended a local Catholic school. His parents divorced when he was in eighth grade. Instead of going on to La Salle Institute with his friends, he was sent to The Albany Academy, where he played football, hockey and baseball and met his future wife, Penny. He majored in American history and literature at Williams College, which his father had also attended. In his senior year his father told him to choose between law school and the draft, and he enrolled at Albany Law School.

== Legal career ==
Jones was admitted to the New York bar in 1966. After a year in the National Guard, he joined the Rensselaer County District Attorney's office, where he tried his first murder case in 1969. He joined his father's firm in 1970 and took over its leadership in 1983. A 2014 profile in Super Lawyers magazine reported that he had won the first $1 million verdict in Schenectady County and the region's first $1 million medical-malpractice verdict, and that the firm had recovered more than $100 million in personal-injury cases. His brother, W. Farley Jones, practiced at the firm for more than 30 years.

In late 2014, Jones announced that his firm, then 116 years old with offices in Troy, Albany and Saratoga, would merge with Hacker Murphy LLP, an Albany- and Latham-based litigation firm led by James E. Hacker and David R. Murphy. The merger took effect on January 1, 2015, and the combined firm was named E. Stewart Jones Hacker Murphy LLP. The two firms had previously worked together representing families of victims of the 2005 Ethan Allen boating accident. In 2024 the firm removed Jones's name and became Hacker Murphy LLP.

== Famous cases ==
In 1988, Jones represented former Major League Baseball umpire Dave Pallone in questioning related to an investigation of a sex ring involving teen-age boys by Saratoga Springs, New York District Attorney David Wait.

Jones represented former Washington County, New York supervisor William L. Nikas in 1994 against allegations of corruption in negotiations for the construction of a trash burning plant.

In a highly dramatic situation in Albany, New York politics, Jones zealously represented J. Michael Bosley, a top Aide and counsel to former speaker of the New York State Assembly Sheldon Silver, against accusations of rape in August of 2003.

Jones represented Jon Romano in his 2004 firing of a two-gauge shotgun at students and teachers inside Columbia High School in East Greenbush, New York.

Jones joined fellow attorney Jim Hacker to represent the families of 20 individuals who perished following the Ethan Allen boating accident on Lake George, New York in 2005.

Jones represented Antonia Novello, the former U.S. Surgeon General, after an Albany County grand jury indicted her in May 2009 on 20 counts (four felonies and 16 misdemeanors) of using state Health Department employees to run personal errands while she was New York's health commissioner. She pleaded not guilty at her arraignment. That June she pleaded guilty to a single felony, filing a false instrument, and in August Judge Stephen Herrick sentenced her under the plea deal to $22,500 in restitution, a $5,000 fine and 250 hours at a clinic for the uninsured. Jones told reporters afterward that the crime was an "administrative processing offense".

He also defended Clement Campana, the Troy City Council president charged in the city's absentee-ballot fraud case. Campana was indicted in December 2011 on four felony counts of illegal voting, a felony count of falsifying business records and misdemeanor conspiracy, all tied to forged absentee ballots in the 2009 Working Families Party primary. The case never reached trial. After two other defendants were acquitted, special prosecutor Trey Smith asked to drop the charges against Campana and Councilman Gary Galuski, and Judge George J. Pulver Jr. dismissed them on March 14, 2013.

Jones defended Timothy M. McGinn, co-founder of the Albany brokerage McGinn, Smith & Co., when McGinn and his partner David L. Smith went on trial in federal court in Utica in January 2013 on fraud, conspiracy and tax charges. William Dreyer represented Smith. Jones opened by telling the jury the prosecution rested on "a fundamental misunderstanding of the business at McGinn and Smith", and McGinn took the stand in his own defense. The jury convicted McGinn on 27 of 29 counts and Smith on 15. That August Judge David N. Hurd sentenced McGinn to 15 years and Smith to 10, fined them $100,000 and $50,000, and ordered about $6.3 million in forfeiture and $6 million in restitution.

Jones successfully defended Joseph Bruno in 2014 in retrying corruption charges that could have led to two years of jail time.

Jones represented former state Assemblyman William Scarborough to ensure his sentencing. Scarborough was a Democrat from Queens who resigned and pleaded guilty to federal corruption charges in 2015. This legal representation resulted in Scarborough being sentenced to federal instead of state prison.

The same year he represented Melinda "Mindy" Wormuth, the former Halfmoon town supervisor, who pleaded guilty that August to federal extortion and false-statement charges and, in Saratoga County Court, to fourth-degree grand larceny for stealing from her campaign fund. Judge Gary Sharpe sentenced her on December 10 to a year and a day in federal prison; four days later Judge Matthew Sypniewski gave her a concurrent 10-month jail term and ordered $1,250 in restitution.

== Civic and philanthropic activities ==
Jones served on the board of directors of the University at Albany Foundation from 1988 to 1998. He also sat on the boards of the Saratoga Performing Arts Center, the Little Sisters of the Poor and the Teresian House Foundation.

Jones chaired the board of trustees of The Albany Academies, and the school's magazine listed him as president of the board in late 2014. In 1996 he and his first wife, Constance "Penny" Jones, endowed two scholarships at Albany Academy for Girls, one named for a daughter who graduated from the school in 1997 and one for Penny Jones. He later established the Penny Jones Scholarship Fund at The Albany Academy for students who could not otherwise afford to attend. He led capital campaigns for the school.

Jones has twice chaired the Albany Law School board of trustees. The board elected him chairman in May 2007, and Mary Ann Cody McGinn succeeded him on July 1, 2010. He led capital campaigns for the law school, which lists him as an emeritus trustee.

In 2004 Jones and Arthur Siegel started the Justice for All campaign, the annual fund of the Legal Aid Society of Northeastern New York. He co-chaired the campaign with Kim Williams in 2008, when its goal was $200,000. He was president of the society's board of directors in 2013 and 2014. He chaired the campaign in 2018 and co-chaired it in 2019 with David Cost of Barclay Damon. The society gave him its Equal Access to Justice Award.

Penny Jones was diagnosed with ovarian cancer in 1997 and died in 2000. In the spring of 2008 the University at Albany named a laboratory in its East Campus Cancer Research Center in recognition of Jones's gifts to the center, and the center's Wall of Memory and Hope carries a plaque in memory of Penny Jones. The Junior League of Albany, which opened a Gilda's Club in Albany in 2005, named Jones among the donors it secured for the club. He led a capital campaign for Gilda's Club and received the Spirit of Hope Award from Gilda's Club of the Capital Region.

Jones led capital campaigns for the restoration of the Cathedral of the Immaculate Conception in Albany, and the Roman Catholic Diocese of Albany gave him a service award. He received the Partners in Literacy Award from Literacy Volunteers of Rensselaer County. The College of Saint Rose honored him at its Community of Excellence scholarship luncheon on June 23, 2011; a State Senate resolution marking the occasion cited his support for construction of the college's Esther Massry Gallery.

In 2013, Jones represented the family of Clement Clarke Moore in a mock dispute over who wrote "A Visit from St. Nicholas", a poem published anonymously in 1823 by the Troy Sentinel. The mock courtroom drama reached national audiences when a Hallmark movie was made about the case, Twas the Night Before Christmas, as a follow-on to the play The Trial Before Christmas.

In 2014 Jones co-chaired the Capital District Community Gardens' campaign for its Urban Grow Center in Troy. He and his wife Kimberly have established nine endowed scholarships at six schools.

== Resignation and disbarment ==
In the summer of 2024, the New York Supreme Court, Appellate Division, Third Department disbarred Jones in what was described as a rare split court decision in favor of accepting his application to voluntarily resign from legal practice. Jones admitted to misappropriation of client funds, improper bookkeeping and commingling of funds.

Jones was described as being "the gold standard for the local bar" by longtime friend and top attorney William Dreyer. In response to the end of his former mentor's legal career, notable Capital Region Criminal Defense Attorney George LaMarche said, "He has the support of this legal community."

In a show of that support, well-known Capital Regional criminal defense attorney Mike McDermott said that Jones was "a legend, an icon in this profession... not a hyperbole." In reference to young attorneys watching Jones trying a case, McDermott said, "It's almost like a group of painters staring up through the scaffolding to get a glimpse of Michelangelo painting the Sistine Chapel -- I mean he was that much of a craftsman and a master of the art of advocacy." Additionally, members of the non-legal community wrote letters to the editor of the largest regional newspaper, the Times Union of Albany, in his defense.

== Personal life ==
Jones met his first wife, Penny, while attending The Albany Academy; they had three children. She died of ovarian cancer in 2000. He married Kimberly Jones in 2008.

== See also ==
- E. Stewart Jones Hacker Murphy
