= St. James' Episcopal Church (Lake City, Florida) =

Coordinates: 30.168852°N 82.662695°W

St. James’ Episcopal Church is an historic Episcopal church located at 2423 SW Bascom Norris Drive in Lake City, Florida, United States. The church is in the Episcopal Diocese of Florida.

== History ==
The first record from the Lake City Episcopal Church Register is in 1870, signed by the Reverend C. William Camp, Rector, and the Right Reverend John Freeman Young, Second Bishop of Florida. A register entry by Rev. Camp on February 26, 1871 describes the rectory in Lake City and the Peabody School under Church supervision, later known as St. James Academy.

The Rev. Charles Snowden built the original St. James Episcopal Church in 1880 with his own money and labor at the corner of South Alachua & West Nassau Streets. The Rectory and St. James Academy were next door. Bishop Young consecrated St. James Church on the second Sunday after Christmas in 1884, according to Diocesan records. Rev. Snowden served as St. James Rector from 1871 to 1886.

In 1898, to serve and be accessible to the students at Florida Agricultural College (predecessor of the University of Florida which moved to Gainesville in 1906), the church was moved to the corner of South Marion and East Brown Streets. The current Rectory was constructed at that time on a second lot next door. The location was on the main roadway through town, and many church members lived nearby and walked to services. Lake City's population was just a few thousand. A school for the parish was constructed between the Rectory and the Sanctuary a couple of years later. The Parish Hall replaced the school in 1926.

After Rev. Snowden left, the next 80 years saw a succession of Rectors. Only two, Rev. Walter T. Carvell and Rev. John Banks, served more than a few years. There was little or no growth in the Parish. St. James remained a Mission until 1960, which meant that the church relied upon the Diocese of Florida for financial support.

== Growth ==
Reverend Doctor William McLaurine Hall, known as "Mac", became Rector of St. James' in 1966. The Episcopal church that had remained virtually unchanged since the advent of the twentieth century slowly began to grow. A few members started attending Cursillo and were moved by the Holy Spirit. Their enthusiasm caught on and more families with children began attending. The vestry recognized the growth trend, but there was no room for any type of building expansion on-site. Less critical, but still important, was the lack of nearby parking that had been a problem for many years, and the absence of an area for outdoor activities. At the end of 1968, the building committee recommended the purchase of a ten-acre parcel on the south side of town near the city limits. The following year, the vestry purchased the land for $30,000. The church began to save for the considerable expense of moving their buildings.

Finally in August 1987, the parish sold their 2 city lots to the next door neighbor and moved the church (the second time for the Sanctuary) to its present location, just off State Road 47, a distance of about 4 miles (6.4 km). The Sanctuary and Parish Hall were moved first, followed by the Christian Education Wing, and finally, the Rectory. The new property was 10 2/3 acres (4.3 ha), compared to less than 1/2 acre (0.20 ha) in town. It took several years to settle into the new location, and Rev. Hall retired in 1994 after 28 years as Rector at St. James. He left before plans were finalized for a bigger sanctuary. The church had been moved for almost 10 years before the parish was in a position to build a bigger building, but it finally happened. St. James Episcopal Church members consecrated their new sanctuary on March 9, 2003. The Right Reverend Stephen Hays Jecko, Seventh Bishop of the Episcopal Diocese of Florida officiated the ceremony and was assisted by the Rev. Dr. William McLaurine Hall, Rector Emeritus and the Rev. Dr. Jeff Robinson, St. James Rector. The new sanctuary became the primary worship center for the St. James family, but the historical old building was not destroyed, nor abandoned. It was used for smaller services, Sunday school classes and the Wednesday midday service. Reverend Jimmie Hunsinger was named as the church's first deacon in 2000.

== Current ==
Rev. Susan Q. Claytor became the new rector of St. James Episcopal Church of Lake City in early 2007. Claytor was born in Atlanta but grew up in Jacksonville, Florida. She previously served at the Episcopal Church of Our Saviour of Jacksonville in a lay capacity. When Claytor left in August 2008, Rev. Michael N. Armstrong began serving as supply priest, then priest-in-charge. She was named Rector in mid-2009.

== See also ==
- St. James Episcopal Church (disambiguation)
