= Hacker Murphy LLP =

Litigation law firm in New York's Capital District

- Headquarters: 22 Corporate Woods Boulevard, Suite 404, Albany, New York
- No. of offices: 4
- No. of attorneys: 16 (2026)
- Major practice areas: Personal injury, medical malpractice, criminal defense, commercial litigation, trust and estate litigation, alternative dispute resolution
- Key people: John F. Harwick (managing partner); James E. Hacker (senior counsel)
- Date founded: 1990 (as Hacker & Murphy, LLP)
- Founder: James E. Hacker; David R. Murphy
- Company type: Limited liability partnership
- Website: www.hackermurphy.com

Hacker Murphy LLP is a litigation law firm in the Capital District of New York, with offices in Albany, Troy, Saratoga Springs and Schenectady. James E. Hacker and David R. Murphy founded it in 1990 as Hacker & Murphy, LLP. On January 1, 2015, it merged with the Troy firm of E. Stewart Jones Jr., a practice his grandfather had started in 1898, and the combined firm took the name E. Stewart Jones Hacker Murphy LLP. Jones left the firm in May 2024 during a disciplinary investigation into escrow accounts at his pre-merger firm, and the partnership resumed the Hacker Murphy name that year. John F. Harwick succeeded Hacker as managing partner in January 2026.

== History ==
=== Hacker & Murphy (1990–2014) ===
Hacker graduated from Hamilton College in 1981 and from Albany Law School in 1984. Court papers from 2006 list Hacker & Murphy, LLP at 7 Airport Park Boulevard in Latham. By late 2014 the firm had 11 attorneys and offices in Albany and Latham. Its work centered on commercial litigation, property tax litigation and employment litigation.

=== The Jones firm (1898–2014) ===
Abbott H. Jones founded the Jones firm in Troy in 1898. He later served as Troy's city attorney, as a city judge and as district attorney. The practice passed to his son, E. Stewart Jones Sr., and then to his grandson, E. Stewart Jones Jr. Jones Jr. was admitted to the bar in 1966. Before the merger his firm had offices in Troy, Albany and Saratoga Springs. It worked on matters from Poughkeepsie to the Canadian border. Its building at 28 Second Street in Troy stands next to the Troy Savings Bank Music Hall.

=== Merger with E. Stewart Jones ===
According to Hacker, Jones once asked him to take over a case that Jones could not try because of a scheduling conflict. After that case settled, the two discussed combining Hacker Murphy's commercial and mediation practice with Jones's criminal defense work. Hacker told the Times Union in December 2014 that the lawyers had been talking seriously about a merger for more than a year and a half. Jones, then 73, said the merger "assures us that we'll be here for another 100 years". He also said it was not a sign that he planned to retire. Hacker was 55 at the time. Jones later told Super Lawyers that the merger "was a lifesaver" and called Hacker "the top gun of his generation of litigators".

The merger took effect on January 1, 2015. Hacker became managing partner and Murphy a partner of the combined firm. The Hacker Murphy side added a Schenectady office to the Jones firm's offices in Troy, Albany and Saratoga Springs. In 2023 the firm marked 125 years since the Jones firm's founding.

=== Jones's departure and return to the Hacker Murphy name ===
In January 2019 a dishonored-check report was issued on an escrow account of E. Stewart Jones PLLC, Jones's pre-merger firm. The resulting audit covered seven years of the firm's escrow accounts. The Attorney Grievance Committee for the Third Judicial Department then brought nine charges of professional misconduct against Jones. They included misappropriation of client funds, commingling and improper bookkeeping. On May 21, 2024, the Times Union reported that Jones's biography and photograph had been removed from the firm's website. A source close to the matter told the paper that he had parted ways with the firm the week before.

On July 18, 2024, the Appellate Division, Third Department, voted 3–2 to accept Jones's resignation while the proceeding was pending, which carried disbarment. Justices Sharon Aarons, Molly Reynolds Fitzgerald and Eddie McShan formed the majority. Justices Stan Pritzker and Lisa Fisher dissented. They would have rejected the resignation, and they cited Jones's long career, his remorse and his repayment of the funds. In a statement issued through his lawyer, William Dreyer, Jones said the violations "were solely related to accounts used by my prior firm before its 2015 merger with Hacker Murphy LLP". He also said that every client of that firm "was paid in full". By then the firm had dropped Jones from its name and was again called Hacker Murphy LLP. Its statement said the decision "brings an end to an impressive, storied 58-year career" and noted that the misconduct predated the merger.

=== Leadership change ===
On January 13, 2026, the firm announced that its partners had elected John F. Harwick managing partner. He succeeded Hacker, who stayed with the firm as senior counsel handling medical malpractice, personal injury, commercial litigation and alternative dispute resolution. The announcement put Harwick's time at the firm at 28 years and the firm's size at 16 attorneys. Harwick's firm biography gives his tenure as 25 years.

== Offices and real estate ==
In April 2022 the firm opened a downtown Albany office at 41 State Street. The January 2026 leadership announcement said the firm would move its headquarters to Corporate Woods in Albany during 2026. It also said the firm would open a satellite office in Hudson. By late 2026 the firm listed its Albany office at 22 Corporate Woods Boulevard and its Troy office at 64 Second Street.

== Notable cases ==
=== Hackert v. First Alert ===
Hacker & Murphy and the Minneapolis firm Robins, Kaplan, Miller & Ciresi represented Sheila Hackert and her son John in a product liability suit against First Alert, Inc. and BRK Brands, Inc. A 2001 house fire near Albany had killed William Hackert Jr., 56, and his daughter Christine, 31, after the family's ionization smoke detector failed to sound. A federal jury in Utica heard the case from April 3 to 21, 2006. It found the detector's design defective and the manufacturer negligent. The jury awarded $3 million for each decedent's conscious pain and suffering, along with economic damages and $500,000 in punitive damages. It assigned 35 percent of the fault to the plaintiffs. On August 11, 2006, Judge David N. Hurd ordered a new trial on pain-and-suffering damages unless the plaintiffs accepted reductions to $1 million and $2 million. In 2008 the Second Circuit (No. 06-4387-cv) affirmed the judgment, which after remittiturs awarded $2.8 million in compensatory and punitive damages to Sheila and John Hackert.

=== Ethan Allen litigation ===
On October 2, 2005, the tour boat Ethan Allen capsized on Lake George with 47 passengers aboard, and 20 of them died. Hacker was lead counsel for the victims' families and the survivors. In June 2008 they reached a confidential settlement with Shoreline Cruises, its affiliate Quirk's Marine Rentals and the boat's captain, Richard Paris. A suit against the Lake George Steamboat Company settled in September 2010. A claim against the state, which challenged its inspection and certification of the boat, reached the New York Court of Appeals. The court dismissed it unanimously in November 2012. The boat's owner had paid premiums on a $2 million liability policy that turned out to be worthless. In 2011 federal prosecutors in Houston charged the insurer's principals with fraud.

=== United States v. Bruno ===
Shortly before the merger, Jones and Albany lawyer William Dreyer defended former State Senate Majority Leader Joseph Bruno at his retrial on federal fraud charges. On May 16, 2014, a jury before Chief Judge Gary L. Sharpe acquitted him.

=== Wage class actions ===
On January 9, 2014, Hacker Murphy attorney Ryan M. Finn sued Stewart's Shops in the Northern District of New York (No. 7:14-cv-33) on behalf of Holly Gregory, an hourly employee. In September 2016 the court let the case proceed as a class action over unpaid call-in pay for store meetings and as a collective action over unpaid overtime, and it dismissed the meal-break claims. According to The Daily Gazette, about 34,000 current and former employees were offered the chance to opt in, and 146 did. More than 33,000 notices went to members of the call-in class. Stewart's agreed to pay $675,000. Of that, 33 percent ($225,000) went to the plaintiffs' lawyers, and each of the three named plaintiffs received $5,000. Senior Judge Thomas McAvoy granted final approval on January 15, 2020.

In August 2015 the firm, with Harwick as lead counsel, filed a federal class action against the New York State Thruway Authority on behalf of about 250 nonunion management and confidential employees. The suit alleged that a November 2008 board resolution had granted them raises of 3 percent a year for 2008, 2009 and 2010 and 4 percent for 2011. It said the raises were never paid and that the board rescinded them on May 18, 2015. The complaint relied on New York's Wage Theft Prevention Act, breach of contract and constitutional claims. The firm put the unpaid wages at more than $10 million and the lost retirement benefits at more than $5 million. The case was assigned to Judge Lawrence E. Kahn. The Times Union reported that the suit sought at least $15 million in lost wages and retirement benefits and another $30 million in damages.

=== Schoharie limousine crash ===
The firm represented the estate of Robert Dyson, one of 20 people killed in the 2018 Schoharie limousine crash. On December 19, 2019, the estate joined two coordinated suits. One was filed in state Supreme Court in Montgomery County against the limousine company's owners and Mavis Discount Tire. The other was a claim against the state. Firm attorney David Iversen represented families in the civil cases. By October 2026, 19 of the 20 victims' estates had settled with Mavis.

== Notable attorneys ==
- James E. Hacker, co-founder; managing partner from 2015 to 2026, then senior counsel. He chaired Albany Law School's board of trustees from July 1, 2017. At that time he was also president of the Albany County Bar Association and a regional vice president of the New York State Trial Lawyers. He is a fellow of the American College of Trial Lawyers and a past president of the New York State Academy of Trial Lawyers and of the Legal Aid Society of Northeastern New York. According to the New York Academy of Mediators & Arbitrators, he has served as mediator or arbitrator in more than 1,000 cases. Albany Law School gave him its Distinguished Alumni Award in 2016.
- David R. Murphy, co-founder.
- John F. Harwick, managing partner since 2026. He has practiced in upstate New York since 1995. The firm reports that Best Lawyers named him plaintiffs' personal injury "Lawyer of the Year" for 2025 and 2026.
- E. Stewart Jones Jr., principal from 2015 to 2024; disbarred in 2024.
