= Crandall Marine Railway =

- U.S. National Register of Historic Places
- Location within New York Location within the United States
- Location: 11 Dry Dock Ln., Ticonderoga, New York
- Coordinates: 43°48′27″N 73°26′55″W
- Area: 0.3 acres (0.12 ha)
- Built: 1927
- NRHP reference No.: 11000251
- Added to NRHP: March 31, 2010

Crandall Marine Railway is a historic dry dock facility located at Heart's Bay, 3 miles (4.8 km) southwest of Ticonderoga in Essex County, New York. It was built in September 1927 by the Lake George Steamboat Company as its primary facility for building, repairing and maintaining its fleet. Contributing structures on the property are the head house, tracks and a cradle.

It was listed on the National Register of Historic Places in 2011.
