= St. James Episcopal Church (Ormond Beach, Florida) =

Church in Ormond Beach, Florida, US

Coordinates: 29.28864°N 81.04526°W

St. James’ Episcopal Church is an historic church located at 38 South Halifax Drive in Ormond Beach, Florida.

== See also ==
- St. James Episcopal Church (disambiguation)

St. James Historical Tidbits 1890-1957

“The History of St. James Episcopal Church” written by the Rev. Dorsey G. Smith, Jr. for St. James Centennial Celebration 1890–1990.

The idea for St. James Episcopal Church was initiated by two women staying at the Ormond Hotel. The efforts of these two unknown women resulted in St. James being organized as a mission of St,. Mary's Episcopal Church, Daytona Beach in 1890 and services were held in the Ormond Beach Union Church on North Beach.

In 1891 property was donated on the southeast corner of East Granada and Halifax Ave. and a small church was erected. In 1920 church members decided that Granada had gotten too busy and too noisy and the church was moved to its present location on Halifax Drive and a new chancel, sacristy and rector's study were added. Services were held only during the fall and winter months.

In 1947 the Rev. George W. Rutter became Priest in Charge of the mission church and then in 1954 when the mission became a parish he was instituted as the first rector of St. James Episcopal Church. At that time services were held year round and an official Altar Guild was organized. In 1955 Father Rutter started the St. James Parish Day School with six students in the first kindergarten class and later added a parish house with several class rooms on the north side of the church. Father Rutter retired in 1957.

In 1962, the present church was built incorporating the 1891 church into the new building now known as the chapel. The old church is still used for various services
