= St. James Catholic Church =

St. James Catholic Church, or variations including and Cemetery or other, may refer to:

== Ireland ==
- St James Catholic Church, Dublin

== United Kingdom ==
- St James's, Spanish Place, London

== United States ==
- St. James Catholic Church (Savannah, Georgia)
- St. James Catholic Church and Cemetery (Lemont, Illinois), listed on the National Register of Historic Places (NRHP) in Cook County, Illinois
- St. James' Catholic Church (Louisville, Kentucky), NRHP-listed
- St. James Roman Catholic Church (Crosstown, Missouri)
- St. James Catholic Church (Woodbridge, New Jersey)
- St. James' Roman Catholic Church (Manhattan), New York
- St. James Catholic Church (Jamestown, North Dakota), listed on the NRHP in North Dakota
- Proto-Cathedral of St. James the Greater, Vancouver, Washington; known as St. James Catholic Church until 2013
- St. James Catholic Church and Cemetery (Menomonee Falls, Wisconsin), a historic church found eligible for listing on the National Register of Historic Places in Waukesha County
- St. James Roman Catholic Church (Lakewood, Ohio)
- St. James Catholic Church (Falls Church, Virginia)

== See also ==
- St. James' Church (disambiguation)
- St. James Episcopal Church (disambiguation)
