= St. James Episcopal Church (Lake George, New York) =

Historic church in New York, United States

- U.S. National Register of Historic Places
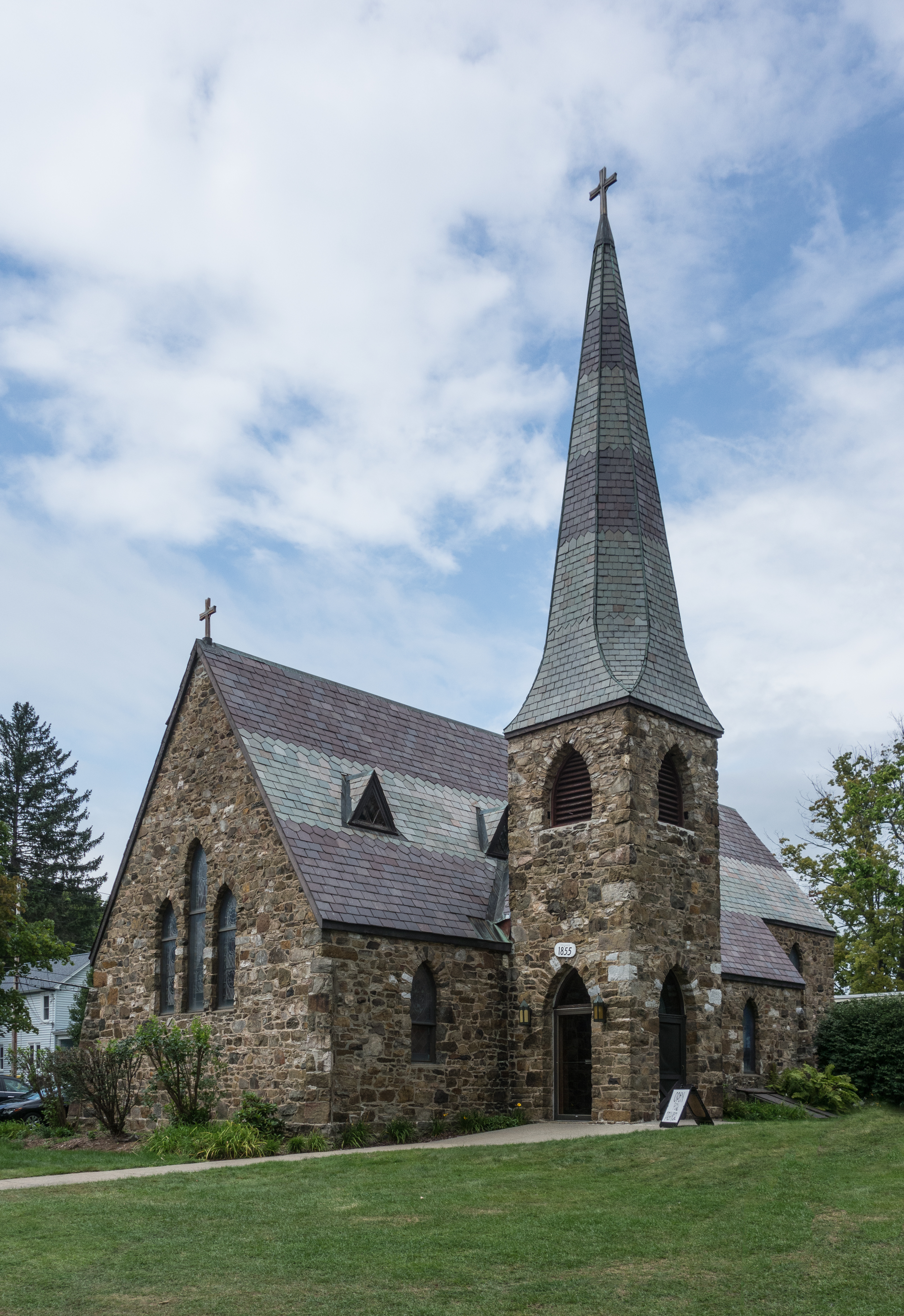

- Location within New York Location within the United States
- Location: 172 Ottawa Street, Lake George, New York
- Coordinates: 43°25′31″N 73°42′59″W
- Area: 0.72 acres (0.29 ha)
- Built: 1866-1867, 1909
- Architect: Crary, Robert Fulton; Peabody, Charles S.
- Architectural style: Gothic Revival, Tudor Revival
- NRHP reference No.: 13000915
- Added to NRHP: December 11, 2013

St. James Episcopal Church is a congregation of the Episcopal Church located at Lake George in Warren County, New York. It is noted for its historic parish church, completed in 1867. The church falls under the Episcopal Diocese of Albany.

== History ==
Episcopal worship was first brought to the area by British soldiers, but continuous worship is attested from about 1852, when local families would gather at the home of the Rev. Isaac H. Tuttle. The parish was established August 5, 1855, and worship held in the old courthouse on Canada Street. It is dedicated to Saint James, it is said, because Tuttle had been struck by the beauty of the scenery nearby, reminding him of James 1:17: "Every good and perfect gift comes down from above, from the Father of Lights." By 1857, the first, wooden church was erected. This church was blown down in 1866, after which the current stone church was commissioned.

== Architecture ==
St. James's historic parish church was built 1866–1867. A rectangular Gothic Revival style stone church, it has a high pitched gable roof and an offset square entrance tower topped by a tall octagonal spire. Attached to the church is the Tudor Revival style parish hall added in 1909.

It was listed on the National Register of Historic Places in 2013.

== See also ==
- National Register of Historic Places listings in Warren County, New York
