= St. James Episcopal Church (Greeneville, Tennessee) =

- 36.1643°N 82.8310°W
- Location: 107 West Church Street; Greeneville, Tennessee
- Denomination: Episcopal Church in the United States
- Churchmanship: Broad Church
- Website: www.stjamesgreeneville.org

History
- Former name: Greeneville Parish
- Founded: 1842
- Dedication: James, son of Zebedee
- Consecrated: August 11, 1850

Architecture
- Architect: George M. Spencer
- Architectural type: Carpenter Gothic

Administration
- Province: IV Southeast
- Diocese: Episcopal Diocese of East Tennessee
- Parish: St. James

Clergy
- Bishop: The Rt. Rev. Brian Lee Cole
- Rector: The Rev. Dr. Kenneth H. Saunders III

St. James Episcopal Church is an Episcopal church in Greeneville, Tennessee, United States.

The St. James congregation was organized in 1842 as the "Greeneville Parish, Greene County," by a small group of faithful Episcopalians who gathered for worship at the Greene County Courthouse. They were admitted to the 1848 Convention of the Episcopal Diocese of Tennessee, and subsequently were approved as a formal parish at the diocesan convention in July 1849.

The parish constructed its present church building in 1850, modified it in 1894, and further enlarged the structure in 1951. It is said to be one of Tennessee's oldest churches.

Between 1852 and 1901, St. James experienced great turmoil, having to close its doors for 18 months from 1873 to 1875. During this period St. James lapsed into mission status and did not regain its standing as a parish until 1957.

== Clergy ==
- 1850–52 The Rev. William H. Good, Vicar
- 1852–54 The Rev. W. P. Gahagan, Vicar
- 1854–60 The Rev. W. M. Steel, Vicar
- 1860–69 The Rev. William Mowbray, Vicar
- 1869–72 The Rev. T. Duncan, Vicar
- 1892–95 The Rev. Alexander C. Killeffer, Vicar
- 1927–37 The Ven. Henry T. Geiger, Archdeacon
- 1937–39 The Rev. Joseph L. Kellerman, Vicar
- 1939–45 The Rev. Charles Boyd Romain, Vicar
- 1945–48 The Rev. Eric Sutcliffe Greenwood, Vicar
- 1948–54 The Rev. Armand T. Eyler, Vicar
- 1954–56 The Rev. Thomas Hall Carson, Jr. Vicar
- 1957–61 The Rev. Warren Hugh Steele, Rector
- 1961–64 The Rev. Joseph T. Boulet, Rector
- 1964–81 The Rev. Robert Alan McMillan, Rector
- 1983–86 The Rev. Patrick C. Larkin, Rector
- 1986–98 The Rev. Rowland A. Clarkson, Rector
- 1999 The Rev. Willis W. H. Poyser, Rector
- 2002–04 The Rev. Jack Franklyn Wilcox, Jr., Rector
- 2005–16 The Rev. Carolyn W. Isley, Rector
- 2018–present The Rev. Dr. Kenneth H. Saunders III, Rector

== Mater Purissima ==
In 1950, the parish commissioned ecclesiastical artist Sister Mary Veronica (Community of St. Mary) to paint an altarpiece. The oil and gold painting, entitled Mater Purissima (Latin: purest mother), emulates the medieval styles of fifteenth-century European masters Friars Angelico and Lippi. The colors are traditional—red symbolizing the Kingship of Our Lord Jesus Christ, and blue representing the Purity of His Blessed Mother, Saint Mary.

Ralph Adams Cram (1863-1942), one of the preeminent ecclesiastical architects of the twentieth century, considered Mary Veronica as the greatest iconographer of his time. Cram once said that she was the only artist for whom he would willingly alter his designs. Sister Mary Veronica was born Ella McCullough and lived from 1864 to 1965. Her paintings are on display in select cathedrals and churches throughout the United States and overseas. Saint James is most fortunate to enjoy one of Mary Veronica's works.
