= Lake George Steamboat Company =

Steamboat company in the United States

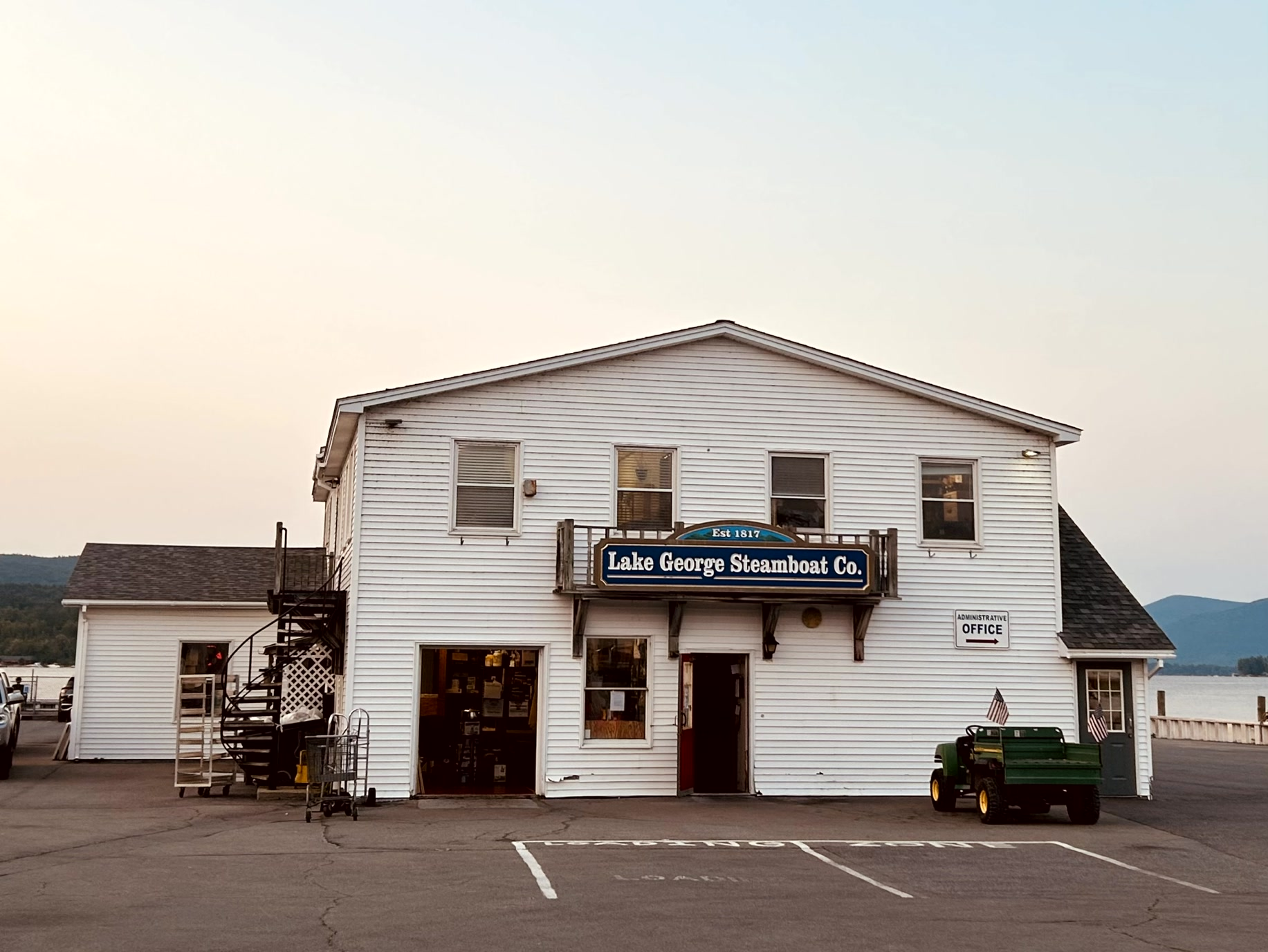
Lake George Steamboat Company Office

The Minne-Ha-Ha II steaming on Lake George

The Lake George Steamboat Company was incorporated in 1817 to operate steamboats on Lake George, New York. It is the oldest company in the Lake George region. The company operates steamboats that run the full length of Lake George between Ticonderoga at the north end of the lake and the village of Lake George at the south end of the lake.

== History ==
James Caldwell, founder of the village of Caldwell (later became Lake George Village) on the south end of Lake George was one of the company's founders. The company's first steamboat, the James Caldwell, was launched in 1817 and burned in 1821.

In 1823, the company launched the Mountaineer, its second steamship. Since then, the Company purchased, built, expanded and/or retrofitted over a dozen steamboats, including the Mohican II, listed on the National Register of Historic Places in 2010. From 1873 until 1943, it was owned and operated by the Delaware and Hudson Company.

In 1854, the company purchased the John Jay steamship, built by John J. Harris. In 1856, wind from a storm blew open the wood-fired steam engine of the boat, causing it to catch fire and capsize. Most passengers swam to shore, and 15 passengers and crew died.

In 1901, the company's steamboat the Ticonderoga caught fire and sunk in Lake George.

In 1927, the company opened the Crandall Marine Railway, which was listed on the National Register of Historic Places in 2011.

The Lake George Steamboat Company currently operates three boats: The Minne-Ha-Ha (meaning laughing waters) is the last steamboat operating on Lake George; the Mohican II, which has been in continuous service for over 100 years and is the oldest passenger vessel in the United States; and the Lac Du Saint Sacrement, the largest and most luxurious of the three. The Lac Du Saint Sacrament began operating in 1989, replacing the Ticonderoga, which had sailed the lake for the company for five decades prior.
