= St. James Episcopal Church (McLeansboro, Illinois) =

Historic church in Illinois, United States

- U.S. National Register of Historic Places
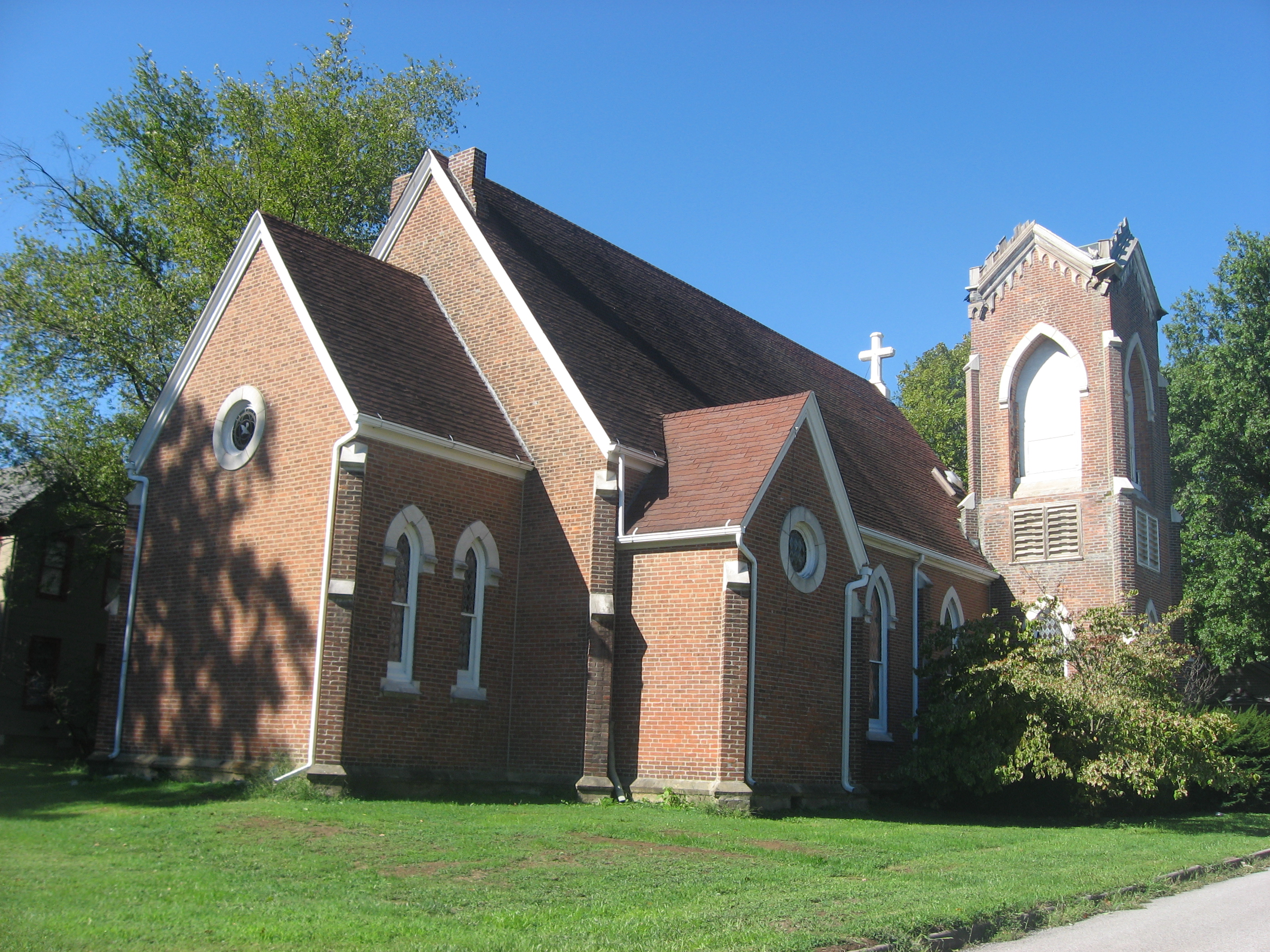
- Northern side of the church

- Location within Illinois Location within the United States
- Location: 111 N. Pearl St., McLeansboro, Illinois
- Coordinates: 38°5′35″N 88°32′10″W
- Area: less than one acre
- Built: 1882
- Architect: Thompson, W. G.
- Architectural style: Late Gothic Revival
- NRHP reference No.: 94001602
- Added to NRHP: January 24, 1995

The St. James Episcopal Church is an Episcopal church located at 111 N. Pearl St. in McLeansboro, Illinois. The Gothic Revival church was built in 1880–81. The brick church features a 50-foot (15 m) bell tower and a steep gable roof. The walls of the church are supported by brick buttresses with stone caps. The church includes a variety of stained glass windows, including a rose window in the western gable, a round window above the altar, and a tall central window depicting Jesus as the Good Shepherd. The majority of the church's remaining windows are Gothic pointed arch windows.

The church was listed on the National Register of Historic Places on January 24, 1995.
