= St. James Episcopal Church (Amesbury, Massachusetts) =

Church in Amesbury, Massachusetts, U.S.

Coordinates: 42.8555°N 70.9315°W

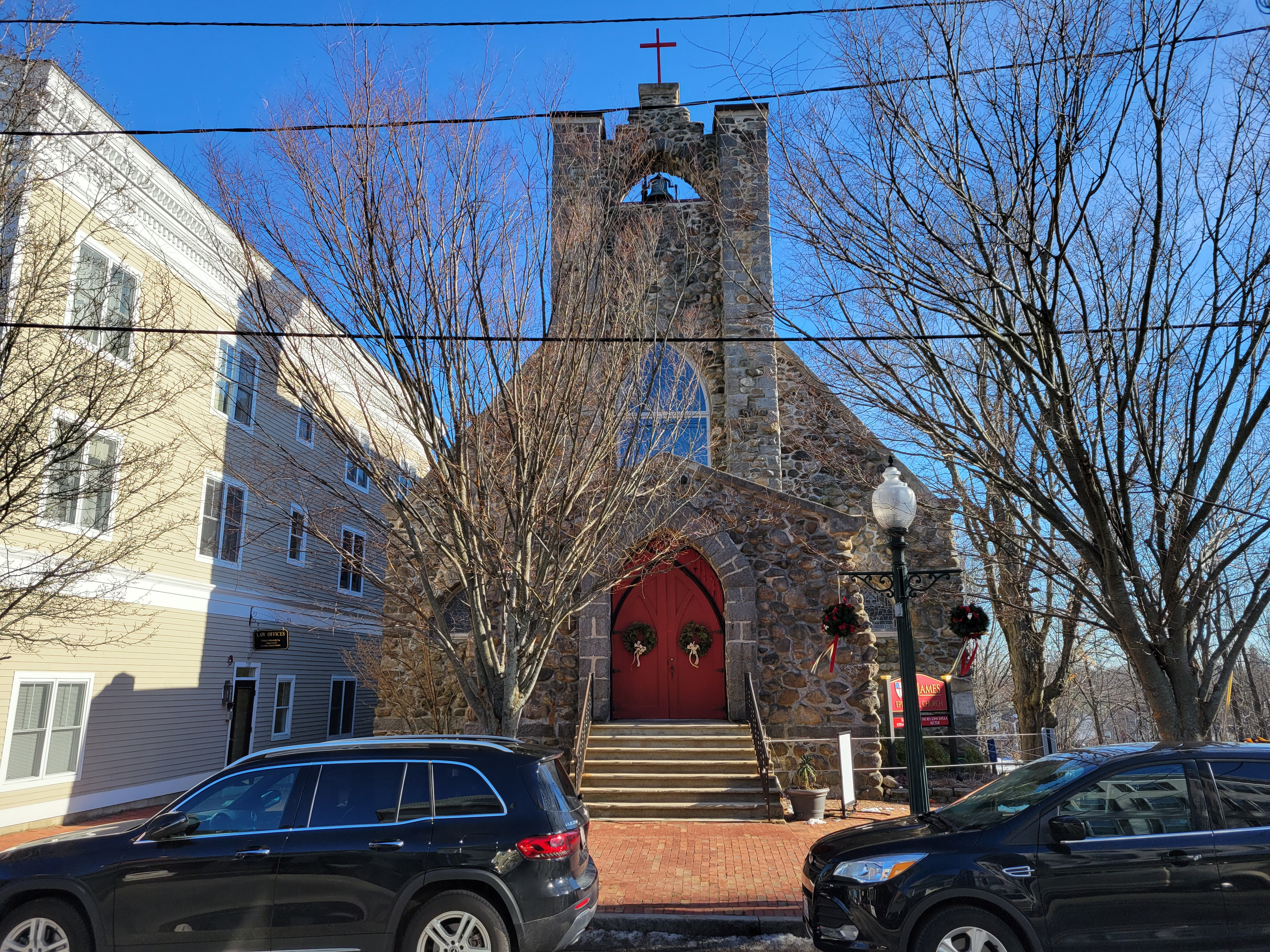
St. James Episcopal Church

St. James Episcopal Church is an historic parish in Amesbury, Massachusetts.

== History ==
St. James parish, in Amesbury, Massachusetts, has its roots in 18th century Anglican worship, and takes its present form from the Episcopal Church of the 19th century.

=== Early Anglican worship in Amesbury ===
Episcopalians were worshipping in Amesbury as early as 1711. The first Episcopal church was built around 1745, in what is now known as Union Cemetery (originally called Sandy Hill Cemetery).

Around 1760, King George III's Chapel, part of the Church of England, was built in the Pond Hill section of town, which was, at that time, the center of Amesbury. Services were held there until 1778, a time when one's political beliefs could change neighbors into enemies, as the Revolutionary War progressed. In this period, the Rev. Moses Badger of Haverhill conducted a service which included prayers for King George III. In the tempest that followed, the town authorities closed the chapel and the parish disbanded. The Chapel was abandoned, and there is no record of an active Episcopal Society in Amesbury until after 1825.

=== St. James Parish, 1833-1903 ===
The Episcopal Church in Amesbury was organized under the name of St. James on October 8, 1833. The first services were held in Franklin Hall, located in Market Square at the site of the current Associates Building. Shortly thereafter, services were conducted in the Vestry Building of the Calvin Baptist Society on Market Street. This building was purchased in 1836 and moved to the congregation's present location at 120 Main Street. This first St. James Church building was consecrated on October 22, 1836, by the Rt. Rev. Alexander Griswold, Bishop of the Eastern Diocese.

By 1845, the parish had outgrown this building, and the first Building Fund Committee was elected to procure funds for a new, larger church. Within the year, the new church was built, and consecrated on November 5, 1846. The original St. James Chapel building was sold to the Universalist Society for $24.50; the new church building cost $5,415.79.

On March 18, 1899, a fire started in the Opera House (where the former Strand Theatre now stands), directly across the street from the church. This inferno spread to adjacent business blocks, leaped the street, and consumed both the Rand-Adams block and the church. All was left in a mass of smoldering ruins.

The small parish resolved to build a new and larger church, and under the leadership of the rector, Rev. R. LeBlanc Lynch, plans were initiated, and generous contributions from parishioners, friends, and the Diocese led to the construction of our present church. The cornerstone was laid on September 26, 1899, and the present St. James Church was consecrated by the Rt. Rev. William Lawrence, Bishop of Massachusetts, on May 7, 1903.

=== Later history ===
One century later, another devastating fire brought destruction to the neighborhood and threatened St. James: in 2001 the church sanctuary and hall were closed for a year by smoke and water damage.

In 2006 St. James parted ways with James Place, an after-school program started at St. James under Fr. Mike Shirley. The Reverend Susan Esco-Chandler became a Priest-in-Charge at St. James in 2006 through 2012. The Reverend Dee Woodward served as interim priest in 2013 and 2014. In late 2014 St. James called The Reverend John Satula as permanent rector. St. James is currently holding services every Sunday at 8am (Rite I) and 10am (Rite II with music), and offering Godly Play for children every Sunday, Sept through May during the 10am service.
