= Old Warren County Courthouse Complex =

- U.S. National Register of Historic Places
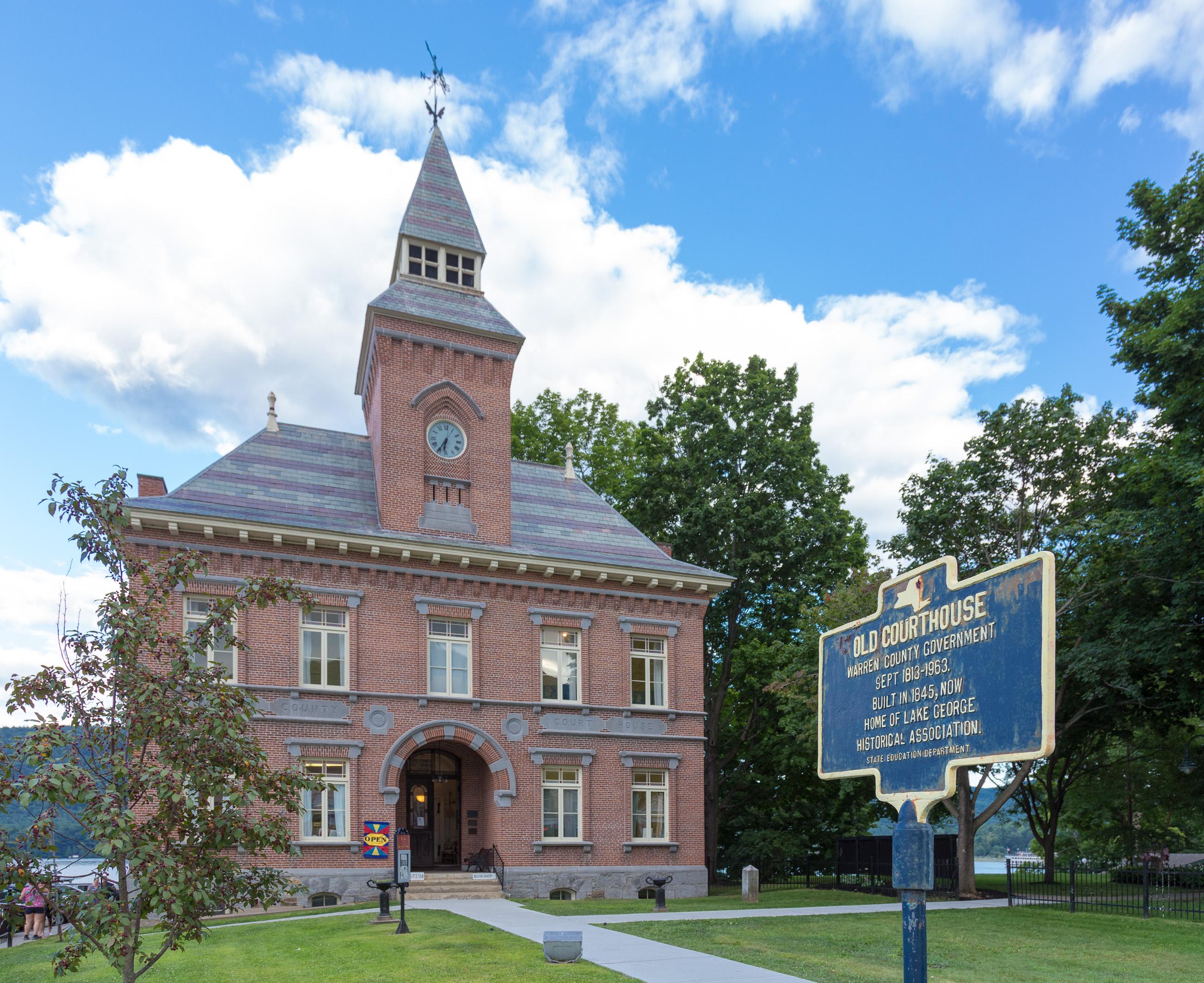
- Courthouse with plaque, 2015.

- Location within New York Location within the United States
- Location: Canada and Amherst Sts., Lake George, NY
- Coordinates: 43°25′32″N 73°42′43″W
- Area: less than one acre
- Built: 1845
- Architect: Winfield Sherwood
- NRHP reference No.: 73001282
- Added to NRHP: June 19, 1973

The Old Warren County Courthouse Complex is located at the corner of Amherst and Canada streets (US 9/NY 9N) in Lake George, New York, United States. It is a large brick building erected in five stages from the 1840s to the 1890s. Not all of the stages built are extant.

Its imposing clock tower has made it a landmark in the village. The county government moved out in the early 1960s. After a period of several years during which the building remained vacant, local preservation groups were able to get it reopened to serve a number of other public purposes. In 1973 it was listed on the National Register of Historic Places. Today it is home to the local historical society and a community arts group.

== Property ==
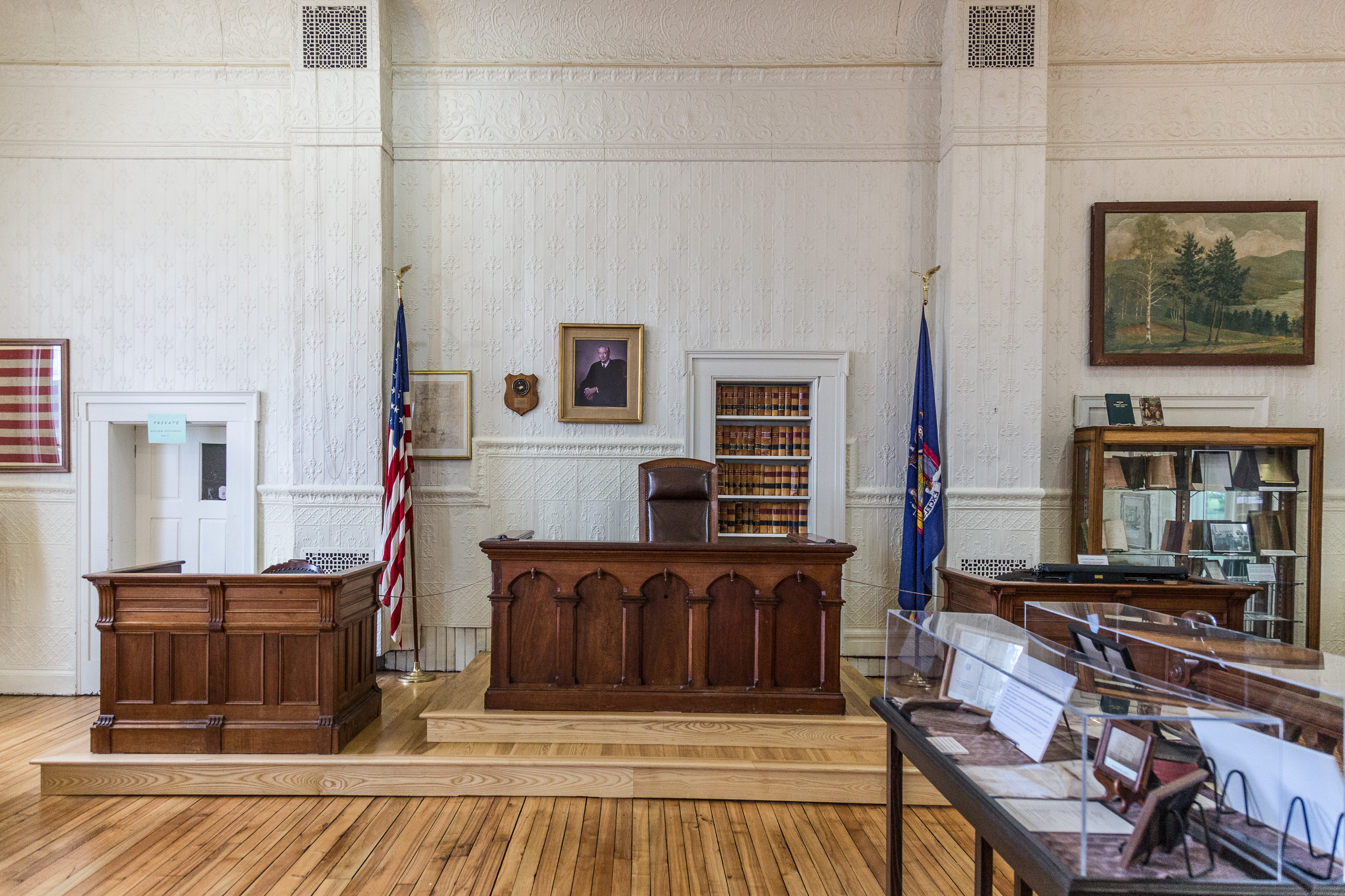
The courthouse interior features the judge's bench and some displays

The courthouse complex is located on a narrow parcel of less than 1-acre (0.40 ha) that extends from the street to the shore of Lake George itself. All sections are linked. They are built of masonry load-bearing walls faced in brick, on a limestone foundation with polychromatic slate roof pierced by six chimneys. The three remaining sections are, from west to east, the judges' chambers, original courthouse, and jail wing.

On the judges' chambers, the western (front) facade is five bays wide and two stories tall, with a two-stage clock tower rising from the center. Below it a recessed front door is framed by an arched entranceway. Between the two stories is a double belt course on which is inscribed "WARREN COUNTY" north of the entry and tower and "COURT HOUSE" south of it. A decorative brick cornice on the second story roofline is repeated on the tower's first stage. The clock tower is topped with a hipped roof and weathervane.

To its east is the original courthouse building. It is one and a half stories tall and three bays wide on either side. Pilasters divide the narrow windows, and the roof is pierced by a gabled dormer window in the center of both sides. The jail wing to its east, closest to the lakeshore, is a two-story gabled block four bays long by three wide. It has a unique structural system. The first floor is an open room without partitions or columns; the second floor's weight is supported by three steel rods suspended from trusses below the roof.

Inside, the buildings have undergone many changes since they were first built, and have lost most of their architectural distinctiveness. The courthouse retains its original windows and high ceilings, and there are some original cells left in the jail wing.

== History ==
Lake George was designated the county seat when Warren County was created in 1813. At the time the settlement had been growing rapidly because of its location on what was expected to be a main trade route to Canada. It was then known as Caldwell, after James Caldwell of Albany, a major landowner and businessman in the region, who had seen the potential for this trade route.

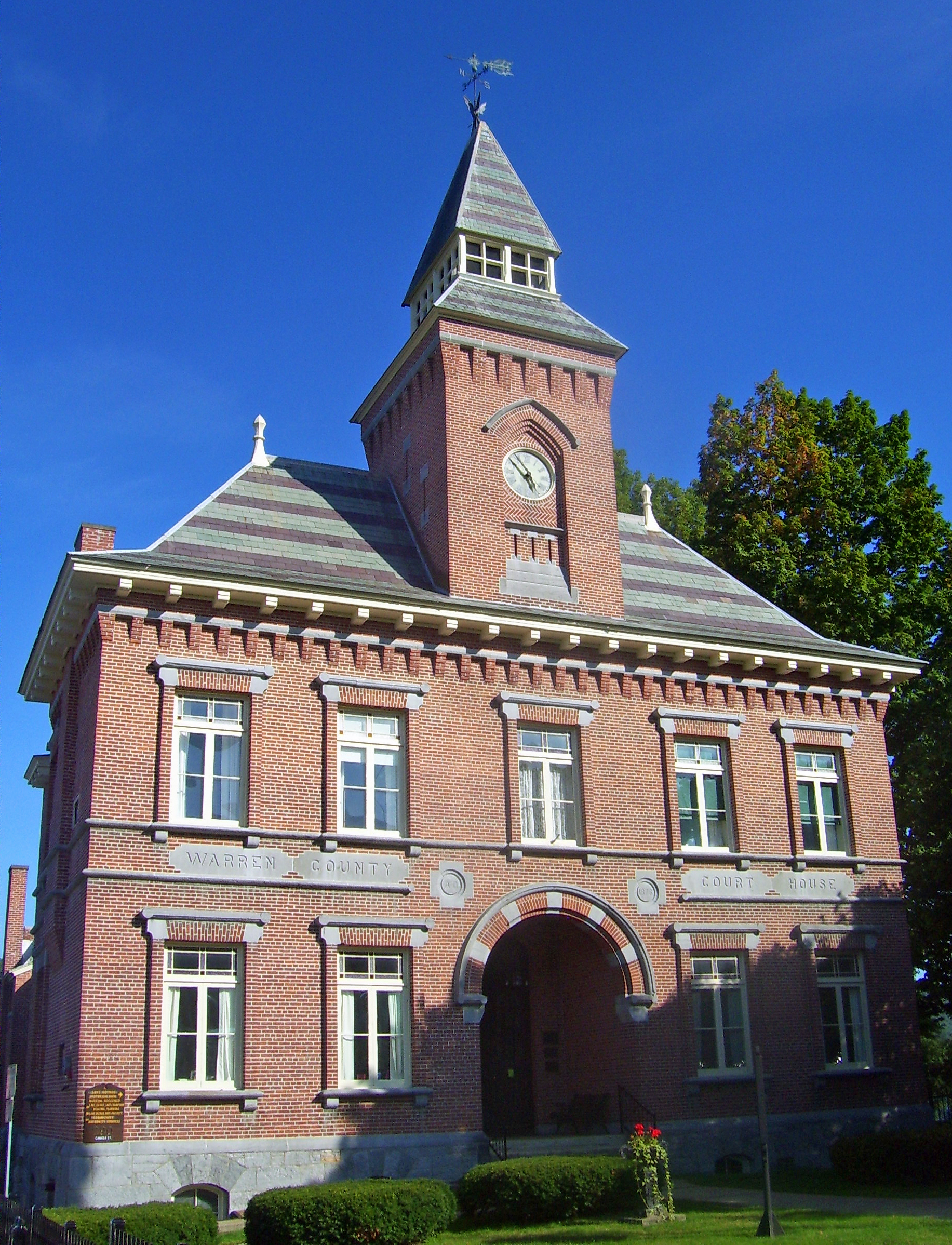
West Elevation, 2008

For the first four years of the county's existence, the court met in a local coffeehouse. In 1815, Caldwell donated land at the present site for a courthouse, and one was built, as well as a clerk's office and jail. Little is known about the architecture of those buildings. County records do indicate that the courthouse had a wooden cupola which frequently needed repairs. As a result, the county had difficulty getting it insured.

In 1843 the courthouse and the county clerk's office burned down. A Glens Falls architect, Winfield Sherwood, designed a replacement building that was completed two years later. This is the present courtroom building in the middle of the complex. During the 1860 election, Stephen A. Douglas is said to have delivered a campaign speech here in opposition to Abraham Lincoln.

Later in the century the complex grew. In 1878 the judges' quarters were added, giving the building its distinctive clock tower. Seven years later, in 1885, the small clerk's building was replaced by a larger one that was added to the front of the judge's quarters, to some criticism of its effect on the building as a whole.

The county's Board of Supervisors met either here or in the armory in Glens Falls until 1905, when a meeting room was built over the county clerk's offices. Since 1860 there had been some efforts to move the county seat to Glens Falls, which had grown much larger than Lake George because of industrialization. The county located some offices there, and some to the north in Warrensburg, but Lake George remained the county seat.

In 1959 county voters approved a bond issue for a new county government complex in Queensbury, along Route 9 several miles south of the village. It was built and opened in 1963, at which time the old courthouse was finally abandoned. It was vacant for several years, and considered for demolition until the newly formed Lake George Historical Association was able to persuade the Town of Lake George, which owned it by then, to reopen it for use as the association's offices and museum. Shortly afterwards, in 1969, the 1885 front addition was torn down to restore the original view of the front of the building. In 1977, the Lake George Arts Center joined the historical society, opening a gallery in the former courtroom in addition to using the building as its headquarters as well.

== See also ==
- National Register of Historic Places listings in Warren County, New York
