= Ticonderoga II =

History

United States
- Name: LCI(L)-1085 (1944–1947)
- Builder: Defoe Shipbuilding Company; Bay City, Michigan
- Commissioned: 26 August 1944
- Decommissioned: 1947
- Stricken: 1947

History

United States
- Name: Ticonderoga (II) (1950–1993)
- Owner: Lake George Steamboat Company (1949–1993)
- Fate: Scrapped at Lake George in 1993.

General characteristics
- Class & type: LCI(L)-351-class large landing craft
- Displacement: 246 t.(light), 264 t.(landing), 419 t.(loaded)
- Length: 158 ft 5.5 in (48.298 m)
- Beam: 23 ft 3 in (7.09 m)
- Draft: Light, 3 ft 1.5 in (0.953 m) mean; Landing, 2 ft 8 in (0.81 m) fwd, 4 ft 10 in (1.47 m) aft; Loaded, 5 ft 4 in (1.63 m) fwd, 5 ft 11 in (1.80 m) aft
- Propulsion: 2 sets of 4 General Motors diesels, 4 per shaft, BHP 1,600, twin variable pitch propellers
- Speed: 16 knots (30 km/h) (max.); 14 knots (26 km/h) maximum continuous
- Endurance: 4,000 miles at 12 knots, loaded, 500 miles at 15 knots; and 110 tons of fuel
- Capacity: 75 tons cargo
- Troops: 6 Officers, 182 Enlisted
- Complement: 4 officers, 24 enlisted
- Armament: 5 × 20 mm AA guns; 2 × .50" machine guns
- Armor: 2" plastic splinter protection on gun turrets, conning tower, and pilot house

Ticonderoga II was a passenger vessel owned by the Lake George Steamboat Company to operate on Lake George. It was refitted for passenger use from a decommissioned U.S. Navy vessel. Formerly USS LCI(L)-1085, she was an LCI(L)-351-class large landing craft built for the Navy during World War II. Like most ships of her class, she was not named by the Navy and known only by her designation until her refit. In the 1990s, she was replaced by the Lac Du Saint Sacrement.
