= Mohican II =

- MOHICAN II (steamboat)
- U.S. National Register of Historic Places
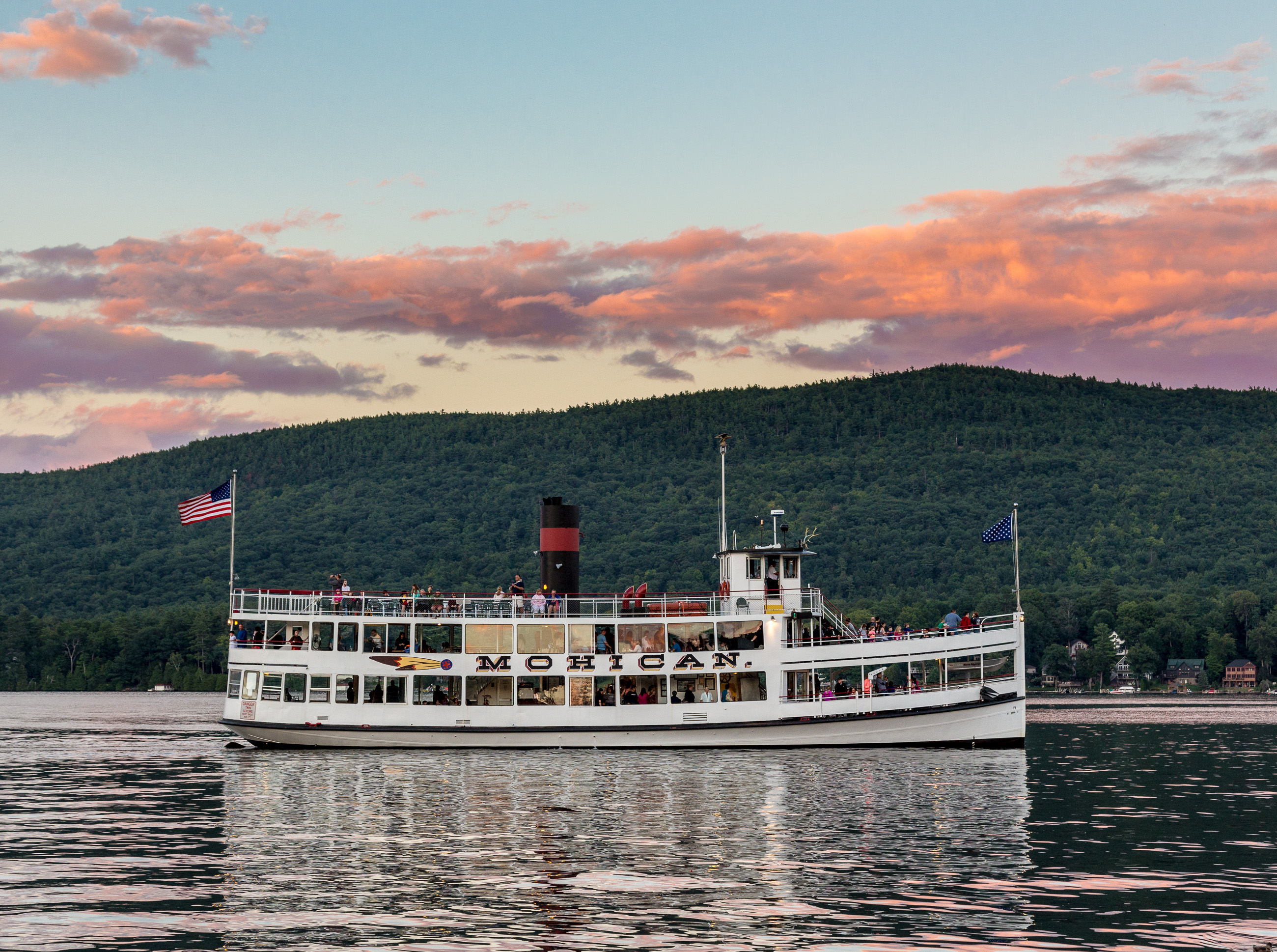

- Location within New York Location within the United States
- Location: Steel Pier, Lake George, New York
- Coordinates: 43°25′15″N 73°42′34″W
- Area: 0.9 acres (0.36 ha)
- Built: 1907
- Architect: J.W. Millard
- Architectural style: steamboat
- NRHP reference No.: 10000554
- Added to NRHP: August 19, 2010

Mohican II is a historic steel riveted hull excursion steamboat located at Lake George in Warren County, New York. She was built in 1907-08 for the Lake George Steamboat Company by the T.S. Marvel Shipuilding Company of Newburgh, New York. She measures 117 ft (36 m) in length, 26 ft (7.9 m) in beam, and 8.3 ft (2.5 m) depth of hold. She was designed for use on Lake George as an excursion vessel, has been in continuous use for over 100 years and is the oldest passenger vessel in the United States.

It was listed on the National Register of Historic Places in 2010.
