= Lake George (village), New York =

Lake George
- Village
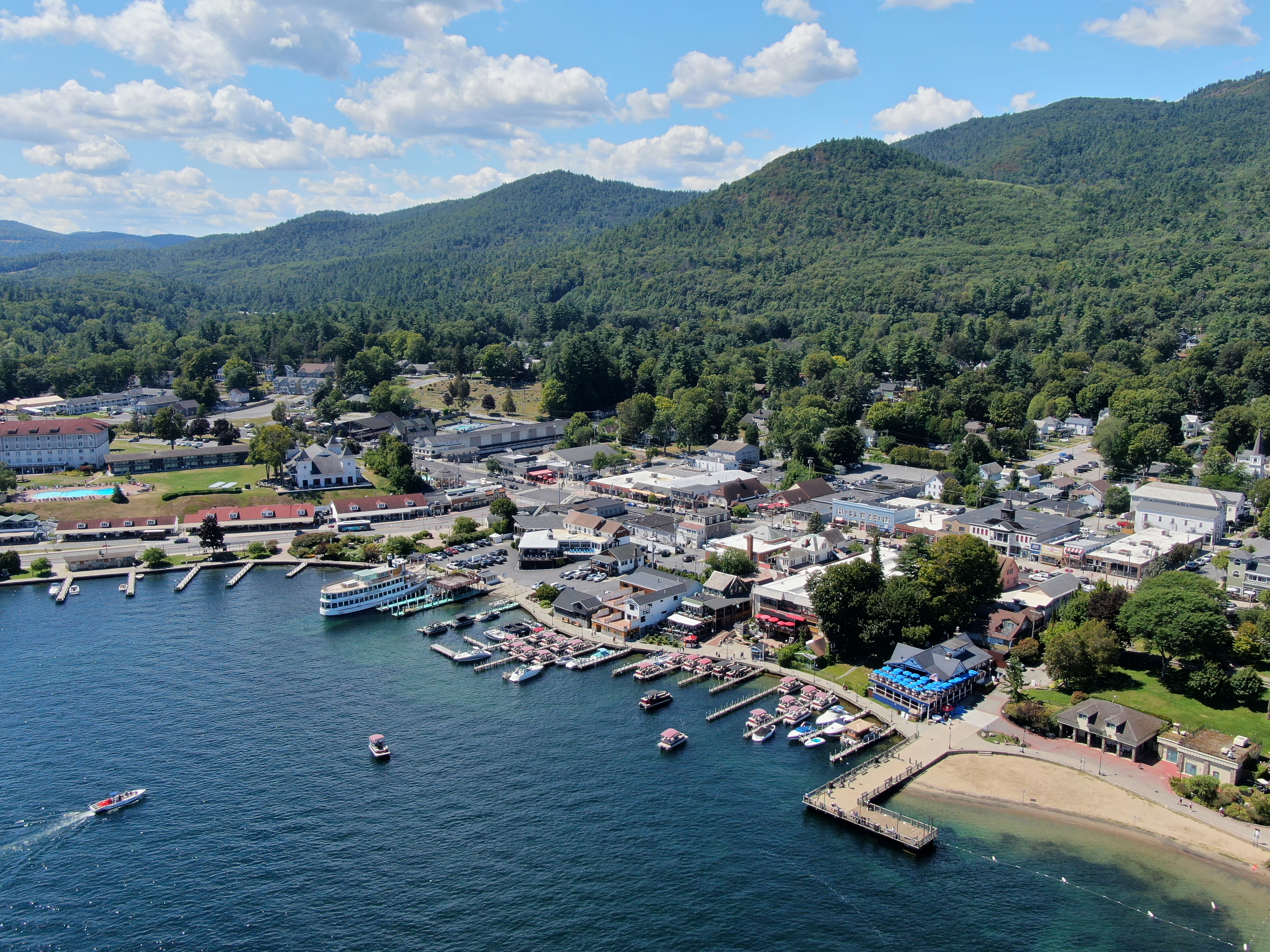
- Aerial view of downtown Lake George

- Seal
- Etymology: from nearby body of water
- Location of New York in the United States

- Location within New York Location within the United States
- Coordinates: 43°25′33″N 73°42′43″W
- Country: United States
- State: New York
- County: Warren
- Founded: 1903

Government
  - Type: Village Hall
  - Mayor: Ray Perry

Area
  - Total: 0.59 sq mi (1.52 km^{2})
  - Land: 0.59 sq mi (1.52 km^{2})
  - Water: 0 sq mi (0.00 km^{2})
- Elevation: 360 ft (110 m)
- Highest elevation: 480 ft (150 m)
- Lowest elevation (Lake shore): 353 ft (108 m)

Population (2020)
  - Total: 1,008
  - Density: 1,720/sq mi (664.1/km^{2})
- Time zone: UTC-5 (Eastern (EST))
  - Summer (DST): UTC-4 (EDT)
- ZIP Code: 12845
- Area code: 518
- FIPS code: 36-40508
- GNIS feature ID: 0954913
- Website: Village of Lake George

The Village of Lake George is a village within the town of Lake George in Warren County, New York, United States, located at the southern end of its namesake lake. The population was 906 at the 2010 census. It is part of the Glens Falls Metropolitan Statistical Area. The village and the surrounding area is a famous summertime tourist region and historic summer colony, which at one time included Alfred Stieglitz and Georgia O'Keeffe.

Lake George was the county seat of Warren County until 1963, when the county seat was moved to Queensbury.

== History ==
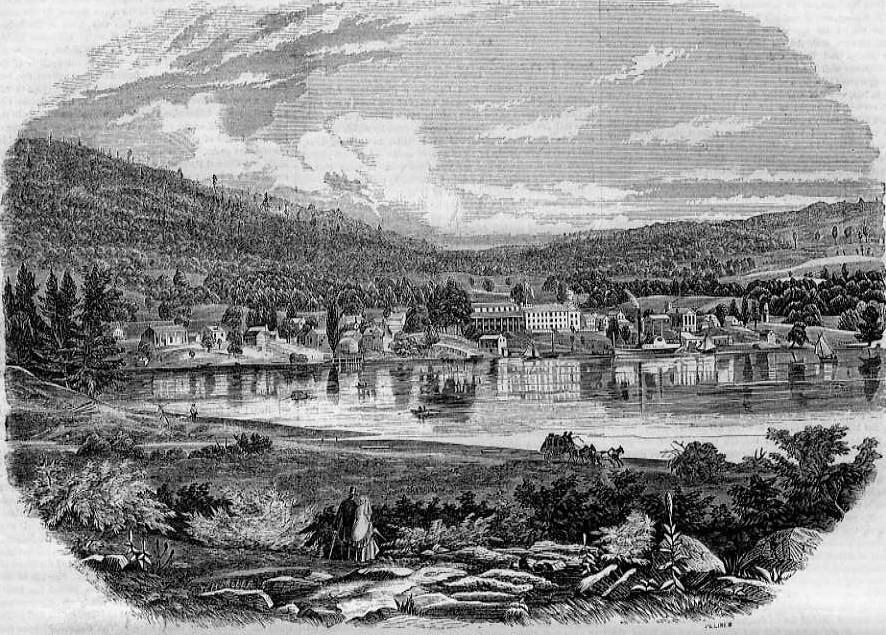
Village of Lake George, 1854

The village of Lake George was originally known as Caldwell, a name preserved in the Caldwell Presbyterian Church. Located on the southern end of Lake George within the eastern edge of the Adirondack Park, the village and surrounding area were on the route between the British and French colonies, and were often traversed by military forces during the Colonial wars. A reconstruction of Fort William Henry, which replaced the original burned during the French and Indian War, is within the village and serves as a living museum.

In the last quarter of the 19th century the area began to become an important tourist destination. Railroad tracks ran onto the steamboat docks on the south end of Lake George. From there steamboats ran several times a day to the hotels further north on the lake. The Lake George Steamboat Company continues to operate steamboats out of Lake George.

The Village of Lake George was incorporated in 1903. Besides the fort with its many associations, historic points of interest include the defunct railway station and a 19th-century courthouse and jail, now operated as a museum by the local historical society. The beach at one motel in the village features a plaque marking the site where the Marquis de Montcalm landed with his army preparatory to attacking the fort. A plaque at the site of the Bloody Pond Massacre is a short distance south of the village along US 9.

The town was somewhat notable for having the same mayor for more than half a century. Robert M. Blais was sworn into office as the mayor of Lake George Village, New York, and would celebrate half a century in office in 2021. As of 2022, he had still been in office after 51 consecutive years.

== Geography ==
According to the United States Census Bureau, the village has a total area of 0.6 square miles (1.6 km^{2}), all land. It is situated beside Lake George. The village is located approximately 50 miles (80 km) north of Albany and about 200 miles (320 km) north of New York City and northwest of Boston.

== Demographics ==
Historical population
Census	Pop.	Note	%±
1910	632		—
1920	630		−0.3%
1930	848		34.6%
1940	803		−5.3%
1950	1,005		25.2%
1960	1,026		2.1%
1970	1,046		1.9%
1980	1,047		0.1%
1990	933		−10.9%
2000	985		5.6%
2010	906		−8.0%
2020	1,008		11.3%
U.S. Decennial Census

As of the census of 2000, there were 985 people, 448 households, and 237 families residing in the village. The population density was 1,615.3 people per square mile (623.7 people/km^{2}). There were 579 housing units at an average density of 949.5 per square mile (366.6/km^{2}). The racial makeup of the village was 97.36% White, 1.02% Black or African American, 0.10% Native American, 0.61% Asian, 0.30% from other races, and 0.61% from two or more races. Hispanic or Latino of any race were 0.71% of the population.

There were 448 households, out of which 26.6% had children under the age of 18 living with them, 37.5% were married couples living together, 10.9% had a female householder with no husband present, and 46.9% were non-families. 36.6% of all households were made up of individuals, and 10.7% had someone living alone who was 65 years of age or older. The average household size was 2.19 and the average family size was 2.90.

In the village, the population was spread out, with 22.5% under the age of 18, 8.5% from 18 to 24, 28.4% from 25 to 44, 26.6% from 45 to 64, and 13.9% who were 65 years of age or older. The median age was 40 years. For every 100 females, there were 98.2 males. For every 100 females age 18 and over, there were 98.2 males.

The median income for a household in the village was $33,000, and the median income for a family was $45,625. Males had a median income of $29,318 versus $24,792 for females. The per capita income for the village was $20,077. About 7.7% of families and 11.1% of the population were below the poverty line, including 13.2% of those under the age of 18 and 15.2% of those 65 and older.

== Arts and culture ==
The Delaware and Hudson Passenger Station, Lake George Battlefield Park Historic District, Mohican II, Old Warren County Courthouse Complex, St. James Episcopal Church, and United States Post Office are listed on the National Register of Historic Places.

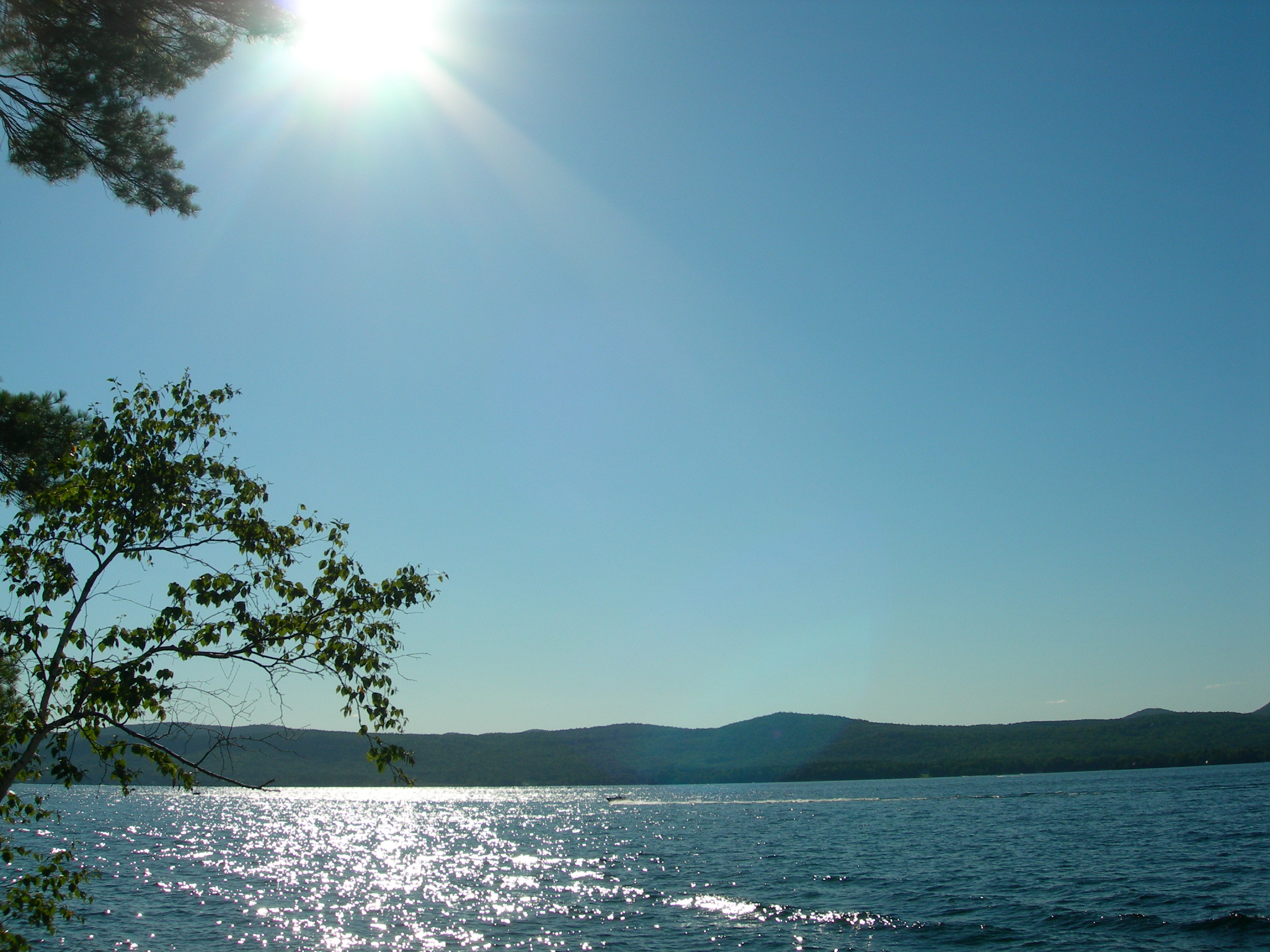
Lake George

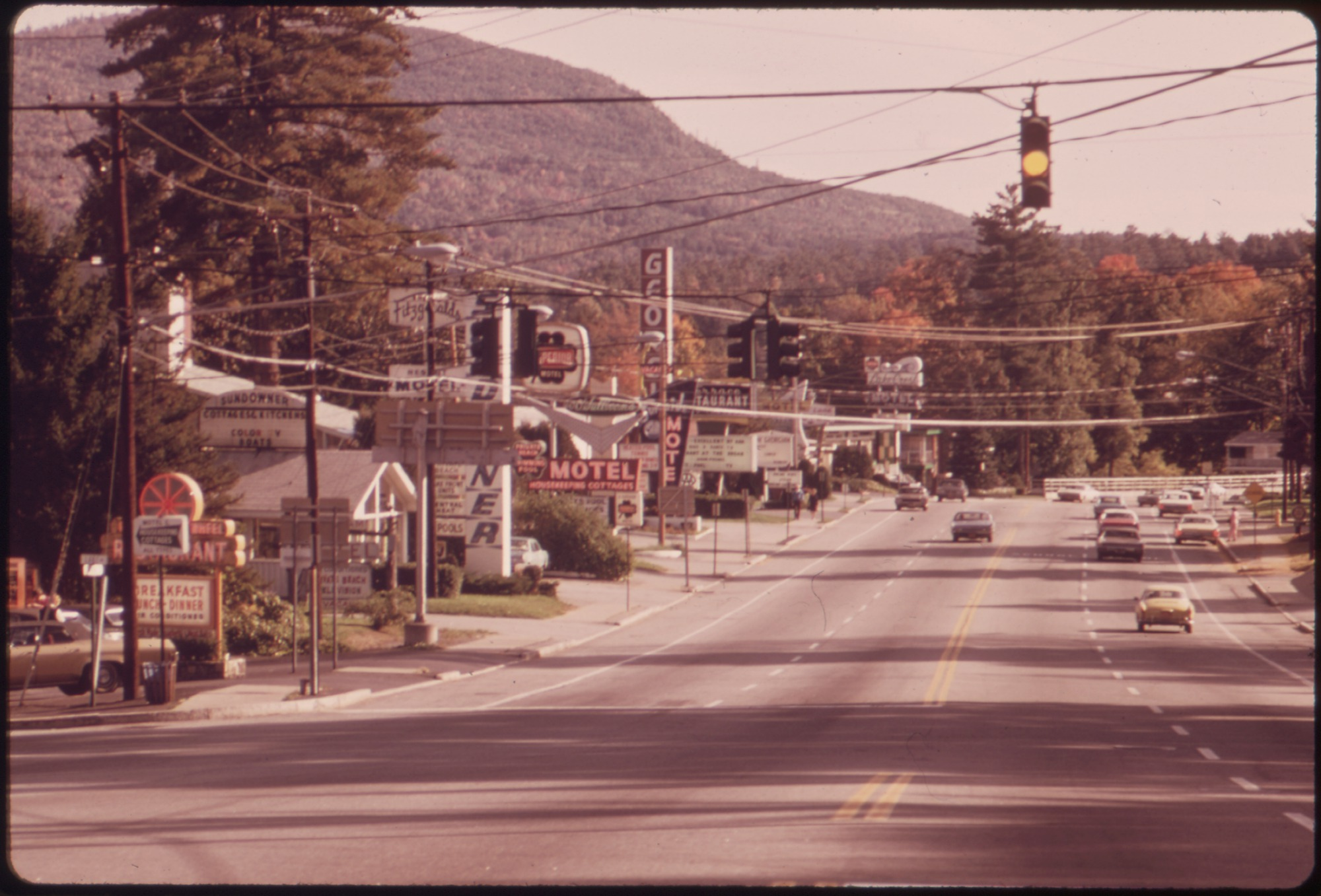
Entrance to Lake George Village, 1973

Fort William Henry
