= St. James' Church =

St James Church, St. James' Church or St. James Chapel or St. James Parish Church may refer to:

== Australia ==
- St. James's Church, a historic church in Morpeth, New South Wales
- St James' Church, Sydney, New South Wales
- St James' Church, Malanda, Queensland
- St James Anglican Church, Toowoomba, a church in Queensland
  - St James Parish Hall, Toowoomba, a parish hall
- St James' Church, Brighton, Victoria
- St James' Church, Greenough, Western Australia

== Barbados ==
- St. James Church, Barbados

== Bosnia and Herzegovina ==
- St. James Church, Medjugorje

== Belgium ==
- St. James' Church, Antwerp
- St. James's Church, Bruges

== Canada ==
- St. James Anglican Church (Vancouver), British Columbia
- Saint James United Church (Montreal), Quebec

== China ==
- St. Jacobi Church, Wuhu, Anhui

== Czech Republic ==
- Church of St. James (Brno)
- Church of St. James the Greater (Prague)

== Denmark ==
- St. James' Church, Copenhagen

== Germany ==
The German name for St. James is Jacobus or Jakobus, meaning two apostles.

- St. Jakobus, Görlitz
- St. James' Church, Hamburg
- St. Jakobi, Kirchrode
- St. Jakob, Köthen
- St. Jacobi, Münster
- St. Jakob, Nuremberg
- St. James's Church, Rothenburg ob der Tauber
- St. Jakobus, Rüdesheim
- St. Jacobi, Werther

== Italy ==
- St. James`s Church, Tramin, South Tyrol

== India ==
- St. James' Church, Kolkata
- St. James' Church, Delhi
- St. James' Church, Karnal

== Ireland ==
- St James' Church, Dublin (Church of Ireland)
- St James' Church, Dublin (Roman Catholic)

== Israel ==
- Church of St. James Intercisus, a church dedicated to James Intercisus

== Jamaica ==
- St James Parish Church, Jamaica

== Malta ==
- Church of St James, Valletta
- Church of St James, Victoria
- St James's Church, Żurrieq

== New Zealand ==
- St James Church, Franz Josef
- St. James Church, Kerikeri, a historic church

== Norway ==
- St. James's Church, Bergen, a church in the city of Bergen

== Pakistan ==
- St. James Church, Lahore, a church in Pakistan

== Poland ==
- Basilica of St. James and St. Agnes, Nysa
- Co-Cathedral Basilica of St. James, Olsztyn
- Dominican Church and Convent of St. James, Sandomierz
- St. James the Apostle Archcathedral Basilica, Szczein

== Singapore ==
- St. James' Church, an Anglican church on Leedon Road off Holland Road, Singapore

== Slovakia ==
- Basilica of St. James, Levoča

== Slovenia ==
- St. James's Church, Koper
- St. James's church, Ljubljana

== South Africa ==
- St. James Church, Cape Town
- Saint James Church, Kenilworth, Cape Town

== Spain ==
- St. James Church, Montclar

== Sri Lanka ==
- St. James' Church, Nallur
- St James' Church, Vidathaltheevu

== Sweden ==
- Saint James's Church, Stockholm

== United Kingdom ==
=== England ===
- St James' Church, Arnside, Cumbria
- St James' Church, Altham, Lancashire
- St James' Church, Aslackby, Lincolnshire
- St James' Church, Audlem, Cheshire
- St. James' Church, Barrow-in-Furness, Cumbria
- St James' Church, Bartonsham, Herefordshire
- St James' Church, Buxworth, Derbyshire
- St James' Church, Birkdale, Merseyside
- St James' Church, Birkenhead, Merseyside
- St James' Church, Briercliffe, Lancashire
- St James' Church, Brindle, Lancashire
- St James' Church, Bristol
- St James' Church, Broughton, Salford, Greater Manchester
- St James' Church, Brownhills, West Midlands
- St James' Church, Burton-in-Kendal, Cumbria
- St James' Church, Cardington, Shropshire
- St James' Church, Charfield, Gloucestershire
- St James' Church, Christleton, Cheshire
- St James' Church, Church Kirk, Lancashire
- St James' Church, Clapham, North Yorkshire
- St. James' Church, Clitheroe, Lancashire
- St James' Church, Cooling, Kent
- St James' Church, Daisy Hill, Greater Manchester
- St James' Church, Dover, Kent (a ruin)
- St James' Church, Eve Hill, Dudley, West Midlands
- St. James' Church, East Cowes, Isle of Wight
- St James' Church, Emsworth, Hampshire
- St James' Church, Enfield Highway, Greater London
- St James Garlickhythe, City of London
- St James' Church, Gawsworth, Cheshire
- St James' Church, Great Ormside, Cumbria
- Grimsby Minster, North East Lincolnshire
- St James' Church, Hampton Hill, Greater London
- St James' Church, Handsworth, West Midlands
- Church of St James the Great, Haydock, Merseyside
- St James' Church, High Melton, South Yorkshire
- St James' Church, Ince, Cheshire
- St James' Church, Islington, London
- St. James' Church, Kingston, Isle of Wight
- Church of St James, Kingswood, South Gloucestershire
- St James the Less Church, Lancing, West Sussex
- St James' Chapel, Lindsey, Suffolk
- Church of St James, Liverpool
- St James' Church, Longton, Staffordshire
- St. James's Church, Piccadilly, London
- St James's Church, Pokesdown, Dorset
- St James's, Spanish Place, London
- St James' Church, Muswell Hill, London
- St James' Church, Norlands, London
- St James' Church, Longborough, Gloucestershire
- St James' Church, Mangotsfield, Gloucestershire
- St James' Church, Melsonby, North Yorkshire
- St James' Church, New Brighton, Merseyside
- St. James, Normanton, Nottinghamshire
- St James' Church, Oldham, Greater Manchester
- St.James' Church, Poole, Dorset
- St James' Church, Poolstock, Greater Manchester
- St James Church, Quedgeley, Gloucester
- St James's Church, Reading
- St. James' Church, Ryde, Isle of Wight
- St. James' Church, Seacroft, Leeds, West Yorkshire
- St. James' Church, Standard Hill, Nottingham
- St James' Church, Stanstead Abbotts, Hertfordshire
- St James with Holy Trinity Church, Scarborough, North Yorkshire
- St James' Church, Stirchley, Shropshire
- Church of St James the Less, Sulgrave, Northamptonshire
- St James' Church, Taunton, Somerset
- St James' Church, West Derby, Liverpool
- St James' Church, Whitehaven, Cumbria
- St James' Church, Wigmore, Herefordshire
- St James' Church, Wrightington Bar, Lancashire
- St. James' Church, Yarmouth, Isle of Wight
- St James Church, West Tilbury, Essex
- St James' Parish Church, Wetherby, West Yorkshire

=== Scotland ===
- St James Church, St Andrews

=== Wales ===
- St James's Church, Manorbier, Pembrokeshire
- Our Lady and St James Church, Bangor, Gwynedd

=== Overseas ===
- Saint James' Church, Jamestown, Saint Helena

== United States ==
- St. James' Episcopal Church (Los Angeles, California)
- St. James' Episcopal Church (South Pasadena, California)
- St. James Episcopal Church, Mill Creek (Stanton, Delaware)
- St. James Episcopal Church (Oskaloosa, Iowa)
- St. James Church (Louisville, Kentucky)
- St. James' Parish (Lothian, Maryland) or St. James Church
- St. James Church (Monkton, Maryland)
- St. James Chapel (St. James, Missouri)
- St. James Church and Rectory (Callicoon, New York)
- St. James' Church (Cleveland, New York)
- St. James Chapel (Hyde Park, New York)
- St. James Episcopal Church (Hyde Park, New York)
- St. James the Major Catholic Church (Lake Pleasant, New York)
- St. James' Episcopal Church (New York City)
- St. James Roman Catholic Church (Manhattan)
- St. James Church (Queens, New York)
- St. James Chapel (Stony Brook, New York)
- St. James Church (Goose Creek, South Carolina)
- St. James Church (Santee, South Carolina)
- St. James Church (Memphis, Tennessee)
- St James Episcopal Church (Austin, Texas)
- St. James Episcopal Church (Midvale, Utah)
- St. James Evangelical Lutheran Church, Milwaukee, Wisconsin
- St. James Church (Accomac, Virginia)
- St. James Church (Charlottesville, Virginia)

== See also ==
- Cathedral of St. James (disambiguation)
- Church of St James and St Paul, Marton, Cheshire
- Church of St Philip and St James, Bentley, a church in Bentley, South Yorkshire
- St. Jakobus, Rüdesheim, a church in Germany
- St. James-Bond Church, Toronto, Ontario
- St. James Anglican Church (disambiguation)
- St. James Catholic Church (disambiguation)
- St. James Episcopal Church (disambiguation)
- St. James Lutheran Church (disambiguation)
- St James the Great (disambiguation)#Churches
- St James the Less and St Helen Church, Colchester
- St James Garlickhythe, London
- St Jax Montréal, Quebec
- St Margaret and St James' Church, Long Marton, Cumbria
- St Philip and St James Church (disambiguation)
