= Cathedral Basilica of St. James =

Cathedral Basilica of St. James may refer to:

- Cathedral Basilica of St. James (Brooklyn), New York, United States
- Cathedral Basilica of St. James the Apostle, Tunja, Colombia
- Cathedral Basilica of St. James the Apostle, Szczecin, Poland

== See also ==
- Cathedral of St. James (disambiguation)
