= Cathedral of St. James =

Cathedral of St. James or St. James Cathedral may refer to:

== Austria ==
- Innsbruck Cathedral (Dom zu St. Jakob)

== Australia ==
- St James' Cathedral, Townsville, Queensland
- St James Old Cathedral, Melbourne, Victoria

== Canada ==
- Cathedral Church of St. James (Toronto)
- Saint-Jacques Cathedral (Montreal), mostly demolished
- Mary, Queen of the World Cathedral in Montreal, originally known as Saint James Cathedral
- St. James' Cathedral (Peace River), Alberta

== Chile ==
- St. James Cathedral, Valparaíso

== Croatia ==
- Šibenik Cathedral of St James

== Israel ==
- Cathedral of St. James, Jerusalem

== Latvia ==
- St. James's Cathedral, Riga

== Panama ==
- St. James the Apostle Cathedral, Santiago de Veraguas

== Philippines ==
- Cathedral of Saint James the Elder (Bangued)

== Poland ==
- Cathedral Basilica of St. James the Apostle, Szczecin

== Portugal ==
- Cathedral of St. James the Great, Beja

== Puerto Rico ==
- Catedral Santiago Apostol (Fajardo, Puerto Rico), listed on the NRHP in Puerto Rico

== Spain ==
- St. James' Cathedral, Bilbao
- Santiago de Compostela Cathedral

== United States ==
- St. James Cathedral (Chicago)
- Cathedral Basilica of St. James (Brooklyn)
- St. James Cathedral (Orlando, Florida)
- Cathedral of St. James (South Bend, Indiana), listed on the National Register of Historic Places
- St. James Cathedral (Seattle)
- Proto-Cathedral of St. James the Greater (Vancouver, Washington, United States), known as St. James Cathedral from 1851 to 1907

== See also ==
- St. James' Church (disambiguation)
