= Alberto Cruz Montt =

Chilean architect, university teacher

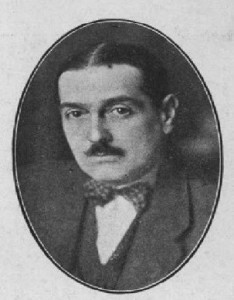
- Born: 1879; Valparaíso
- Died: August 1955 (aged 75–76); Santiago

Alberto Cruz Montt (1879 – 1955), was a Chilean architect and professor who was an exponent of the Neoclassical style.

== Early life ==
Alberto Cruz Montt was son of Ramón Cruz Moreno and Eloísa Montt Montt. He was educated at the École Spéciale d'Architecture in Paris.

== Marriage ==
He married Beatriz Larraín Bravo, the sister of the also architect Ricardo Larraín Bravo, who was his partner in various architectural works, like the Palacio Íñiguez, currently housing the Confitería Torres.

He was professor of History of Architecture at the Universidad de Chile and at the Pontificia Universidad Católica de Chile, between 1952 and 1955.

== Works ==
- 1904: Palacio Astoreca, in Iquique (also attributed to Miguel Retornano).
- 1906: Remodeling of the Castillo Wulff, in Viña del Mar.
- 1906: Palacio Irarrázabal.
- 1907: Castillo de las Majadas de Pirque.
- 1908: Iñiguez palace.
- 1910: Palacio Astoreca.
- 1912: Castillo Ross, in Viña del Mar.
- 1917: Palacio Ariztía.
- 1918: Palacio Eguiguren.
- 1918: Palacio Versailles, former headquarters for the Sociedad Nacional de Agricultura, hoy Museo de Arte Contemporáneo de Santiago (Santiago de Chile).
- 1918: Iglesia de Nuestra Señora de las Mercedes (Papudo).
- 1917-1925: Edificio del Club de la Unión.
- 1928: Edificio Ariztía, the first skyscraper of Santiago.
- 1925: Edificio sede del Colegio de Enfermeras de Chile.
- 1928: Edificio sede del Banco Central de Chile.
- St. James Cathedral, Valparaíso.
- Edificio del ex Congreso Nacional de Chile (repairs after the 1906 Valparaíso earthquake).
- Edificio de la Sociedad Chilena de Historia y Geografía.
- Facultad de Artes de la Universidad de Chile.

== Gallery ==
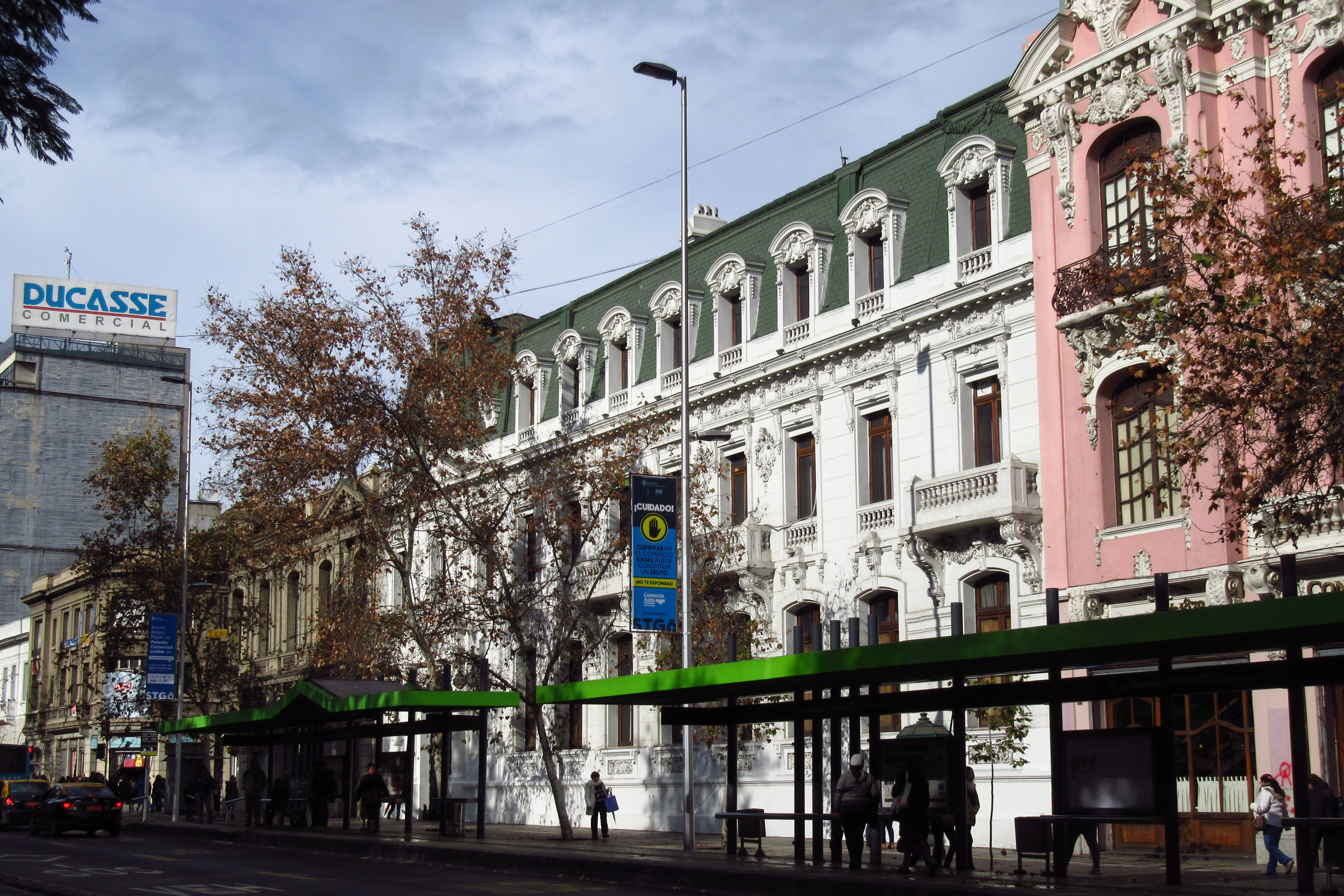
Palacio Irarrázabal (Santiago, 1906)

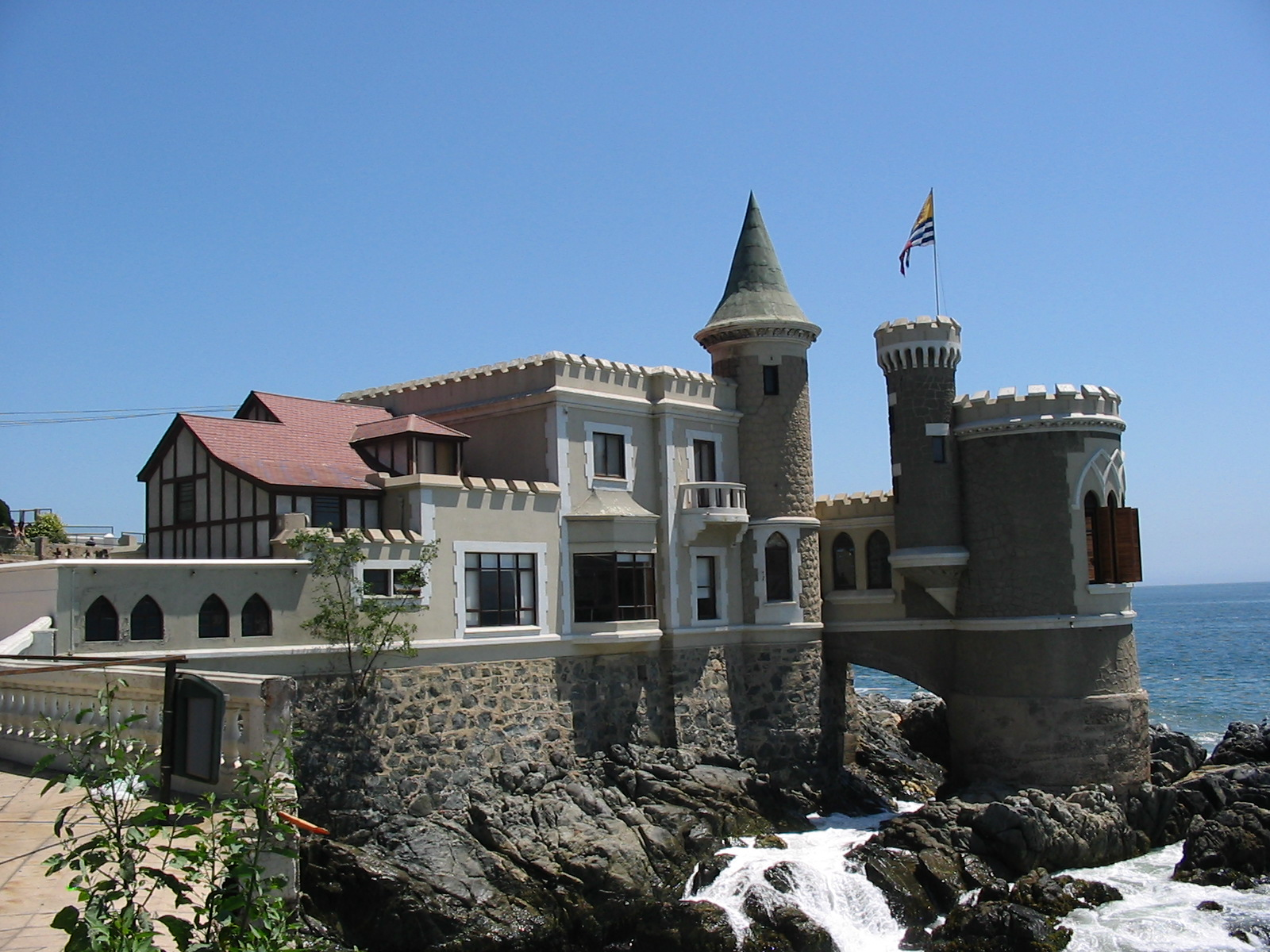
Castillo Wulff (Viña del Mar, 1906)

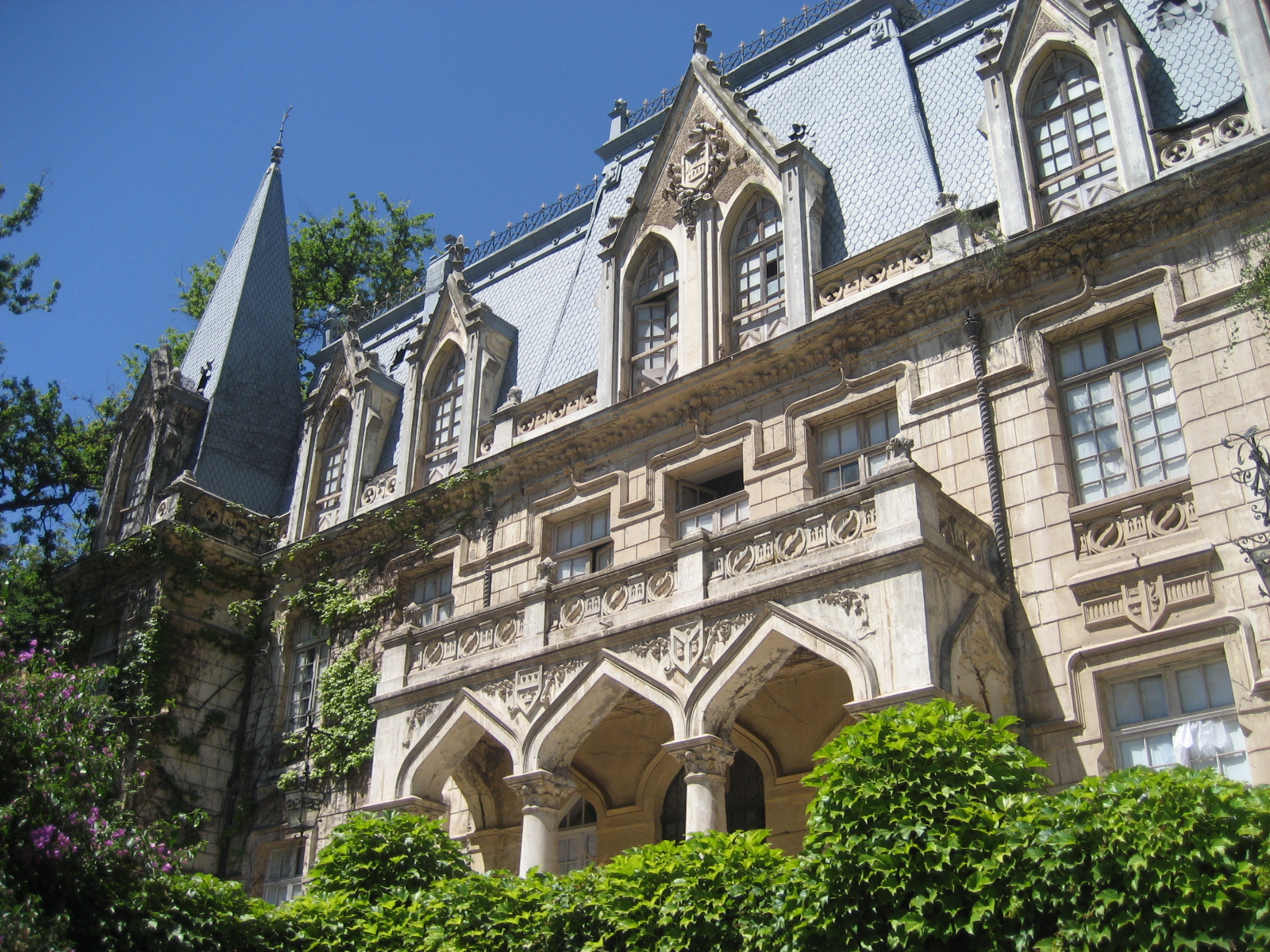
Castillo de las Majadas de Pirque (1907)

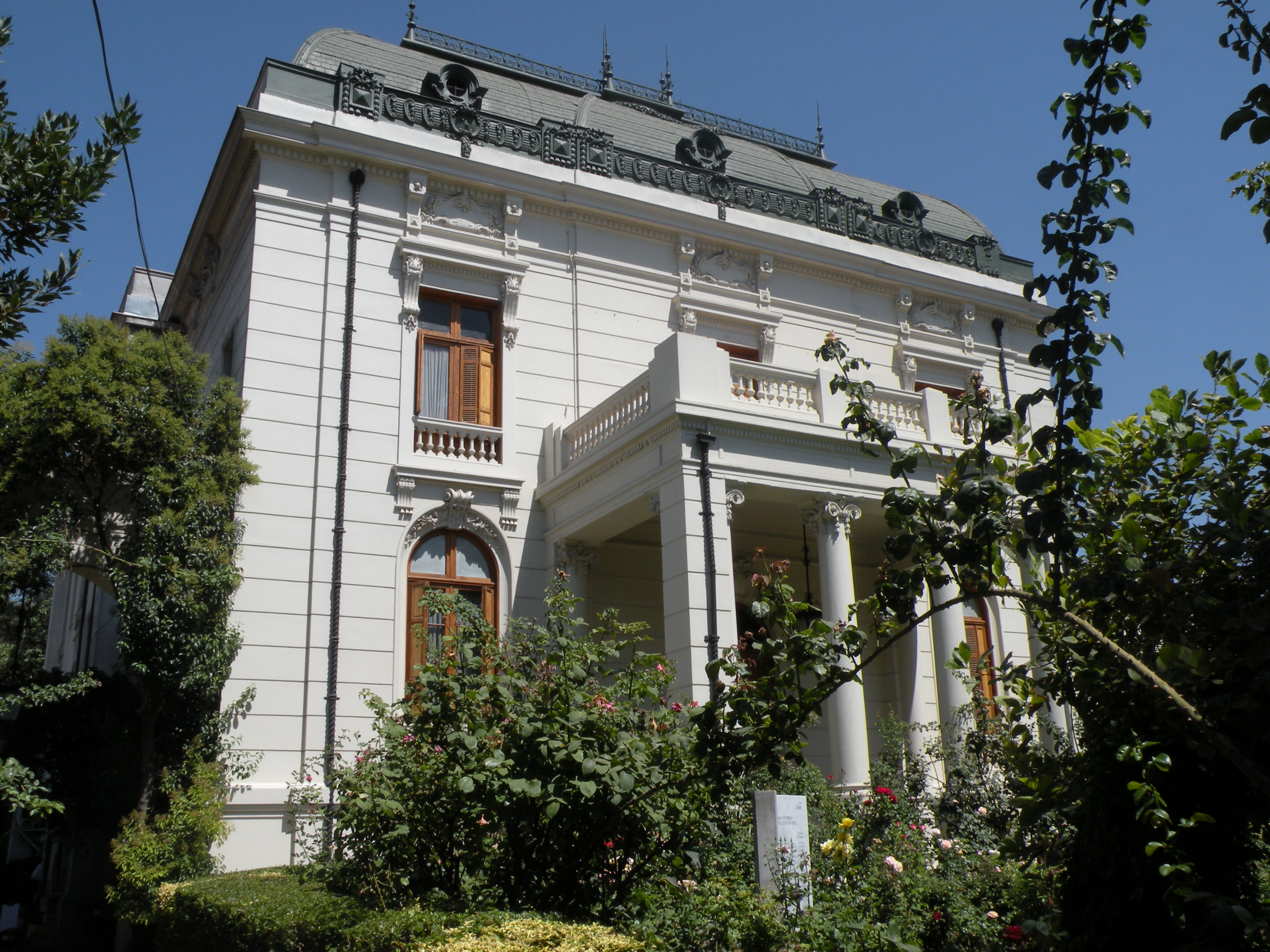
Palacio Astoreca (Santiago, 1910)

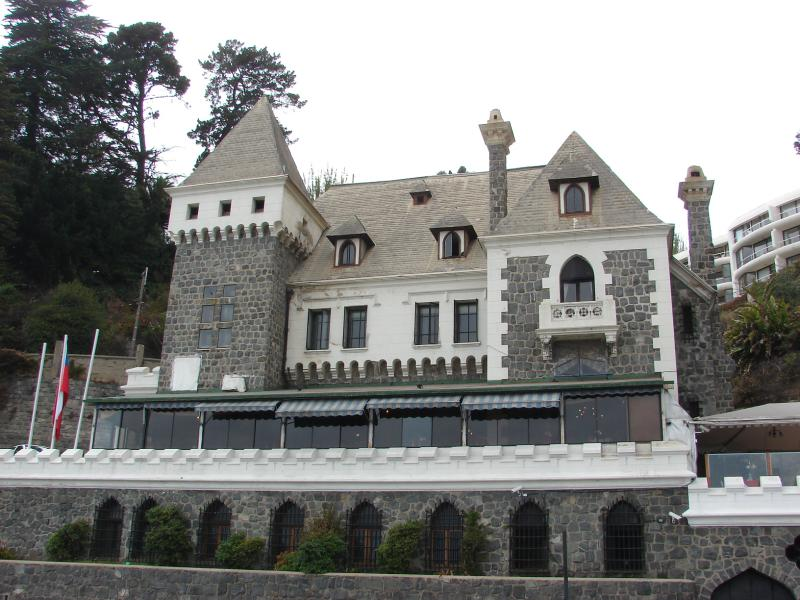
Castillo Ross (Viña del Mar, 1910–1912)

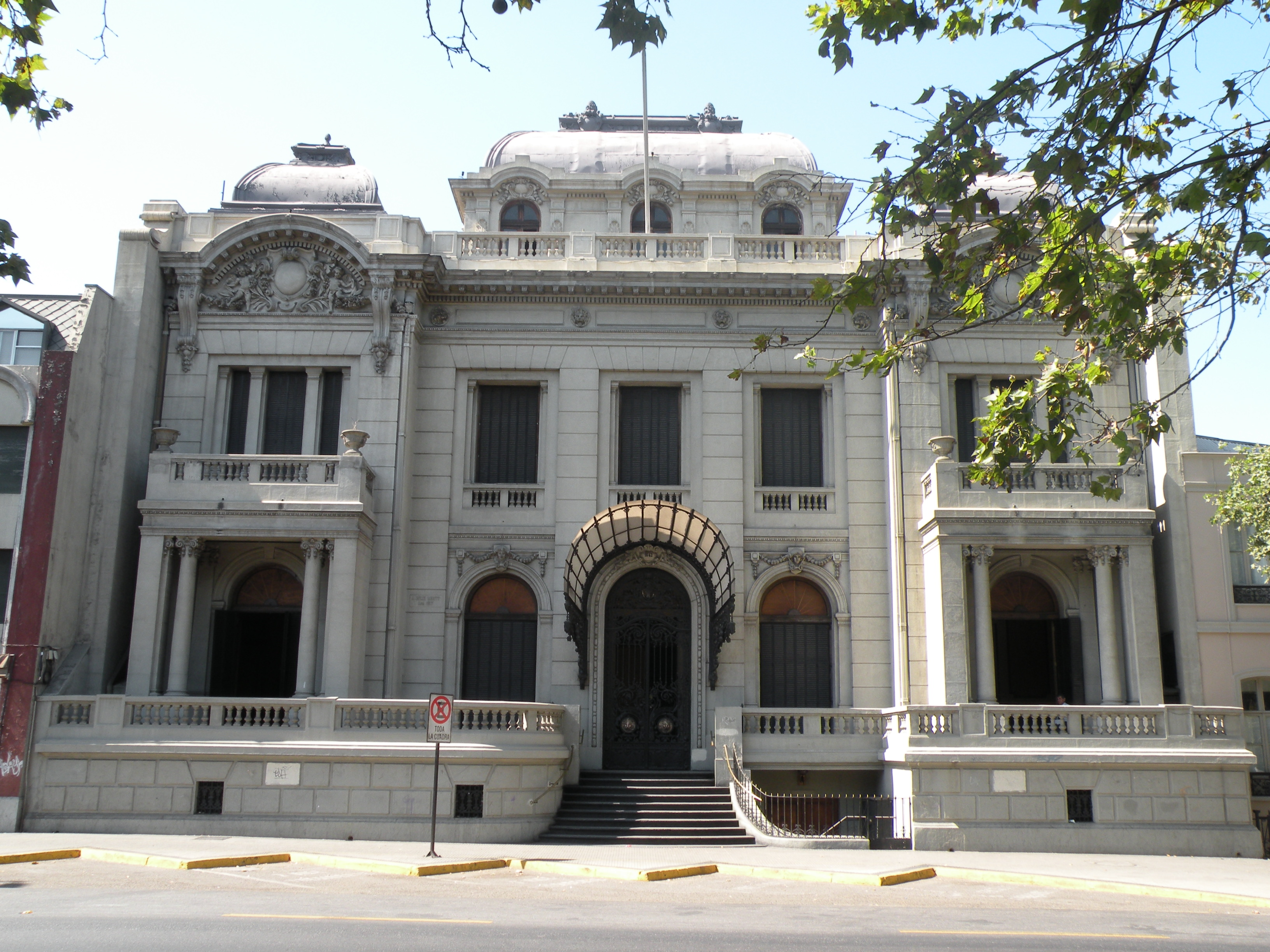
Palacio Ariztía (Santiago, 1917)

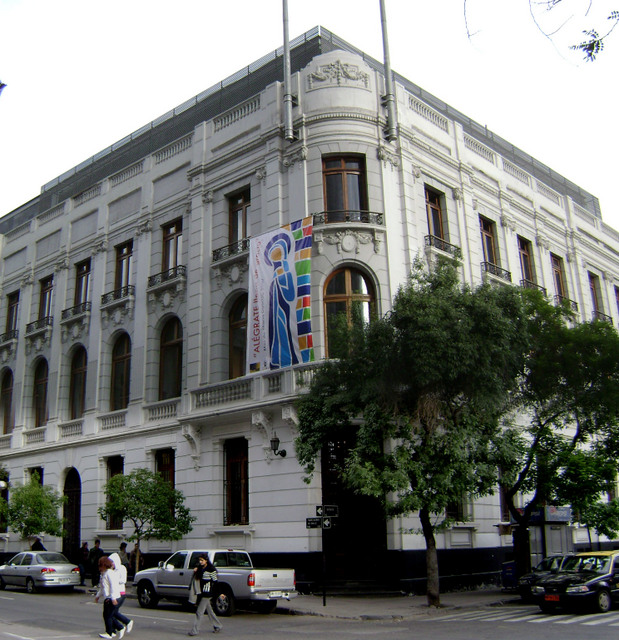
Palacio Eguiguren (Santiago, 1918)

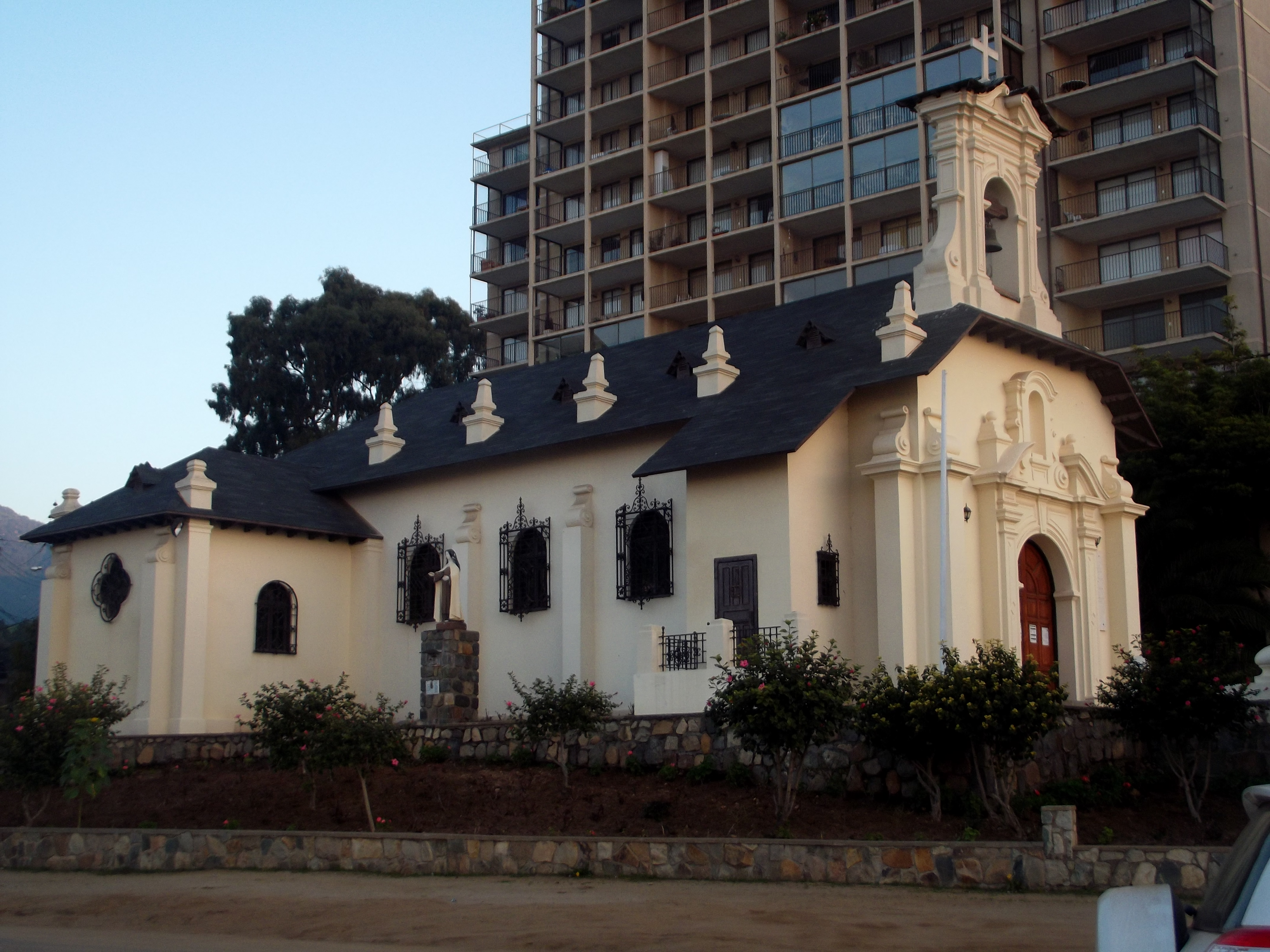
Iglesia de Nuestra Señora de Las Mercedes (Papudo) (Papudo, 1918)

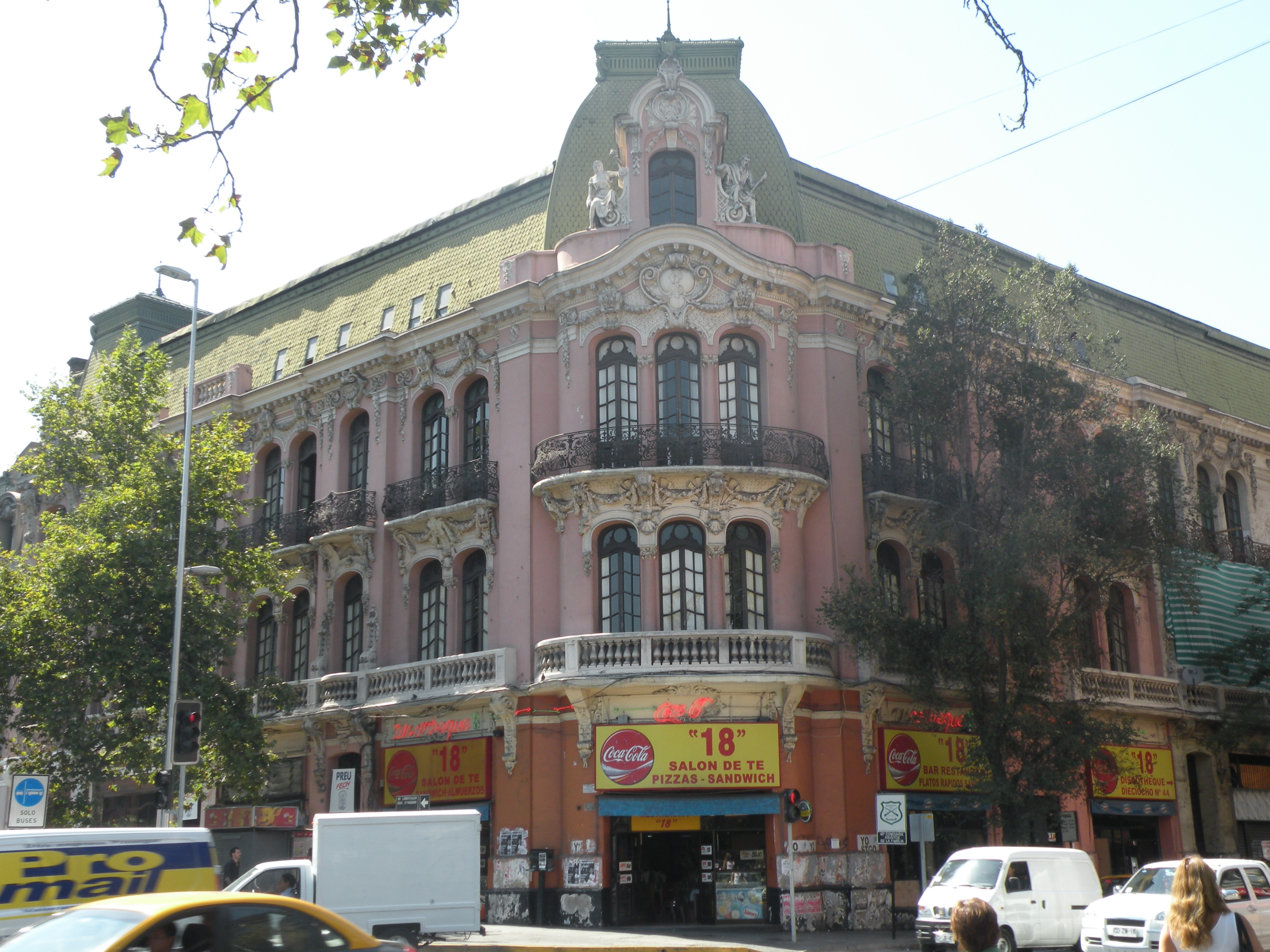
Palacio Íñiguez (1908)

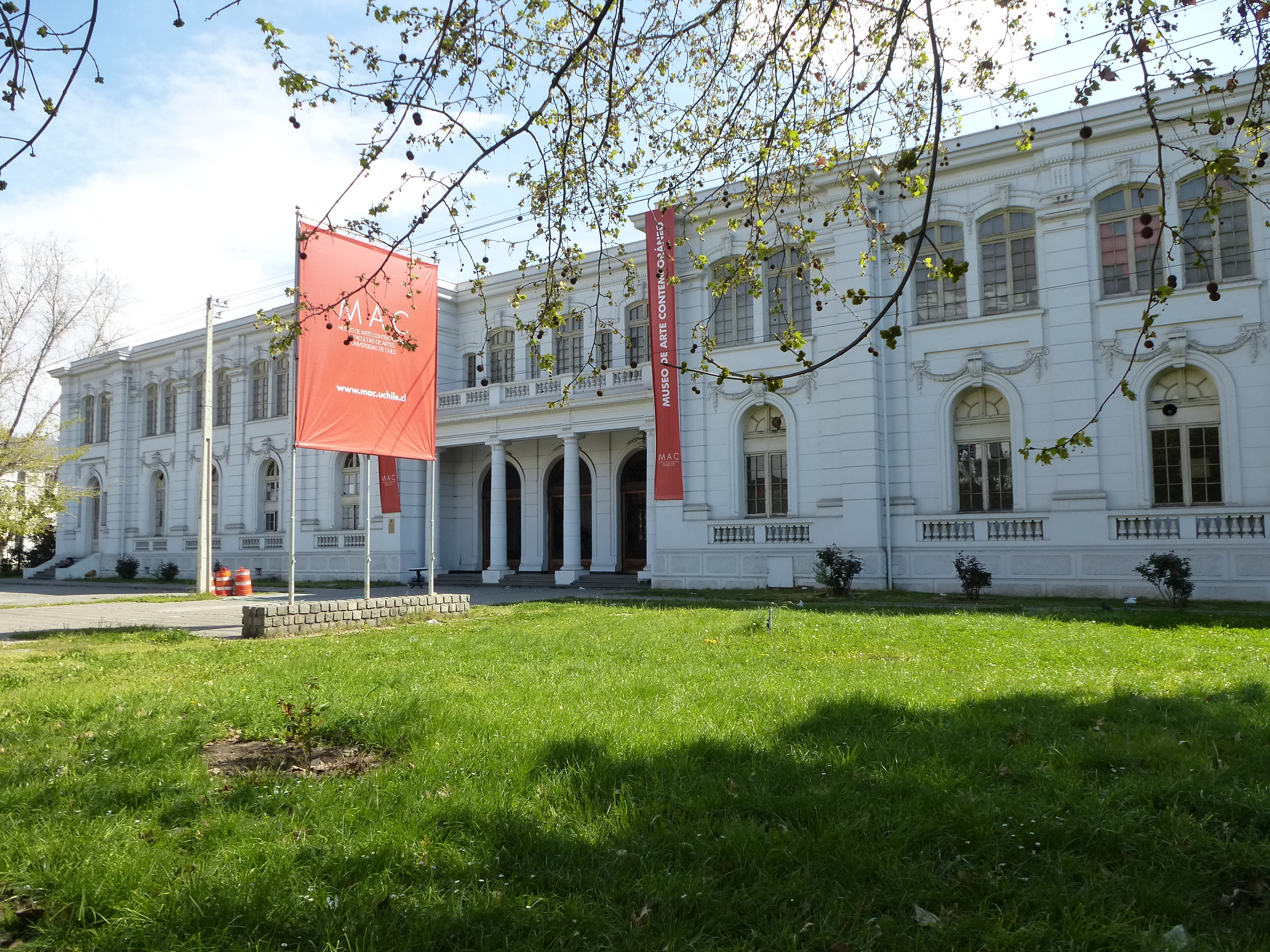
Palacio Versailles, former headquarters for the Sociedad Nacional de Agricultura (Santiago de Chile) (1918)

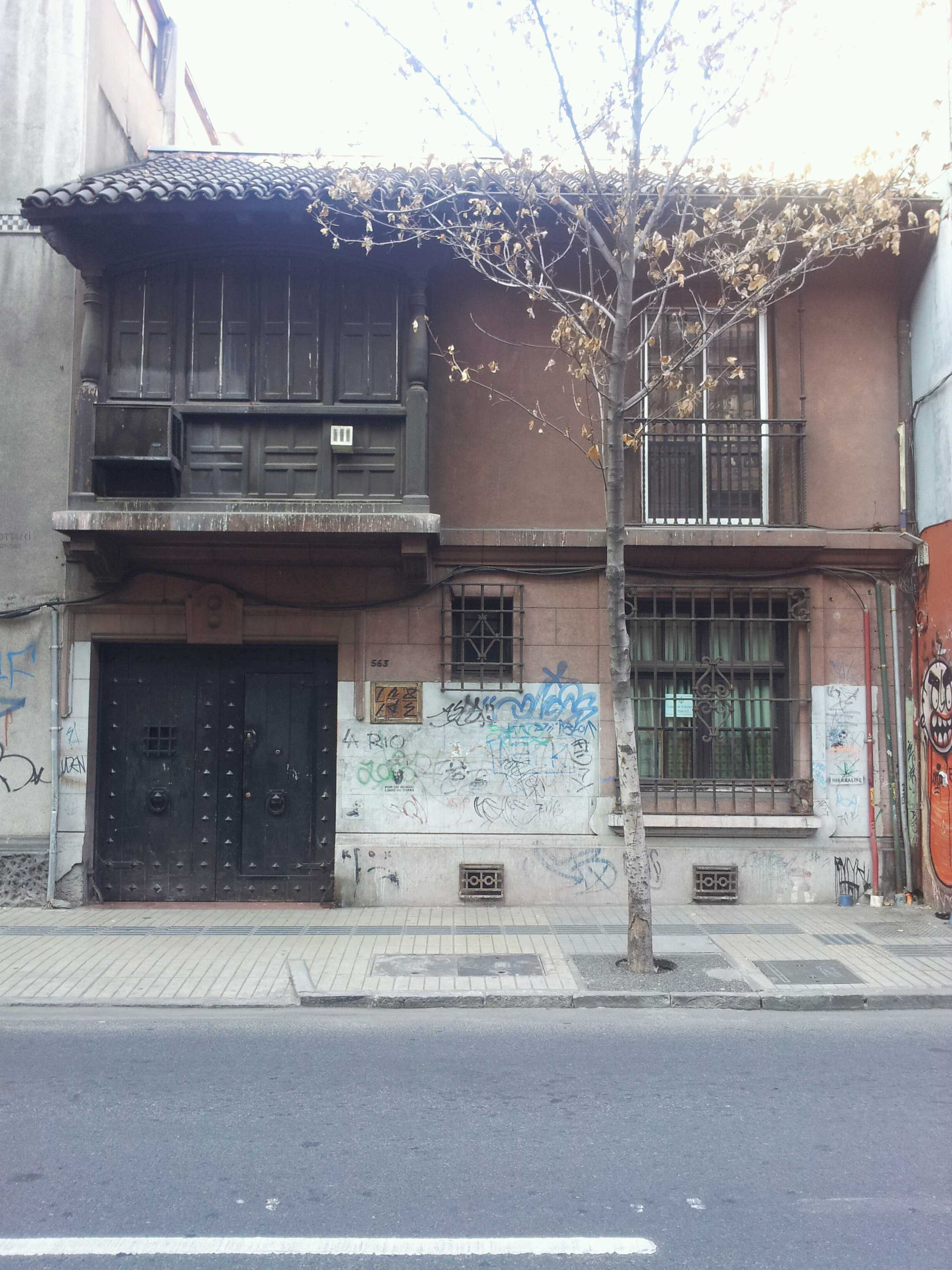
Edificio sede del Colegio de Enfermeras de Chile (1925)

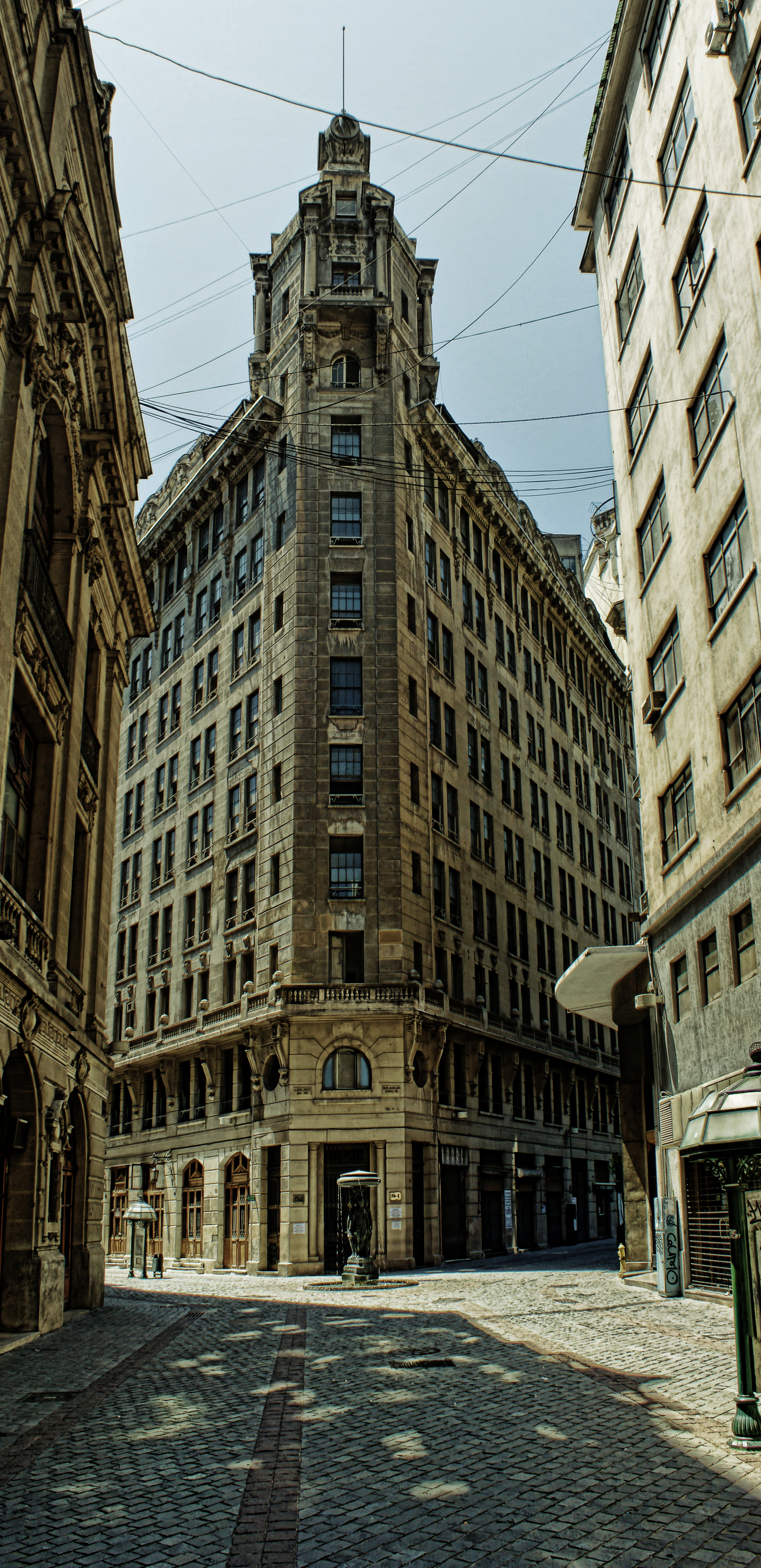
Edificio Ariztía, the first skyscraper in Santiago (1928)

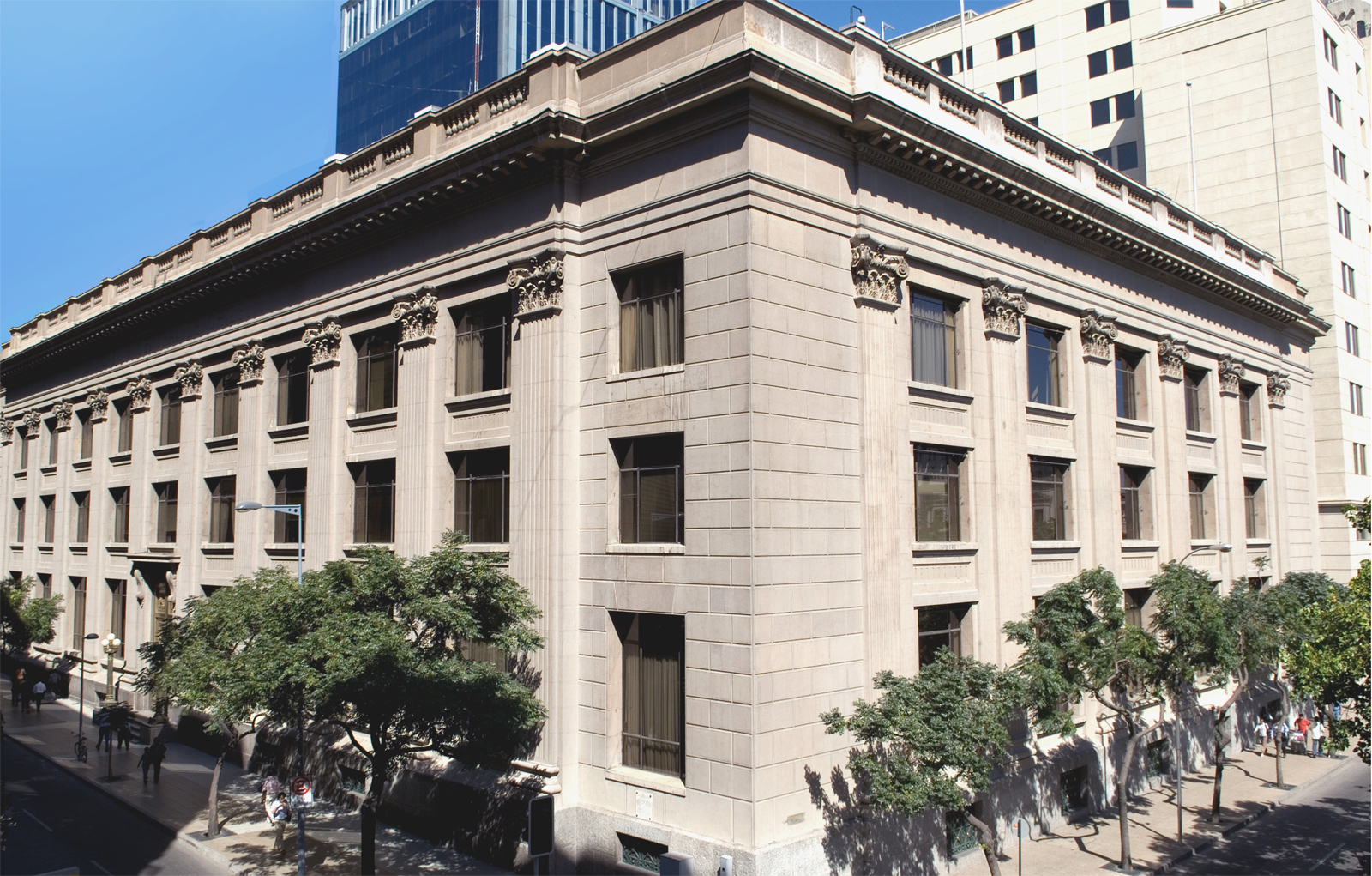
Edificio sede del Banco Central de Chile (1928)

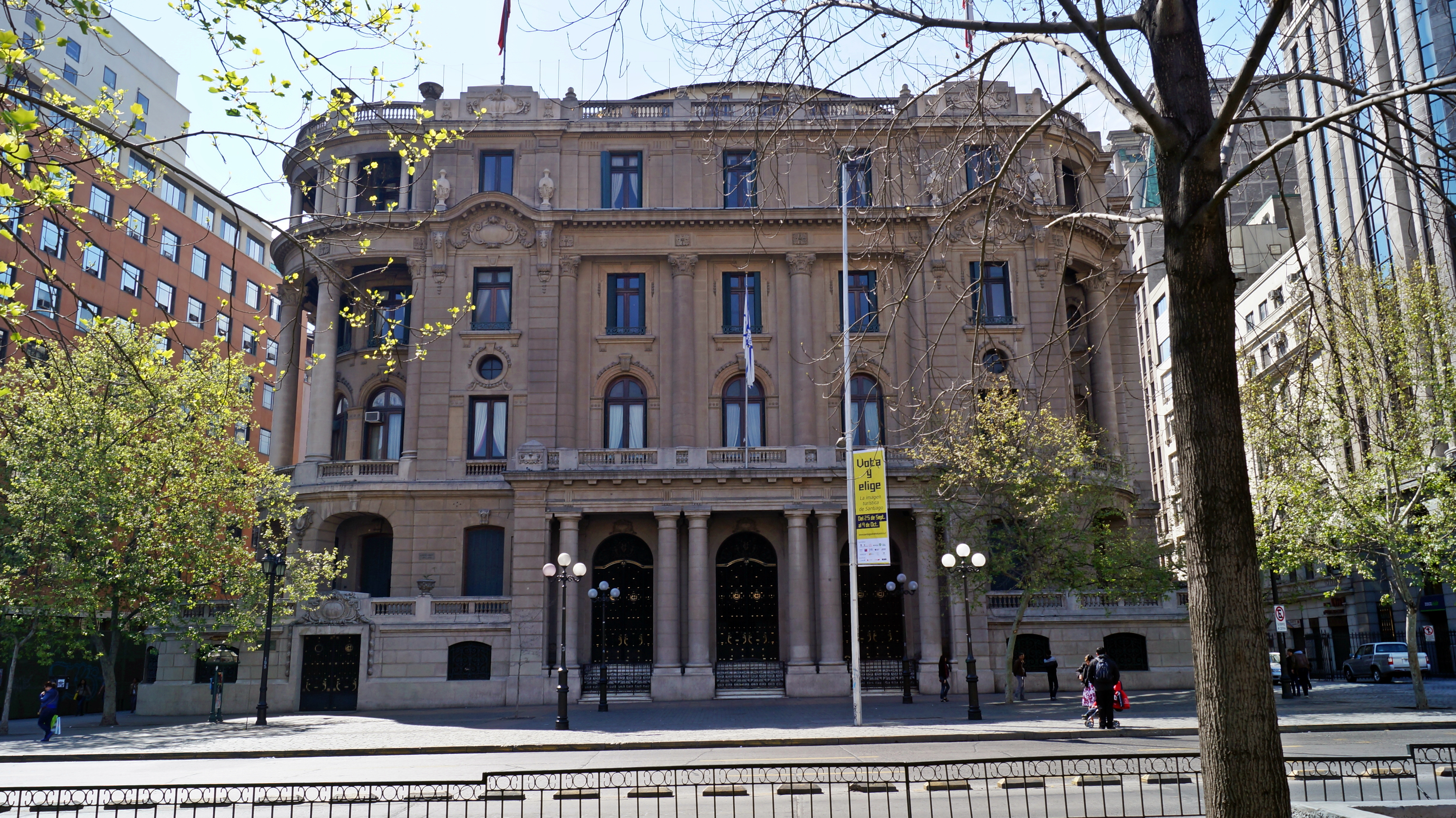
Edificio del Club de la Unión (1917-1925)

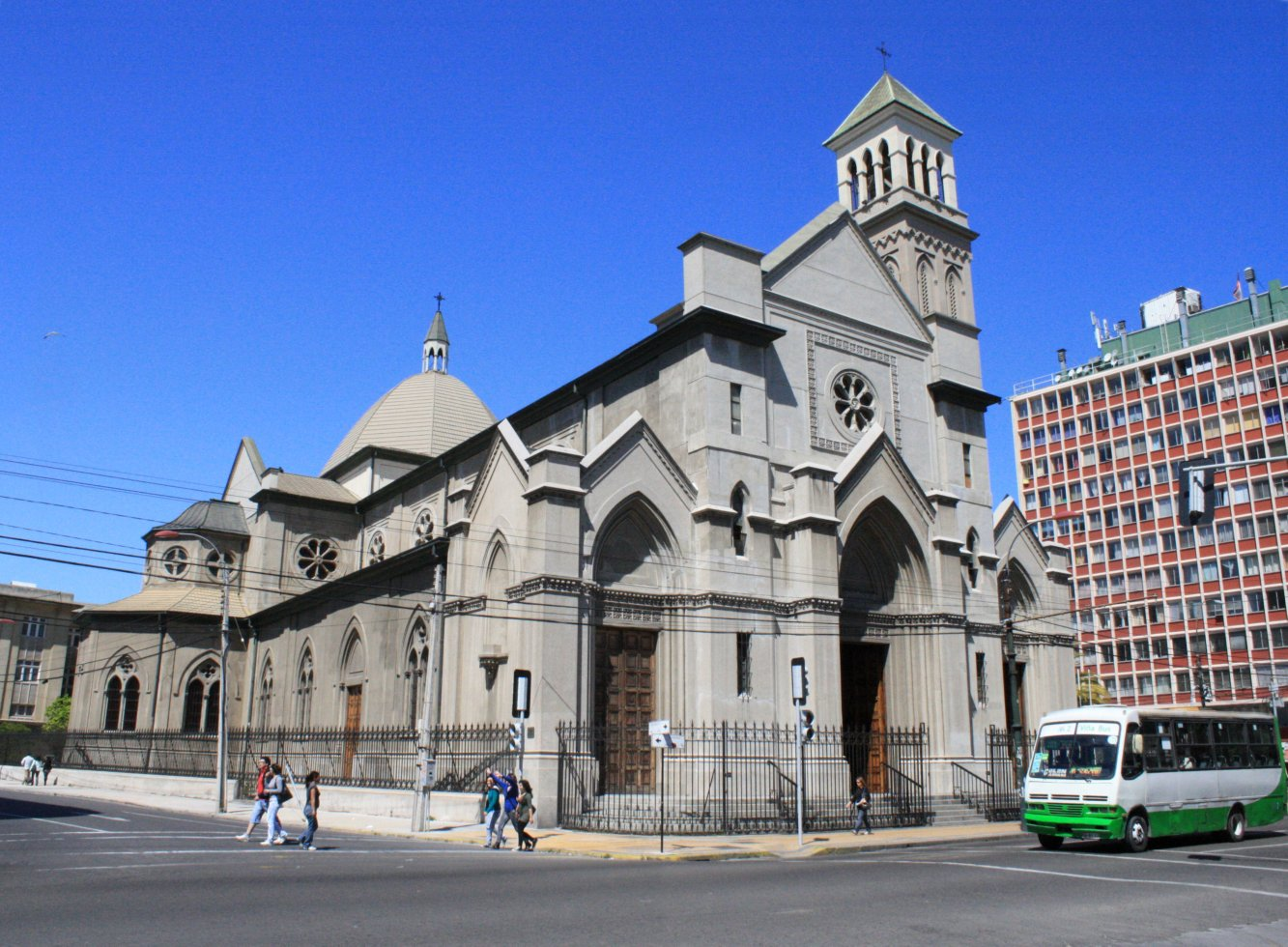
St. James Cathedral, Valparaíso (1910-1950)
