= Iglesia de Nuestra Señora de las Mercedes (Papudo) =

Church in Papudo, Chile

Coordinates: 32°30′23″S 71°26′58″W

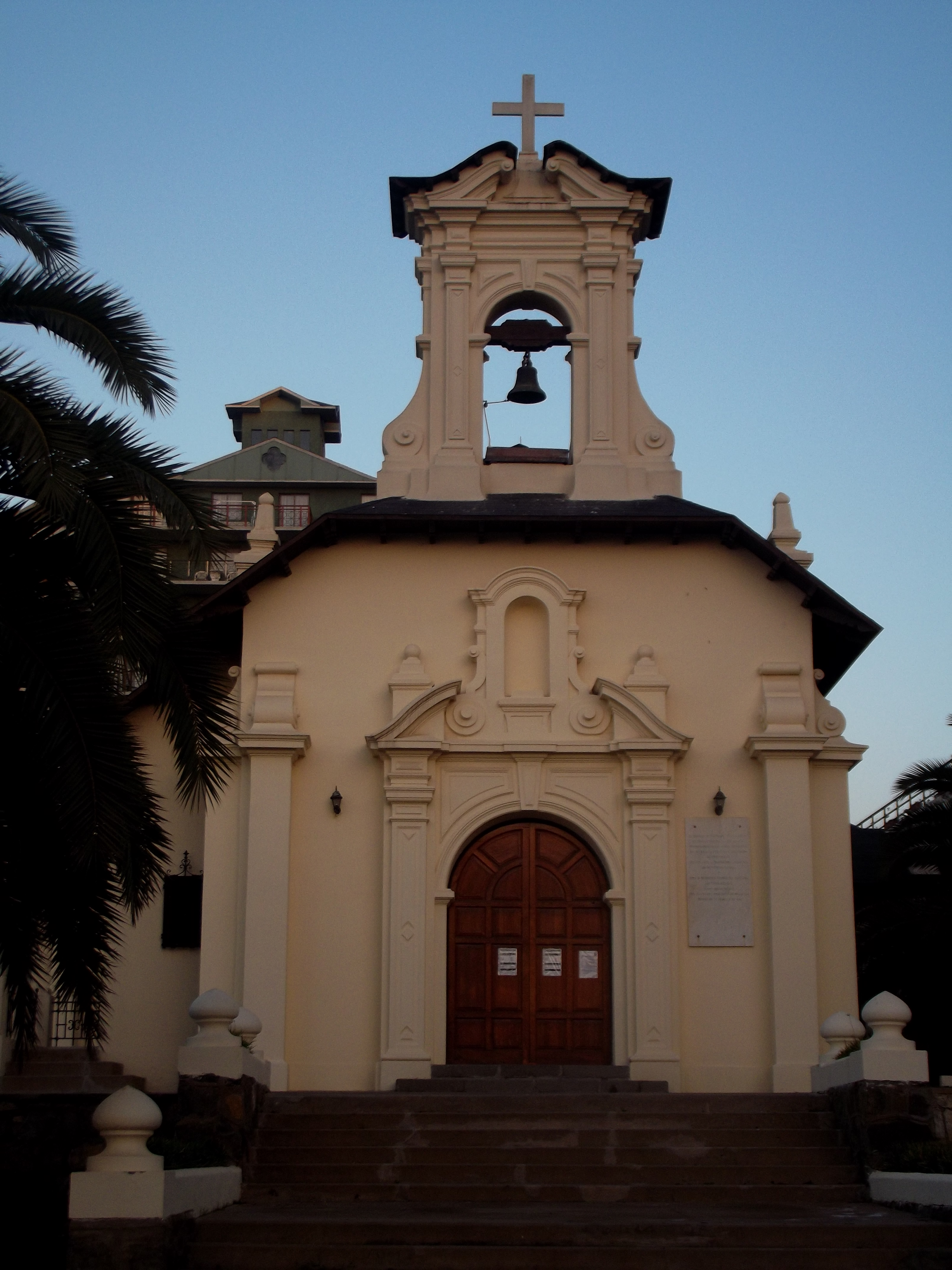

Religion
- Affiliation: Roman Catholic

Location
- Municipality: Papudo
- Country: Chile
- Interactive map of Iglesia de Nuestra Señora de las Mercedes

Architecture
- Architect: Alberto Cruz Montt

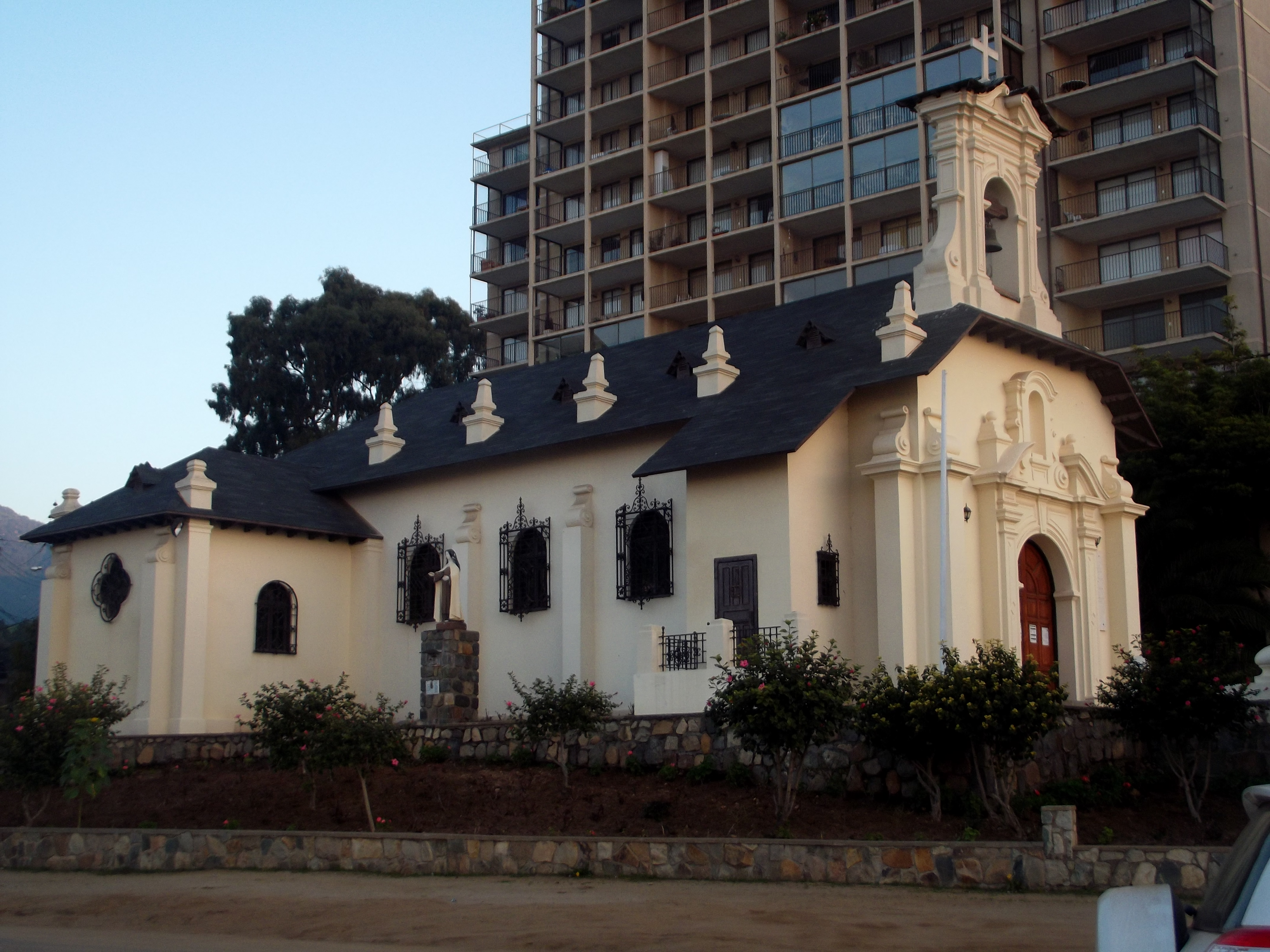
Oblique view

The Iglesia Nuestra Señora de Las Mercedes is a Catholic church located in Papudo, Valparaíso Region, Chile. It was declared as a National Historic Monument in 1995.

== History ==
Papudo was initially used as a port and began its development as a resort beach after the opening of a railroad to the town in the early 20th century. Since the mid-20th century, Papudo is exclusively a tourist destination.

The church was inaugurated on March 9, 1918. Its architect was Alberto Cruz Montt, who also designed the building housing the Central Bank of Chile and the Club de la Unión.

A church annex was demolished in the 2000s to build an apartment building.

The church was used as a location for the telenovela Sucupira.

== Description ==
The church, which faces the beach of Papudo, has a Latin Cross plan with single nave, and is built in the Spanish Colonial Revival style with Baroque details on its front facade. The walls of the transept and the nave are reinforced by buttresses, which are separated by windows that are protected by wrought-iron grilles. The wood shingle roof features exposed rafter tails. The church features a wood trusses ceiling and a bell-gable. Church furniture includes wood carved confessionals and wrought-iron lanterns.
