= St. James Lutheran Church =

St. James Lutheran Church may refer to

- Saint James Lutheran Church and School (Lafayette, Indiana)
- St. James Lutheran Church (Pohatcong Township, New Jersey), listed on the NRHP in Warren County, New Jersey
- St. James Lutheran Church (Portland, Oregon), listed on the NRHP in Portland, Oregon
- Saint James Evangelical Lutheran Church in Milwaukee, Wisconsin
