= St. James Anglican Church =

St. James Anglican Church may refer to:

- St. James Anglican Church (Newport Beach), a parish in the Diocese of Western Anglicans of the Anglican Church in North America
- St. James Anglican Church (Sonora), a California Historical Landmark
- St. James Anglican Church (Vancouver), a church building of the Anglican Church of Canada
- St. James Anglican Church (Calgary), a parish in the Anglican Diocese of Calgary of the Anglican Church of Canada
- St James' Anglican Church, Morpeth, New South Wales, Australia
- St James' Anglican Church, Morrisons, Victoria, Australia
- St James Anglican Church, Toowoomba, a heritage-listed church in Queensland, Australia
  - St James Parish Hall, Toowoomba, its heritage-listed parish hall
- St James' Church, Sydney, a heritage-listed Anglican Church in New South Wales, Australia
- St James Anglican Church, Māngere Bridge, New Zealand

== See also ==
- Our Lady and St James Church, Bangor, a former Anglican church in Wales
- St. James the Apostle Anglican Church
- St. James' Church (disambiguation)
