= Iñiguez palace =

Building in Santiago, Chile

- Palacio Íñiguez
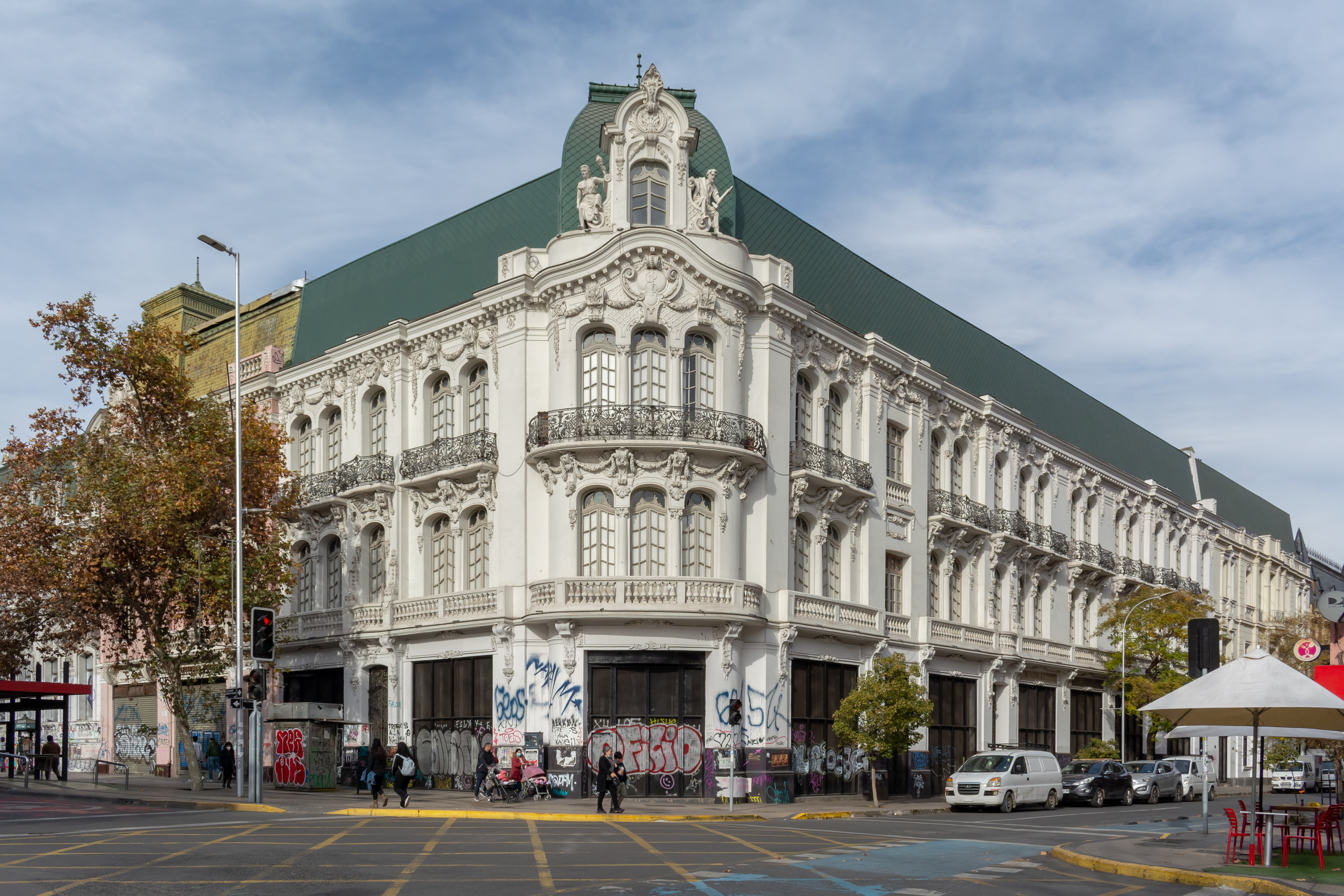
- The palace in 2022
- Interactive map of the Iñiguez palace area

General information
- Location: Libertador General Bernardo O'Higgins Avenue 1594, Barrio Dieciocho, Santiago, Chile
- Coordinates: 33°26′46″S 70°39′29″W
- Inaugurated: 1908
- Owner: Duoc UC

Design and construction
- Architects: Alberto Cruz Montt, Ricardo Larraín Bravo

Iñiguez palace (Spanish: Palacio Íñiguez) is a palace and historical building located in Santiago, Chile, within the Bario Dieciocho neighborhood. The palace is the headquarters of the Torres Pâtisserie.

== History ==
The building was built by Chilean architects Alberto Cruz Montt and Ricardo Larrain Bravo under a request of Eduardo Iñiguez Tagle and Loreto Undurraga to be used as their residence. The palace was completed in 1908. In 2013 the palace was burnt by a fire, and was later renovated in 2020 with the help of Duoc UC.
