= Edificio Ariztía =

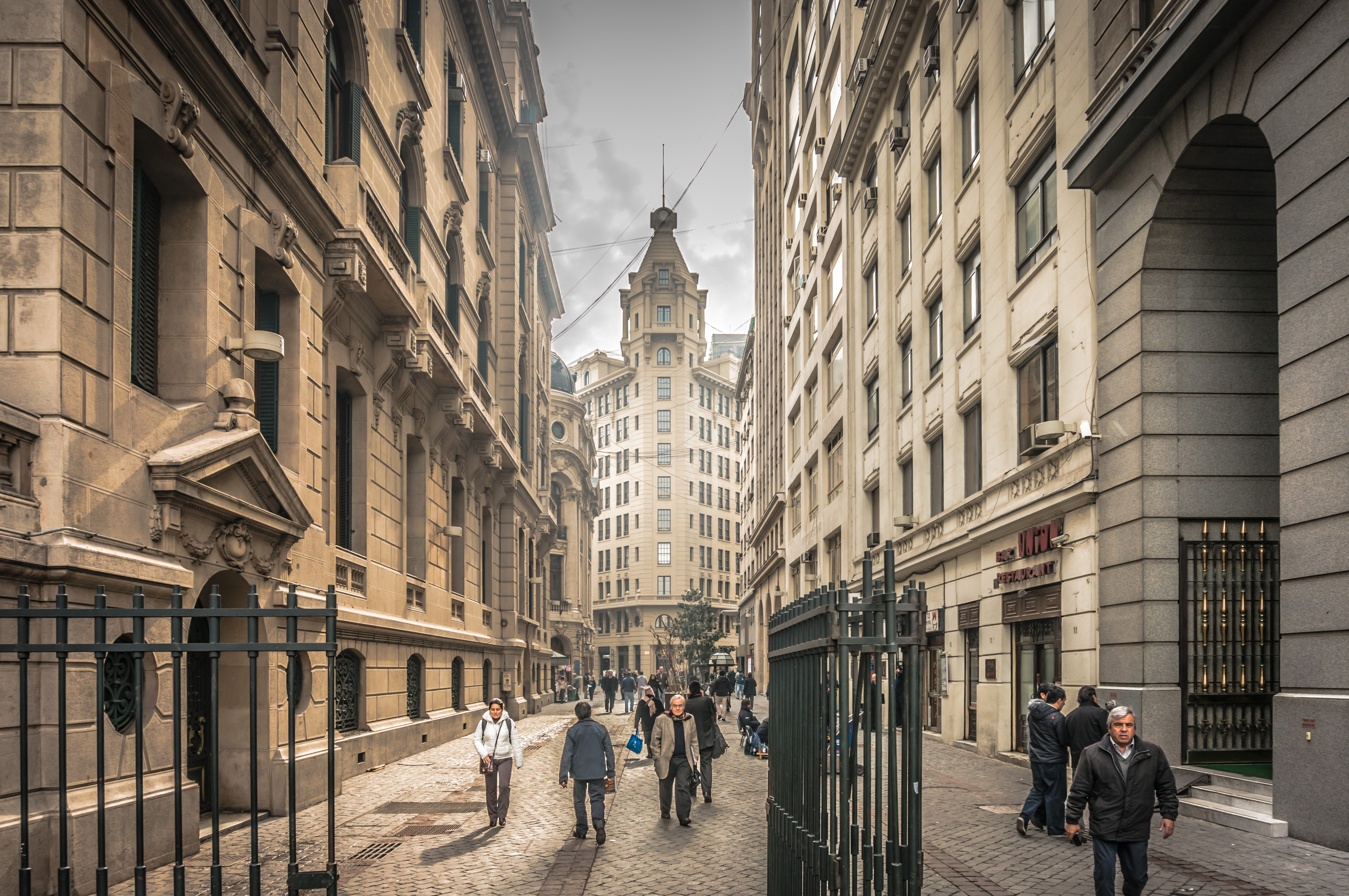
- Edificio Ariztía, sector calle Nueva York, La Bolsa and Club de la Unión
- Interactive map of the Edificio Ariztía area

General information
- Location: Santiago, Chile
- Coordinates: 33°26′33.21″S 70°39′04.34″W
- Completed: 1921

Design and construction
- Architect: Alberto Cruz Montt

Edificio Ariztía is a building located at 52 Nueva York Street in downtown Santiago, Chile, on a wedge-shaped city block. It was completed in 1921 and is considered the first "skyscraper" in Santiago. The building, constructed in reinforced concrete, was the first office building in Santiago with an elevator.
