= Wulff Castle =

Coordinates: 33°1′8.94″S 71°33′54.6″W

- Castillo Wulff
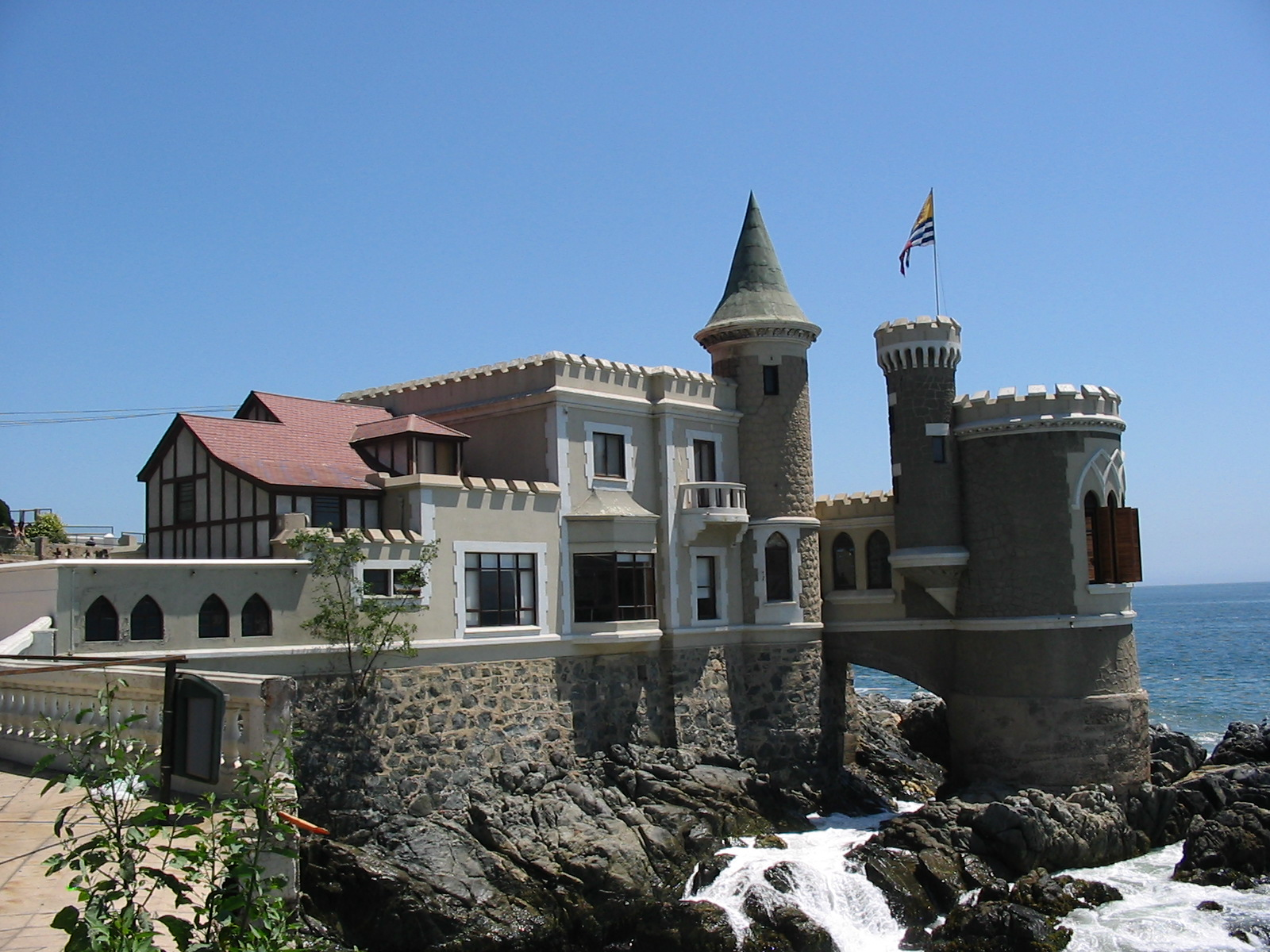
- Northern view
- Interactive map of the Wulff Castle area

General information
- Type: Castle
- Location: 37 Marina Avenue, Viña del Mar, Chile
- Completed: 1906
- Client: Gustavo Adolfo Wulff Mowle

Wulff Castle (Spanish: Castillo Wulff) is a historic castle overlooking the sea in Viña del Mar, Chile. It was built in 1906 for the Wulff family. It is the headquarters of the city heritage center.

== History ==
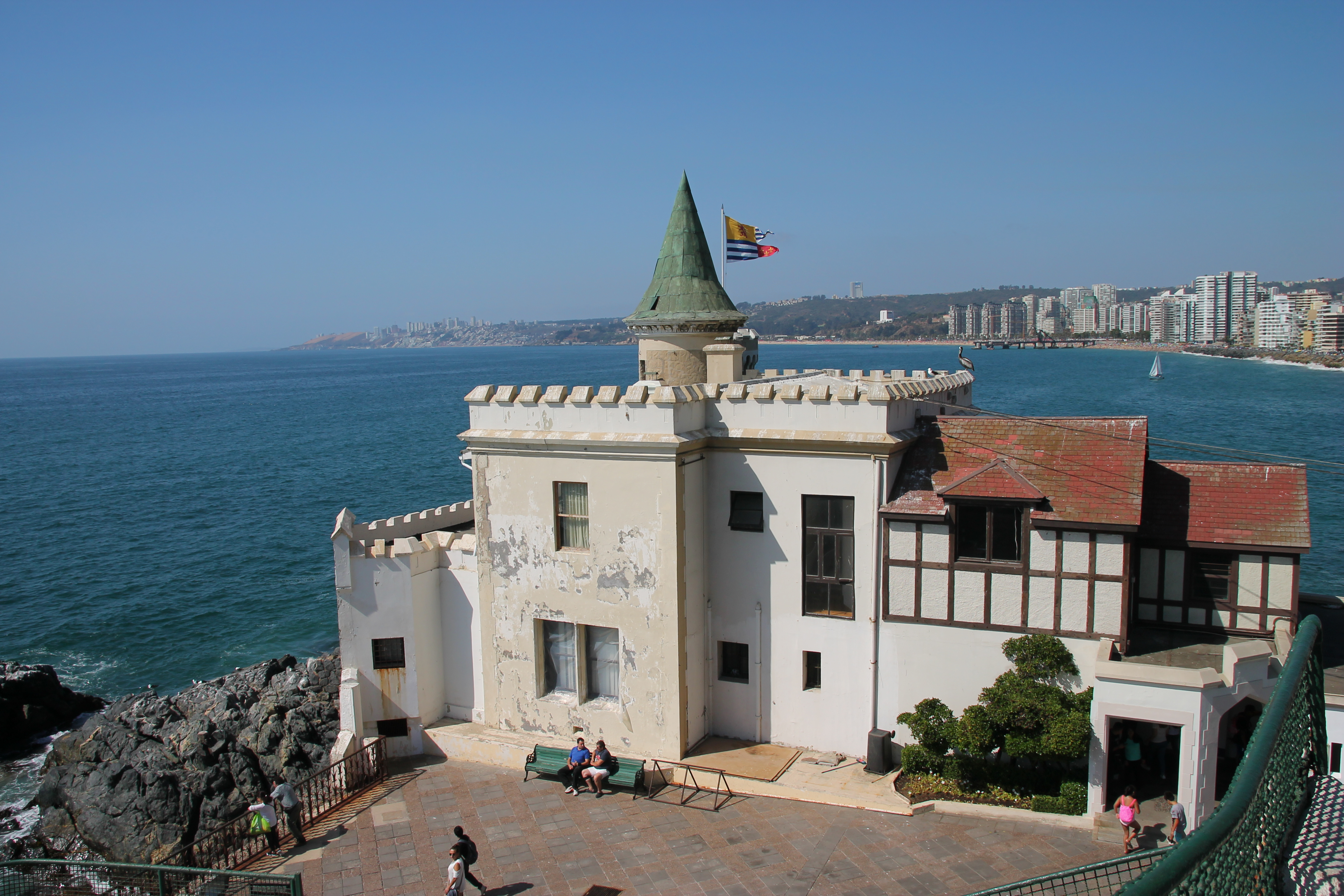
Wulff Castle in 2019

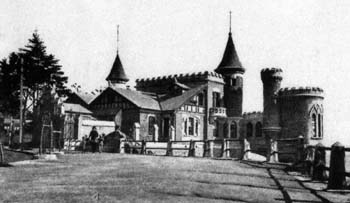
The castle in 1930

Gustavo Adolfo Wulff Mowle, German saltpeter and coal trader, as well as maritime transporter, migrated to Chile in 1881. In 1904, he bought from Dr. Teodoro Von Schoeders 1,260 square metres (13,600 sq ft) in front of Cerro Castillo (Castle Hill), in Viña del Mar. He built the new house in 1906. By 1917, Wulff hired architect Alberto Cruz Montt to make the house into a castle. Eventually a new tower was added built upon some rocks on the northern side of the castle, and a bridge joined them together.

In 1946, Mrs. Esperanza Artaza Matta inherited the property, and asked another architect, José Alcalde, to remodel it. The southern tower was removed.

The City bought the castle in 1959. From 1960 until 1988, it housed the Museo Naval de la Armada de Chile (Chilean Navy Forces Museum). Between 1990 and 1999, it lodged the collection of the writer Salvador Reyes Figueroa. In 1995, it was pronounced a National Historical Monument by Chilean Law.
