= St. Jacobi Church, Wuhu =

St. James's Church, Wuhu
- 芜湖圣雅各教堂
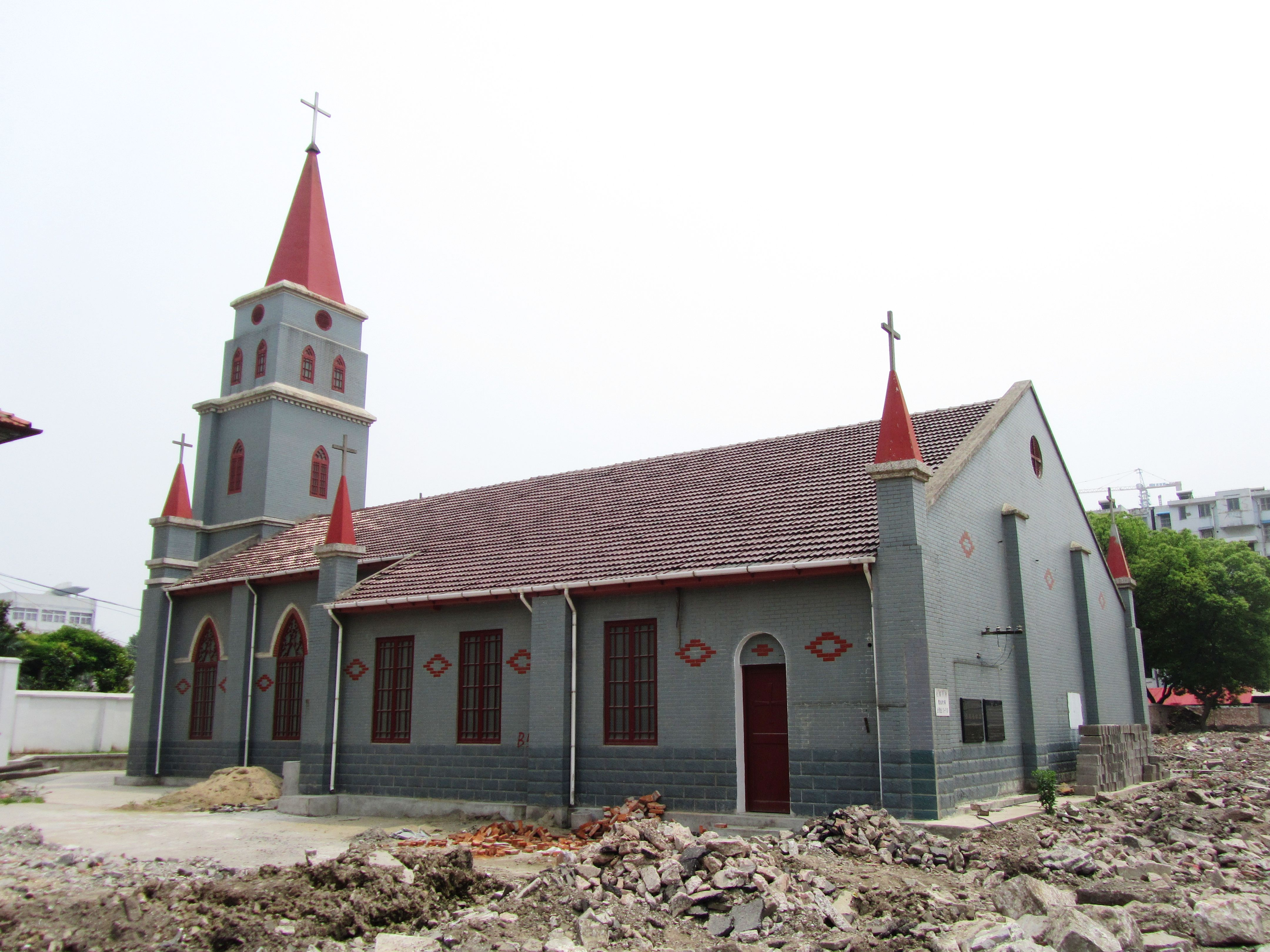
- St. James's Church, Wuhu in 2012

- Location in Anhui
- 31°19′42″N 118°23′01″E
- Location: Jinghu District, Wuhu, Anhui, China
- Denomination: Protestantism

History
- Status: Parish church
- Founded: 1905

Architecture
- Functional status: Active
- Architectural type: Church building
- Style: Gothic architecture

Specifications
- Materials: Granite, bricks

Chinese name
- Simplified Chinese: 芜湖圣雅各教堂
- Traditional Chinese: 蕪湖聖雅各教堂
Transcriptions
Standard Mandarin
- Hanyu Pinyin: Wúhú Shèngyǎgé Jiàotáng

St. James's Church, Wuhu (Chinese: 芜湖圣雅各教堂) is a Protestant church located in Jinghu District, Wuhu, Anhui, China.

== History ==
St. James's Church's history stretches back to 1905, founded by the Episcopal Church.

In June 2011, the church was moved 10 metres (33 ft) eastward. The church was inscribed as a municipal cultural relic preservation organ in October 2001 and a provincial cultural relic preservation organ in December 2012, respectively.

== Architecture ==
The church has a width of 16.29 metres (53.4 ft), a depth of 27.87 metres (91.4 ft) and a construction area of 389 square metres (4,190 sq ft). The bell tower is 25 metres (82 ft) high and adopts Gothic architectural style.
