= St Philip and St James Church =

St Philip and St James Church may refer to:

- St Philip and St James Church, Ilfracombe, England
- St Philip and St James Church, Leckhampton, England
- Church of St Philip and St James, Norton St Philip, England
- St Philip and St James Church, Oxford, England
- St Philip and St James' Church, Plaistow, England
- Church of St Philip and St James, Tow Law, England
- St Philip and St James Church, Up Hatherley, England
- St Philip and St James Church, Whitton, England
- St. Philip and St. James Church, Booterstown, Dublin, Ireland
