= St. James's Church, Kastelaz =

Church building in South Tyrol, Italy

Coordinates: 46°20′40″N 11°14′30″E

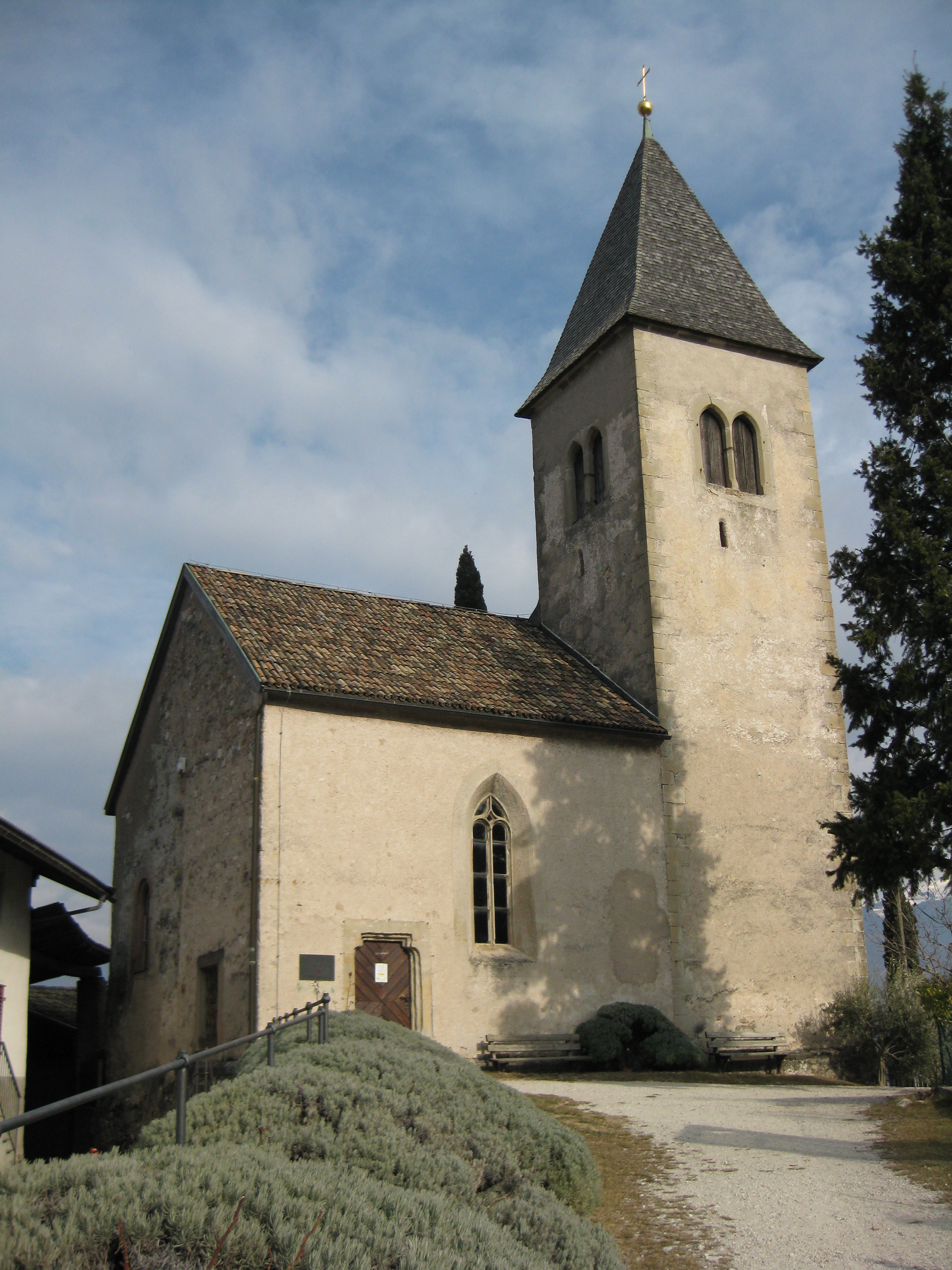
St. James's Church, Kastelaz

St. James's Church (German: St. Jakob in Kastelaz) is a church on the Kastelaz hill in Tramin an der Weinstraße, South Tyrol (Italy), which is known foremost for its Romanesque frescos.

The church is sometimes mistakenly called St. Jacob's. The confusion arises because German, like many other languages, uses the same word for both James and Jacob.

== History ==
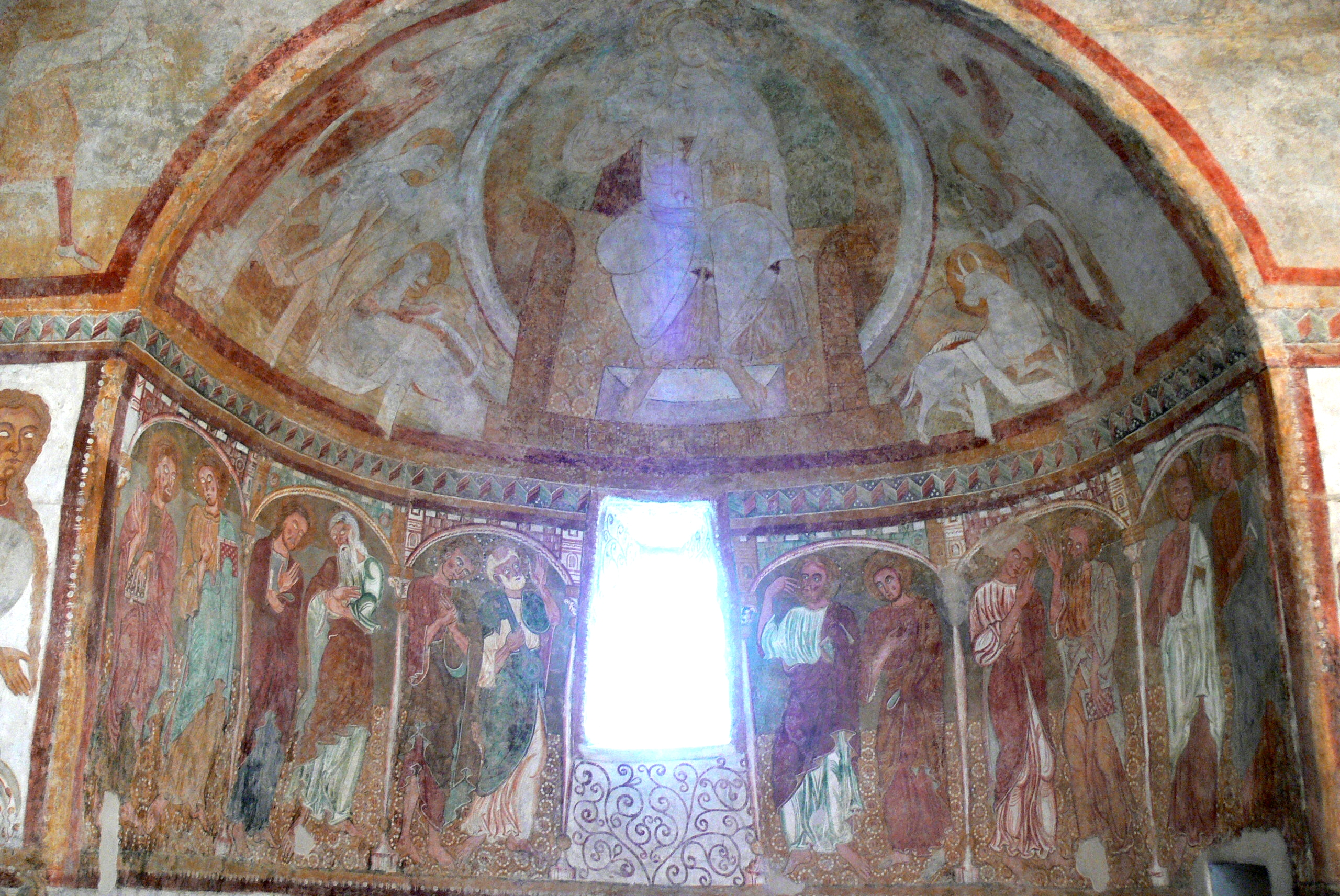
The apse, decorated with some of the oldest Romanesque frescos in the German sprachraum

The church was built at the beginning of the 13th century. Before the church was built there was an ancient Roman place of worship dedicated to the goddess Isis on the spot. The first church consisted of a rectangular nave and an apse. A Gothic southern aisle was added in 1440 and only in 1500 was the sacristy on the northern side of the church added.

== Frescos ==
St. James's Church contains one of the oldest set of frescos in the German sprachraum.

=== Romanesque ===
The socle of the apse contains frescos depicting beasts and threatening imaginary animals. Above this, the twelve apostles are depicting in pairs. The ceiling of the apse has a fresco showing Christ in Majesty. The socle of the chancel arch contains to the left and right depictions of Atlas, and higher up a bird-woman and a capricorn. In the spandrel, Cain and Abel are portrayed.

=== Gothic ===
The church is also richly decorated with Gothic frescos, made by Ambrosius Gander.

== Bibliography ==
- Verena Friedrich: Tramin: St. Jakob in Kastelaz. Peda-Kunstführer 781, Kunstverlag Peda-Passau 2010, ISBN 38-9643-781-X.
- Ursula Düriegl: Die Fabelwesen von St. Jakob in Kastelaz bei Tramin. Romanische Bilderwelt antiken und vorantiken Ursprungs. Böhlau Verlag, Wien 2003, ISBN 32-0577-039-0.
