= St. Jakobus, Rüdesheim =

St. Jakobus
- St. Jakobus Rüdesheim
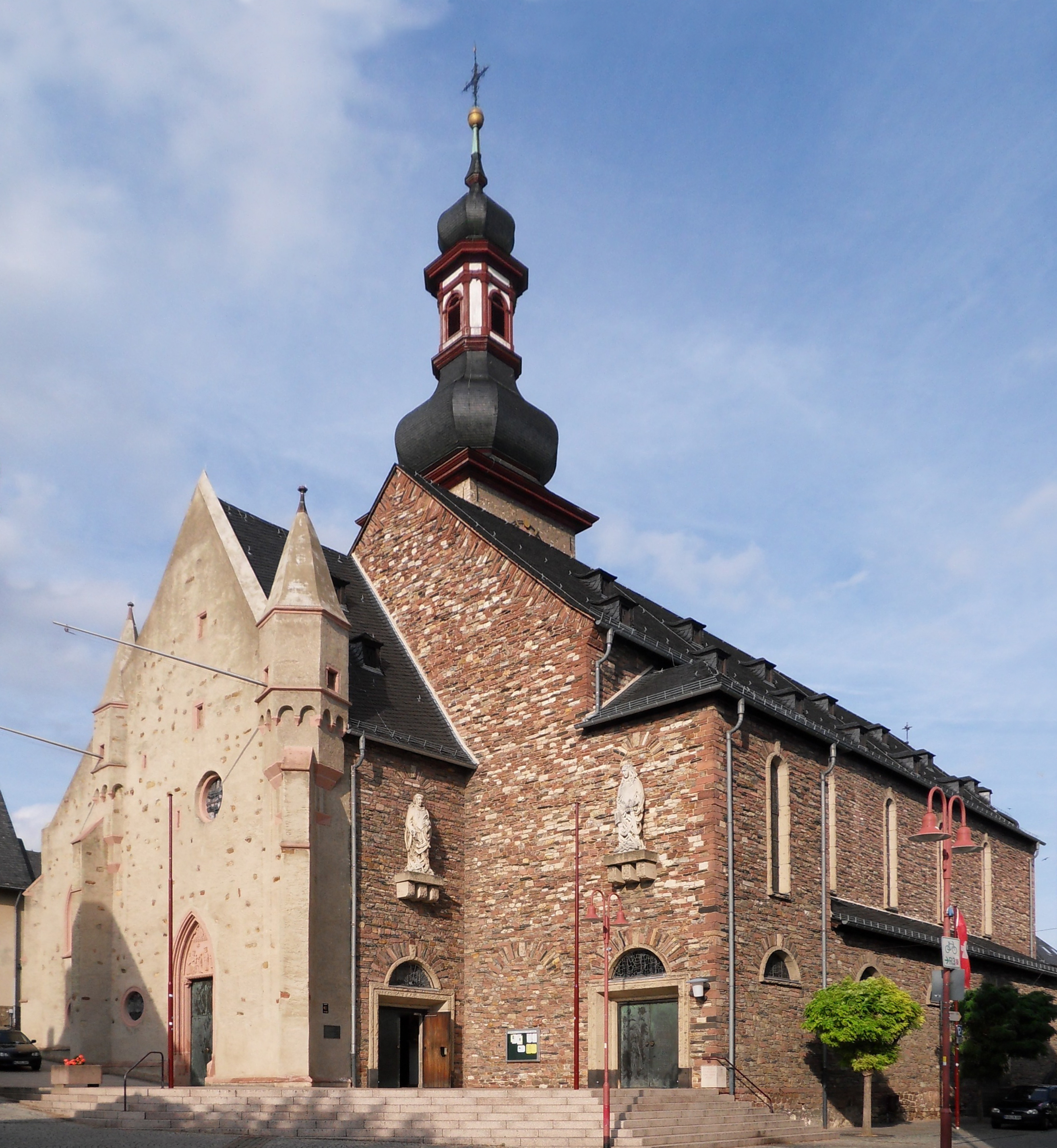
- The church from the market square
- St. Jakobus
- 49°58′45″N 7°55′26″E
- Location: Rüdesheim am Rhein, Hesse
- Country: Germany
- Denomination: Catholic
- Website: heilig-kreuz-rheingau.de/kirchorte/orte/ruedesheim/

History
- Status: church
- Dedication: James, son of Zebedee
- Consecrated: c. 1400
- Events: restoration 1984/85

Architecture
- Heritage designation: listed
- Demolished: 25 November 1944

Administration
- Diocese: Diocese of Limburg
- Parish: Heilig Kreuz Geisenheim

St. Jakobus is a Catholic church and a former parish in Rüdesheim am Rhein, Hesse, Germany. It dates back to the 10th century, was expanded around 1400, and again in 1913/14. The church was severely damaged by bombing in World War II, and rebuilt from 1947 to 1956. It is a listed historic monument and serves also as a concert venue.

== History ==
The oldest parts of the building from the 10th century are found in the basement of the northern tower. An early-Romanesque chapel dates back to the 11th century.

The present church was founded c. 1400 by Johann Brömser. It was first an aisleless church, dedicated to James, son of Zebedee. In 1489, it was expanded by a northern nave and vaulted. Baroque changes were a new helmet for the steeple from 1766 and a high altar. The building was expanded further in 1913/24 to the east and south. The church burnt down by bombing on 25 November 1944. The only surviving features are the western facade, the northern nave and the tower. The church was rebuilt, in modified form and again with a flat ceiling, from 1947 to 1956. The foundation of the rebuilding was laid on 25 July 1947, the feast day of the patron saint that year. It was celebrated in 2017 with services, an exhibition, and concerts.

The parish was merged as to a larger parish on 1 January 2015. It is now part (Kirchort) of the parish Heilig Kreuz Rheingau, with the central church in Geisenheim.

The church is also a venue for concerts of sacred music, including a venue of the Rheingau Musik Festival which held a concert of chamber music with organ in 2017.

== Organ ==
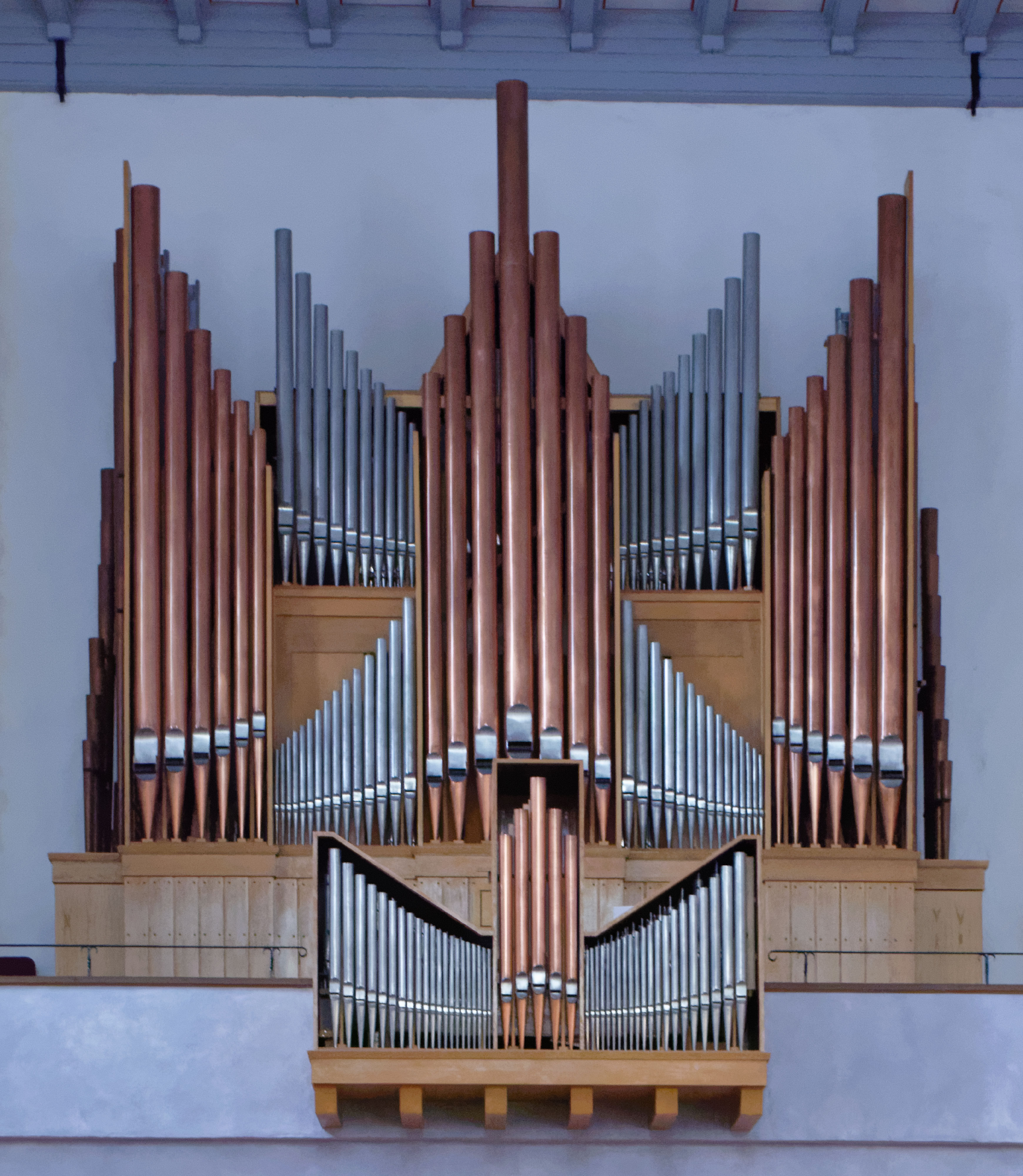
The organ

The organ was built in 1964 by the company Wagenbach from Limburg, first with 40 stops on three manuals and pedal. It was renovated and expanded in 1996 to 44 stops by Oberlinger (Windesheim). In 2014, another stop was added, Contraposaune (contra trombone), a low stop rare in the state of Hesse, making the organ the largest organ in the Rheingau, used for the liturgy and for concerts.
