= Club de la Unión (Chile) =

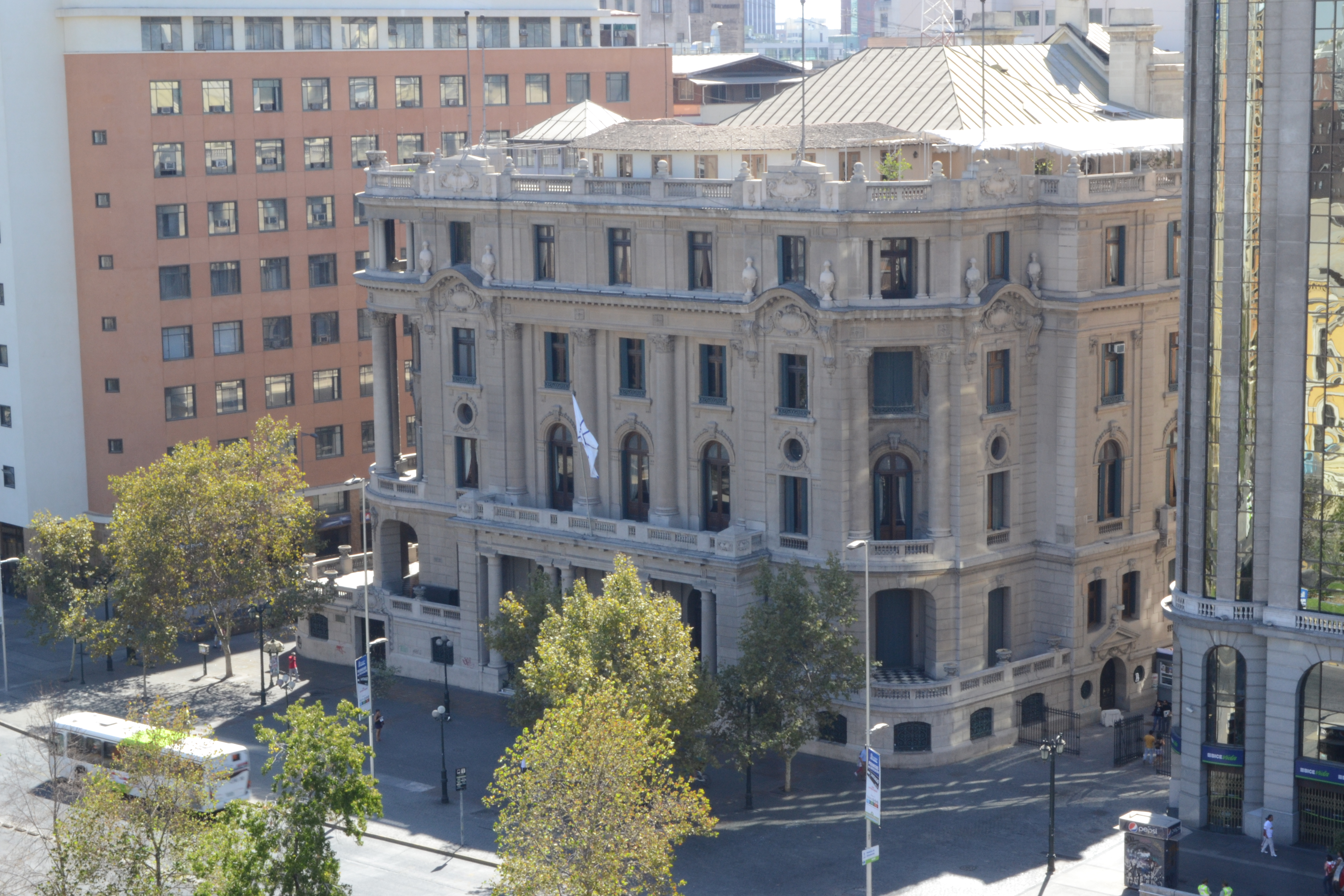
- Interactive map of the Club de la Unión area

General information
- Location: Santiago, Chile
- Coordinates: 33°26′36.13″S 70°39′5.4″W
- Completed: 1925

Design and construction
- Architect: Alberto Cruz Montt

The Club de la Unión is a gentlemen's club in Santiago, Chile. The name derives from the fact the club united rich men coming together from opposing political parties. Club members met for the first time on July 8, 1864 and its first president was Manuel José Yrarrázaval Larraín.

The club was housed in different locations through downtown Santiago for the first decades. Its current housing was completed in 1925 and was declared a national monument in 1981.
