= St. James the Apostle Cathedral, Santiago de Veraguas =

St. James the Apostle Cathedral
- Catedral de Santiago Apóstol
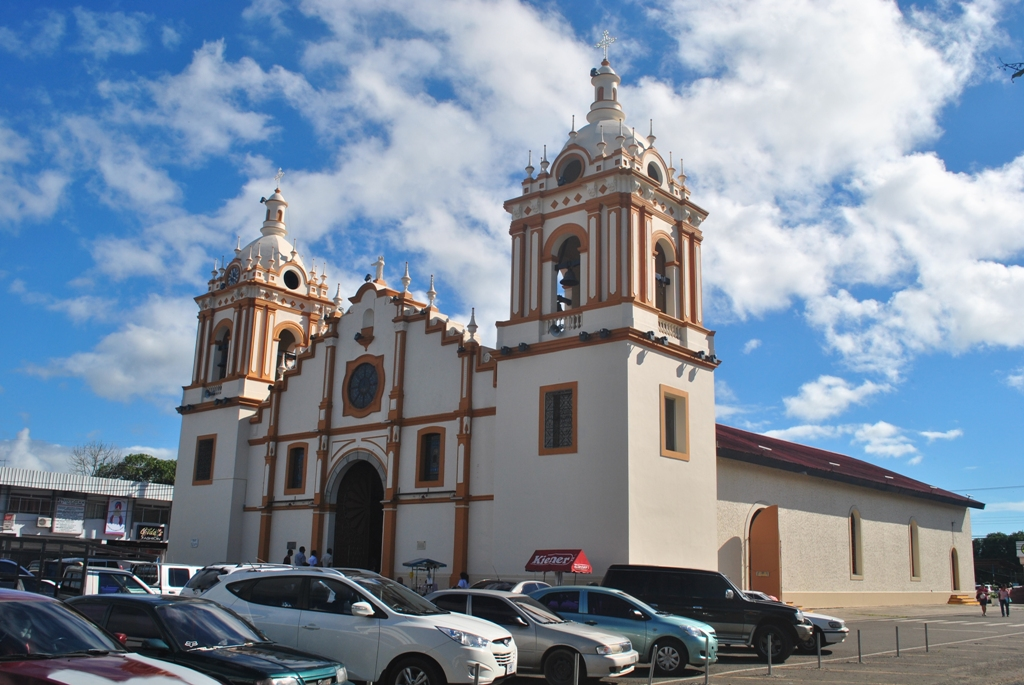
- St. James the Apostle Cathedral
- 8°05′50″N 80°59′00″W
- Location: Santiago de Veraguas
- Country: Panama
- Denomination: Roman Catholic Church

The St. James the Apostle Cathedral (Spanish: Catedral de Santiago Apóstol ) also called Santiago de Veraguas Cathedral is a religious building belonging to the Catholic Church and is located in the city of Santiago de Veraguas in the Veraguas province in the western part of Panama. It was declared a historical monument in 2014.

The temple follows the Roman or Latin rite and functions as the mother church of the Diocese of Santiago de Veraguas (Dioecesis Sancti Iacobi veraguensis) which was created in 1963 by bull "Panamensis Ecclesiae" of Pope Paul VI.

The church is under the pastoral responsibility of the Bishop Audilio Aguilar Aguilar.

During the festivities of St. James the church organized processions and celebrations in honor of the patron saint of the city. In June 2015 there was held a Mass asking for the repose of the late Panamanian President Juan Demóstenes Arosemena who ruled the nation between 1936 and 1939 and whose remains were transferred from the cathedral to a mausoleum in the Normal School Juan Demóstenes Arosemena.

== See also ==
- Roman Catholicism in Panama

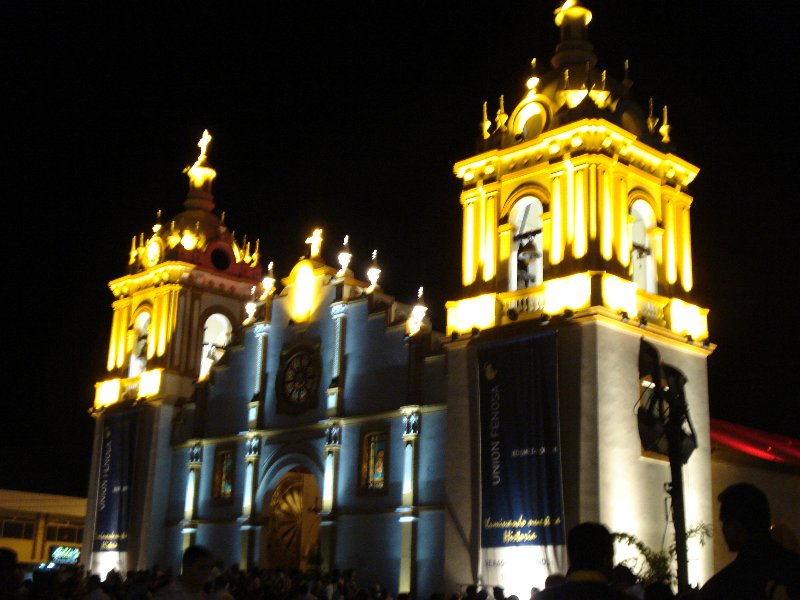
Another View
