= Saint James Evangelical Lutheran Church =

Church in Milwaukee, Wisconsin

Coordinates: 43°03′23.6″N 87°59′13.1″W

St. James Ev. Lutheran Church
- Saint James Evangelical Lutheran Church of Milwaukee, Wisconsin
- St. James Ev. Lutheran Church
- Location: 2028 N. 60th St.
- Country: United States
- Denomination: Wisconsin Evangelical Lutheran Synod
- Website: http://www.saintjames-mke.org

History
- Founded: May 29, 1921

Architecture
- Years built: 1924

Clergy
- Pastor: Rev. Christian Marquardt

Saint James Evangelical Lutheran Church is a Lutheran congregation in the Washington Heights neighborhood of Milwaukee. It is a member of the Wisconsin Evangelical Lutheran Synod (WELS).

== History ==
St. James began in 1916 as a mission church based in the vicinity of the current building. In 1917, the church operated out of a small chapel near the intersection of 54th and Pabst Avenue (now Lloyd Street). Some time later, the mission was relocated to the southwest corner of 60th and Lloyd, across from the Synod's Seminary. On May 20, 1921 St. James congregation was officially organized. When the seminary relocated, the church moved its chapel for a third time, to the east side of the intersection, where the church is situated today. After this move, a 16' x 24' school room was added to the chapel in 1922 at a cost of $1,204.44. Though the building was completed, the Christian day school wasn't opened until 1923.

On October 19, 1924, the cornerstone was laid for the church's current sanctuary, the dedication taking place on May 17, 1925. The church's original pipe organ was purchased in December 1927. The four-room, two-story school-house addition was added to the school and dedicated on May 22, 1938. Only two of the four rooms were finished at that time; the other two were completed in 1939 and 1945.

Some of St. James's most extensive renovations include the roof renovation of 1965 (again renovated a few years ago), an extensive renovation of the sanctuary that same year, and the rebuilding of the organ in 1968. In 2003 the organ was replaced with a hybrid digital/pipe organ. The latest addition, completed in 1988, includes a gymnasium, offices, and storage areas.

== Ministry ==
The mission statement at St. James is

- "Compelled by Christ's love, we grow in the Word and go with the Word."

To meet the demands of these differing communities, St. James has changed its mission focus, especially since its school, once the focal point of its ministry, is no longer in existence. St. James has gone with a "Small Group" ministry, whose goal is to engage the entire congregation in fellowship, while encouraging the membership to bring family, friends, and neighbors along. The current small groups available are:

- 50 Plus Fellowship
- Knitted Together
- Men's Morning Ministry
- Sunday Morning Bible Study
- Women's Morning Ministry

== School ==
St. James operated a Christian day school throughout many years of its history. Due to economic hardship and declining enrollment, the Assembly of Voters (congregational meeting) approved the Church Council's recommendation to close the school, officially ending it after the 2005-2006 school year. In September of 1994 a Preschool was added to the Christian Day School. St. James continues to offer a Preschool that has both a morning session and an afternoon session.

== Called workers ==
=== Pastors ===
In its history, St. James has had five pastors:

- Pastor Arthur Voss 1921 to 1954
- Pastor Waldemar Pless 1954 to 1979
- Pastor John Braun 1977 to 1984
- Pastor Peter Kassulke 1984 to 2017
- Pastor Christian Marquardt 2017-present

=== Deacons ===
In 2001, St. James extended a call to its first deacon (also called "Staff Minister"). The call encompassed the fields of Outreach and Administration. The position was terminated in 2009.
