= St. James Cathedral, Valparaíso =

Coordinates: 33.0462°S 71.6190°W

St. James Cathedral
- Catedral de Santiago
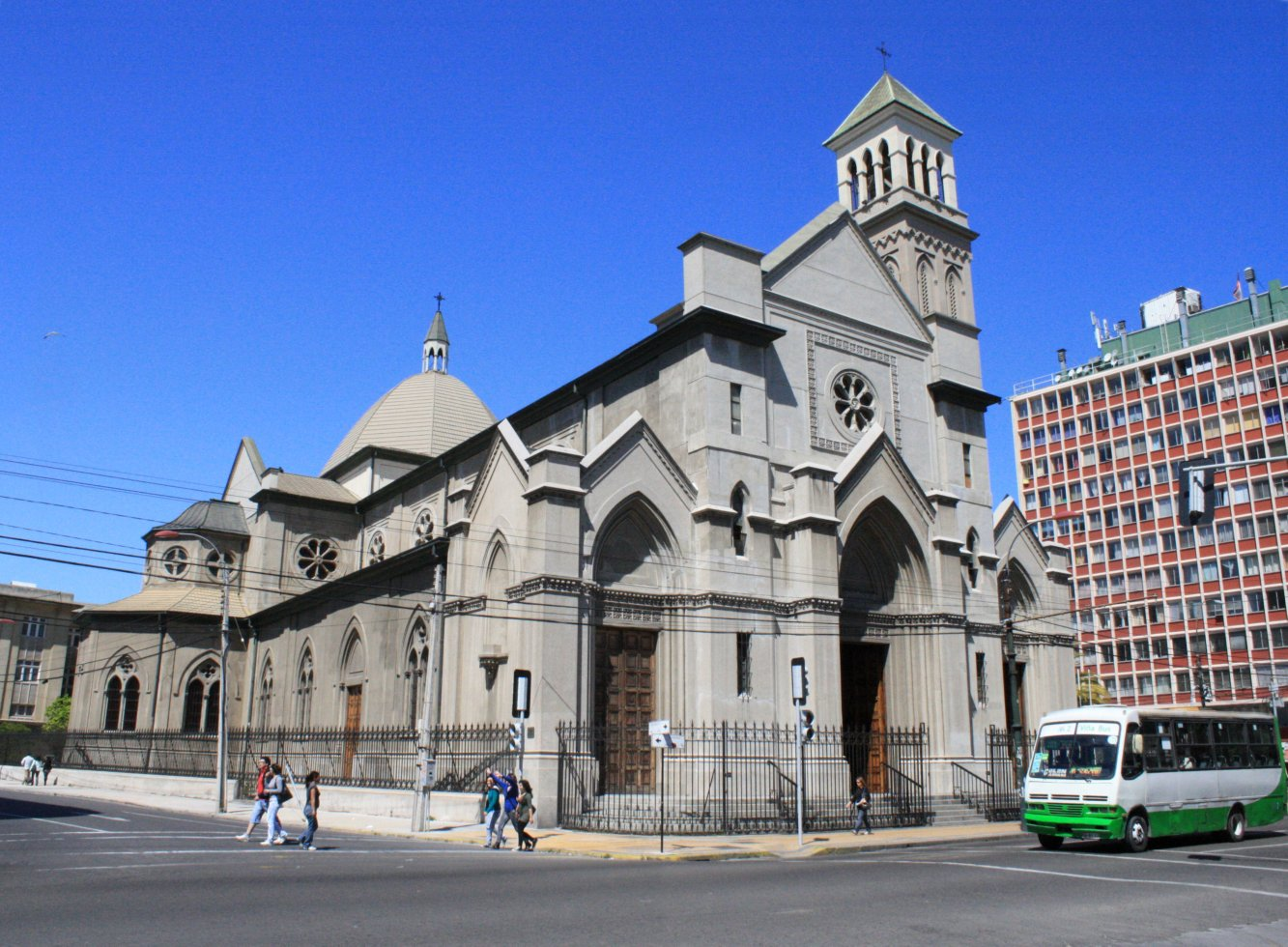
- St. James Cathedral
- Location: Valparaíso
- Country: Chile
- Denomination: Catholic

Architecture
- Architectural type: Church
- Style: Gothic Revival

The Cathedral of St. James (Spanish: Catedral de Santiago en Valparaíso), in Valparaíso, Chile, is the cathedral of the Roman Catholic Diocese of Valparaíso in Chile. Also known simply as Valparaíso Cathedral, the cathedral church is located in the neighborhood of El Almendral neighborhood, on the east side of the Plaza de la Victoria.

Currently, the church also serves as parish church for the Holy Spirit Parish, whose former church also faced the square, though on another site. The wedding of Captain Arturo Prat and Carmela Carvajal had been celebrated at the former church.

The Gothic Revival cathedral church was built from 1910 to 1950 on land donated by Juana Ross Edwards. It was restored after the earthquakes of 1971 and 1985.

== See also ==
- Catholic Church in Chile

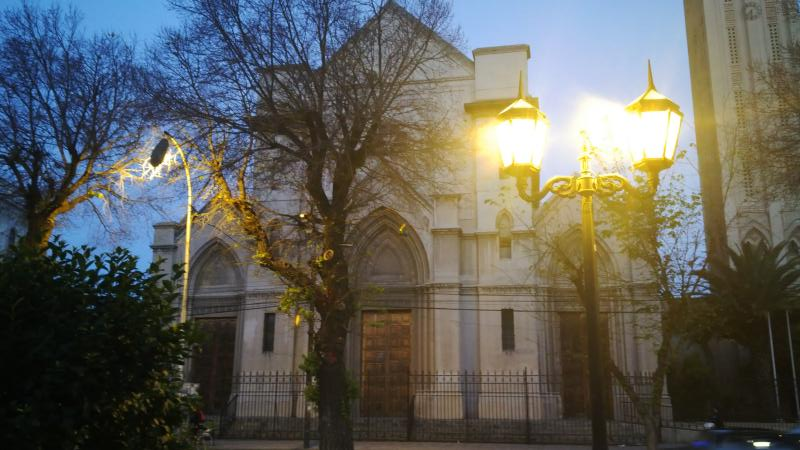
another view
