= Tongue Mountain Range Trails =

Hiking trails in New York, United States

Coordinates: 43.6181°N 73.5866°W

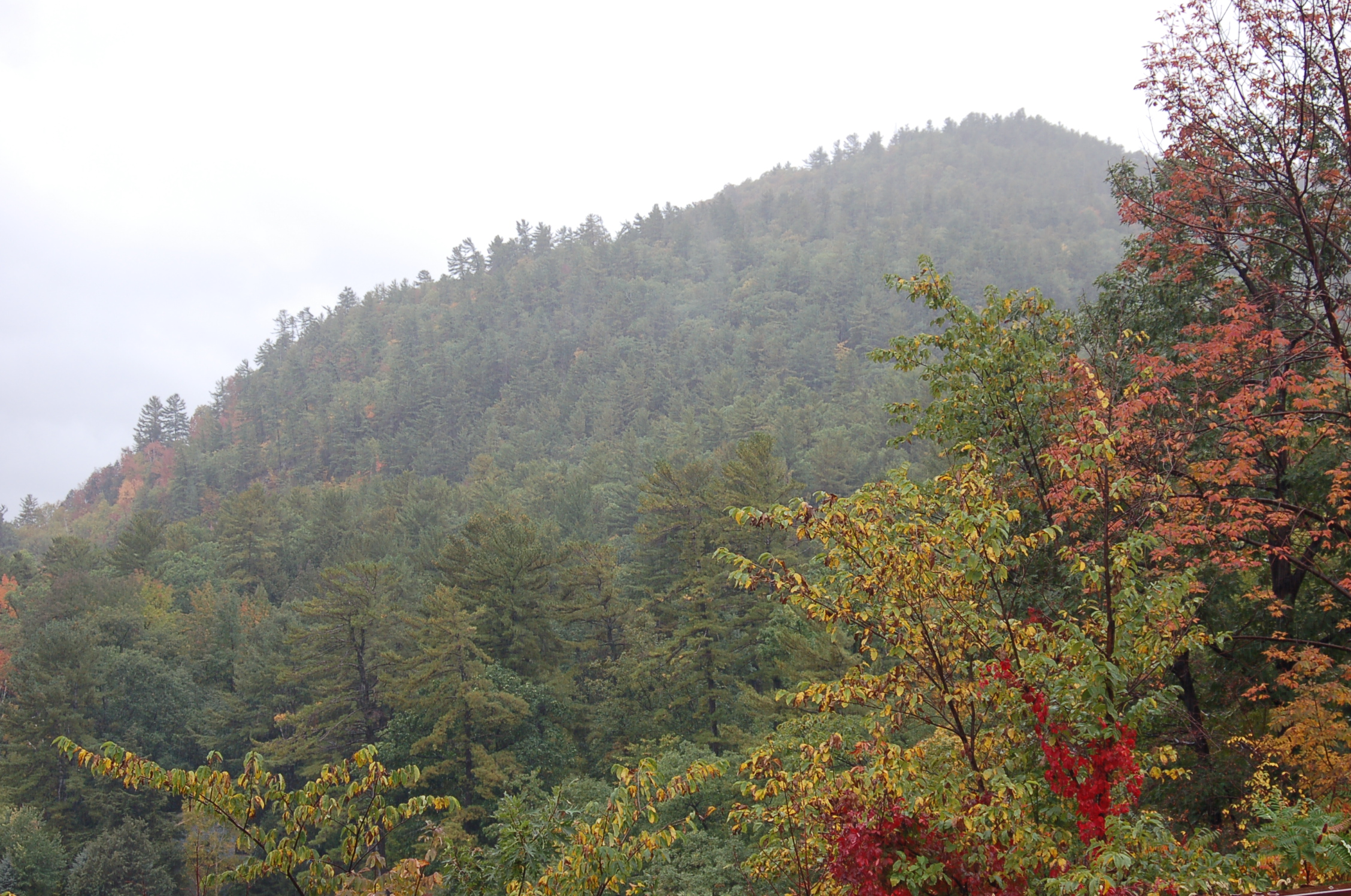
- Five Mile Mountain summit
- Length: 25 mi (40 km)
- Location: Warren County, New York, USA
- Trailheads: Various
- Use: Hiking
- Elevation change: 1,258 ft (383 m)
- Highest point: Five Mile Mountain, 2,258 ft (688 m)
- Difficulty: Easy to strenuous
- Season: Easiest late May to mid-October
- Hazards: Severe weather, timber rattlesnakes

The Tongue Mountain Range Trails are a series of hiking trails located within the Tongue Mountain Range, a subordinate range within the Adirondack Mountains of New York. The trails, 25 miles (40 km) in total length, vary from easy walks along the foot of the mountains on the shore of adjacent Lake George, to more rugged ascents of mountain peaks within the range.

== Trail description ==
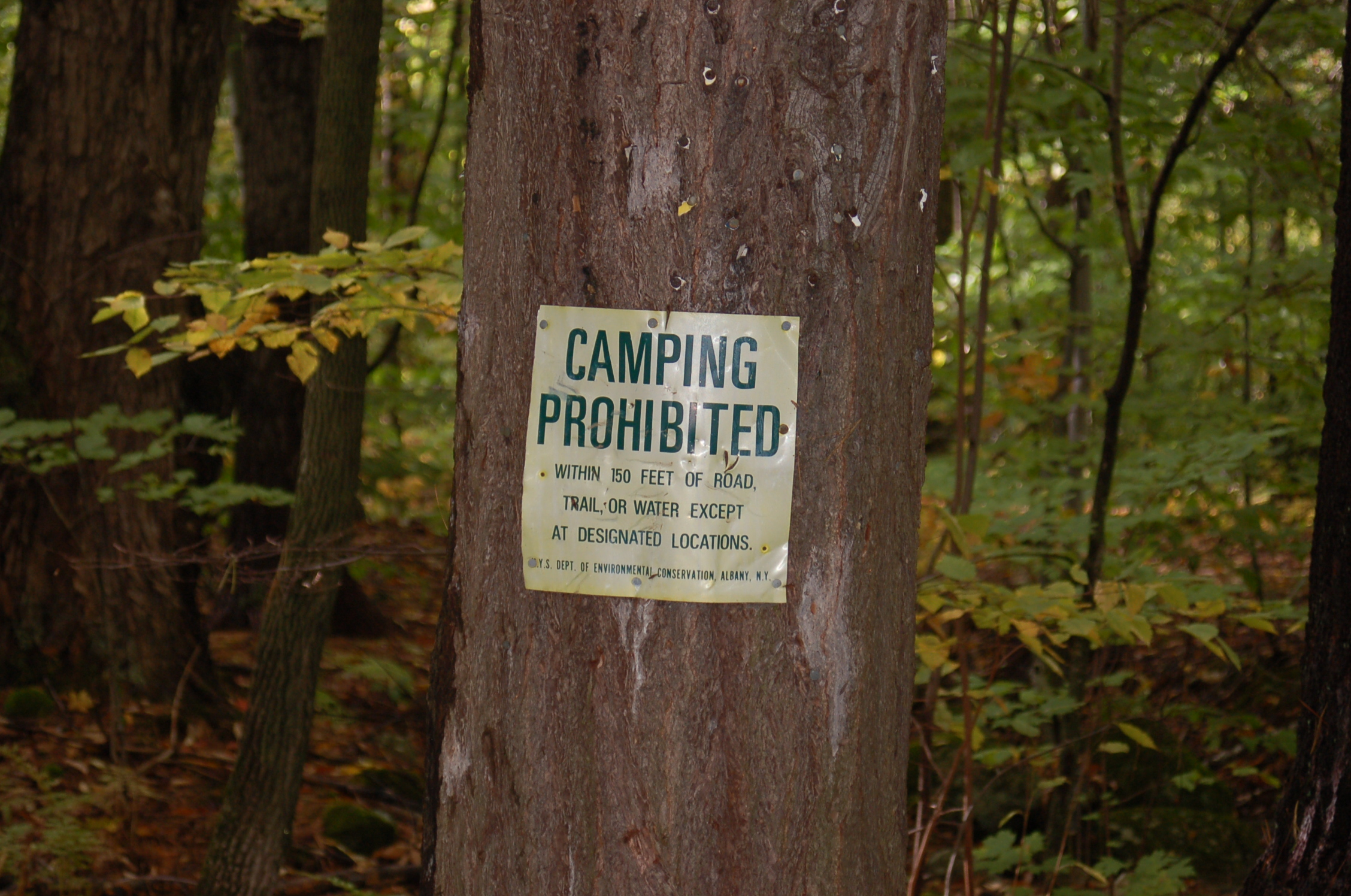
Camping sign on Five Mile Mt

The Tongue Mountain Range consists of six summits along the ridge, First Peak, French Point Peak, Fifth Peak, Five Mile Mountain (highest point in Town of Bolton), Huckleberry Mountain and Brown Mountain. The Five Mile Mountain trail takes in Five Mile Mountain, Huckleberry Mountain and Brown Mountain. There are lean-to’s for overnight camping at Fifth Peak and Brown Mountain. The path passes through wooded and open exposed rock areas. The elevation change on the trail is 1,258 feet (383 m). Other trails run from Clay Meadow to take in the southern half of the range, First Peak, French Point Peak and Fifth Peak.

Trail vistas take in the Adirondack Mountains, Lake Champlain, and the Green Mountains of Vermont. Camping and fires are allowed along the Tongue Range Trails within areas designated by the New York Department of Environmental Conservation. Specific regulations are enforced and Leave No Trace guidelines encouraged. Camping and fires are prohibited above an elevation of 4,000 feet (1,219 m).

== Geology ==
The Tongue Mountain Range is composed of quartz-bearing syenite. It runs 10 miles (16 km) south into Lake George at the southern end of the Narrows Group of lake islands. Tongue Mountain used to be part of the separation between two ancient rivers preceding the modern Lake George.

== Ecosystem ==
The area is a protected wildlife preserve and boasts many species of trees, plants and animals. Dr Patrick L. Cooney of the New York Botany Organisation has listed fifteen species of trees, sixteen fern species, and over sixty species of herbs along the trails. Exposed rocky outcrops along the rock faces are covered with mosses and lichens, and are considered to be fragile habitats. The area is also known for its population of timber rattlesnakes. These are large snakes some approaching 5 feet (1.5 m) in length. They enjoy the shelter in the wooded areas but also enjoy basking in the sun on exposed rocks. Numerous birds inhabit or visit the area including various waterfowl and Peregrine Falcons.

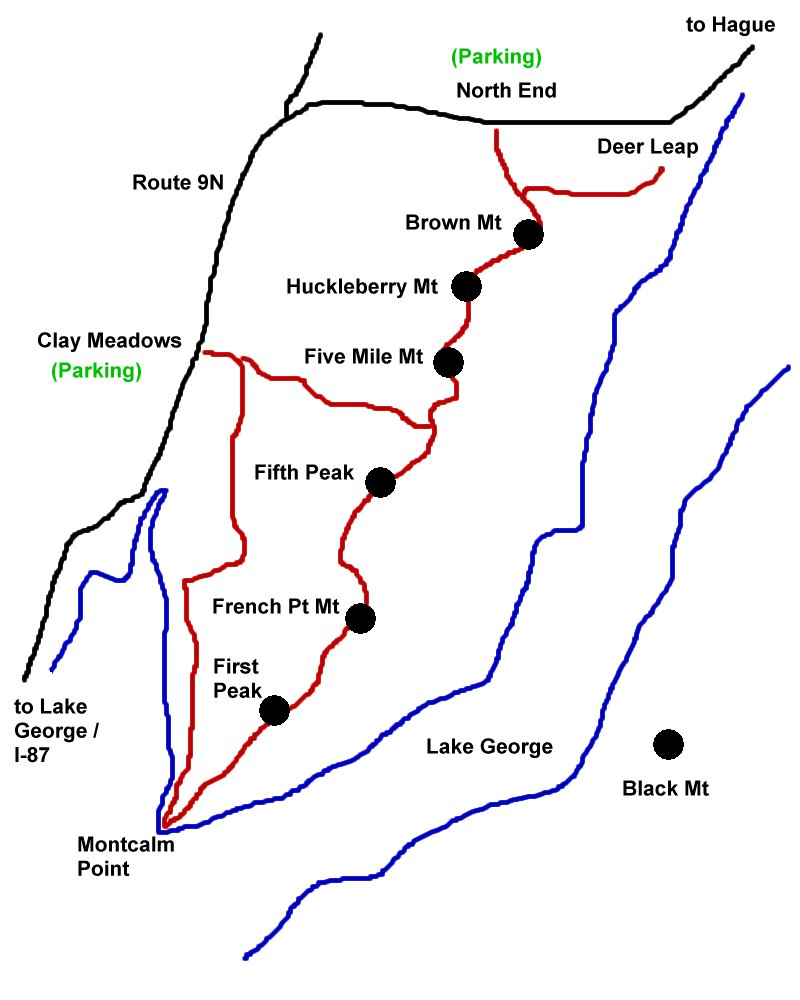
Sketch map of the Tongue Mt range

The Tongue mountains were once a source of commercial timber. During the 19th century, approximately half the forest of the range fell to the logger's ax. As late as 1860, 10,000 softwood logs a year were being floated north to the sawmills at Ticonderoga. Hardwoods from the range went to feed the iron forges on Lake Champlain.

== Gallery ==
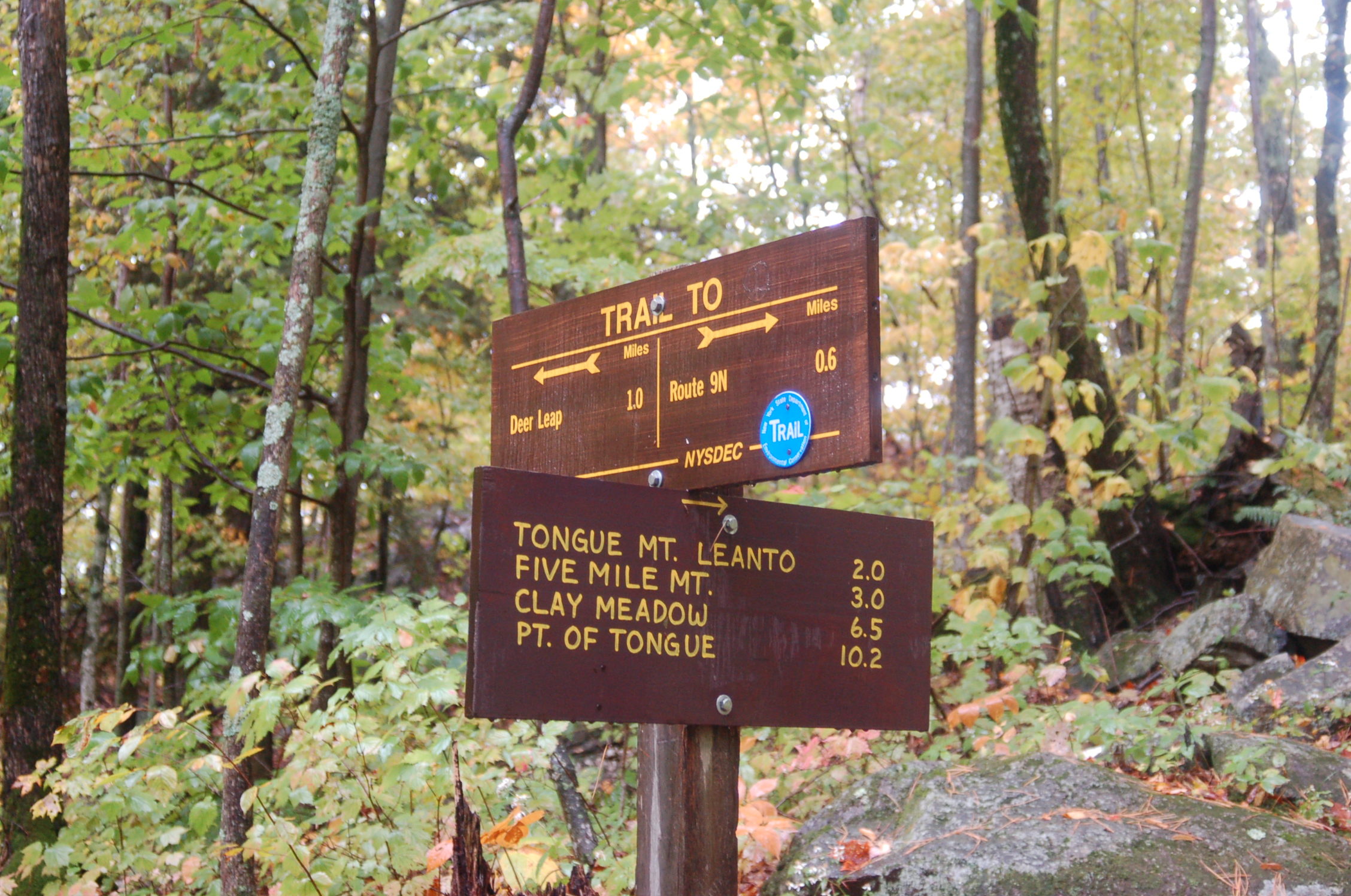
Deer Leap trail split

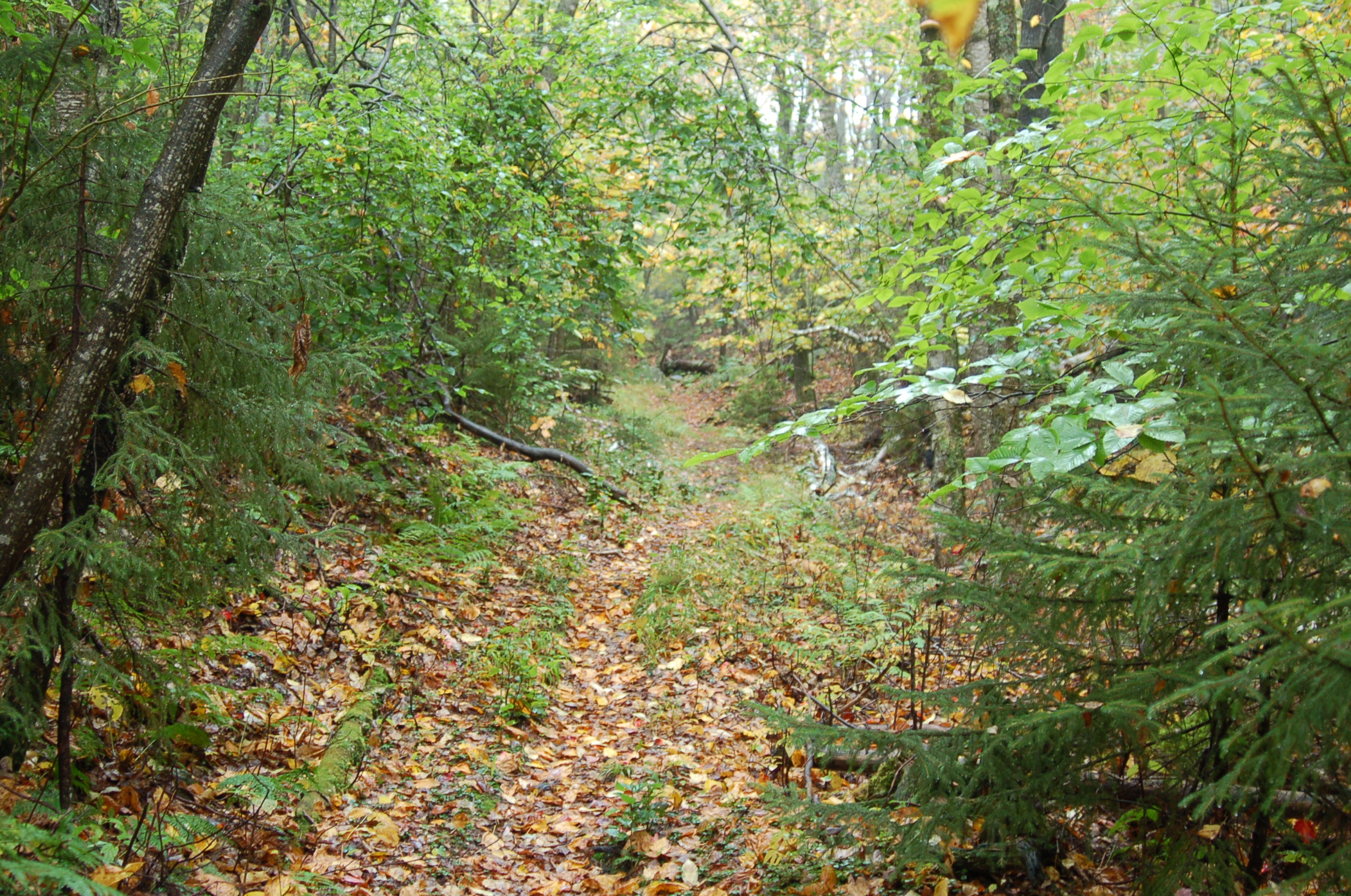
General view of a trail

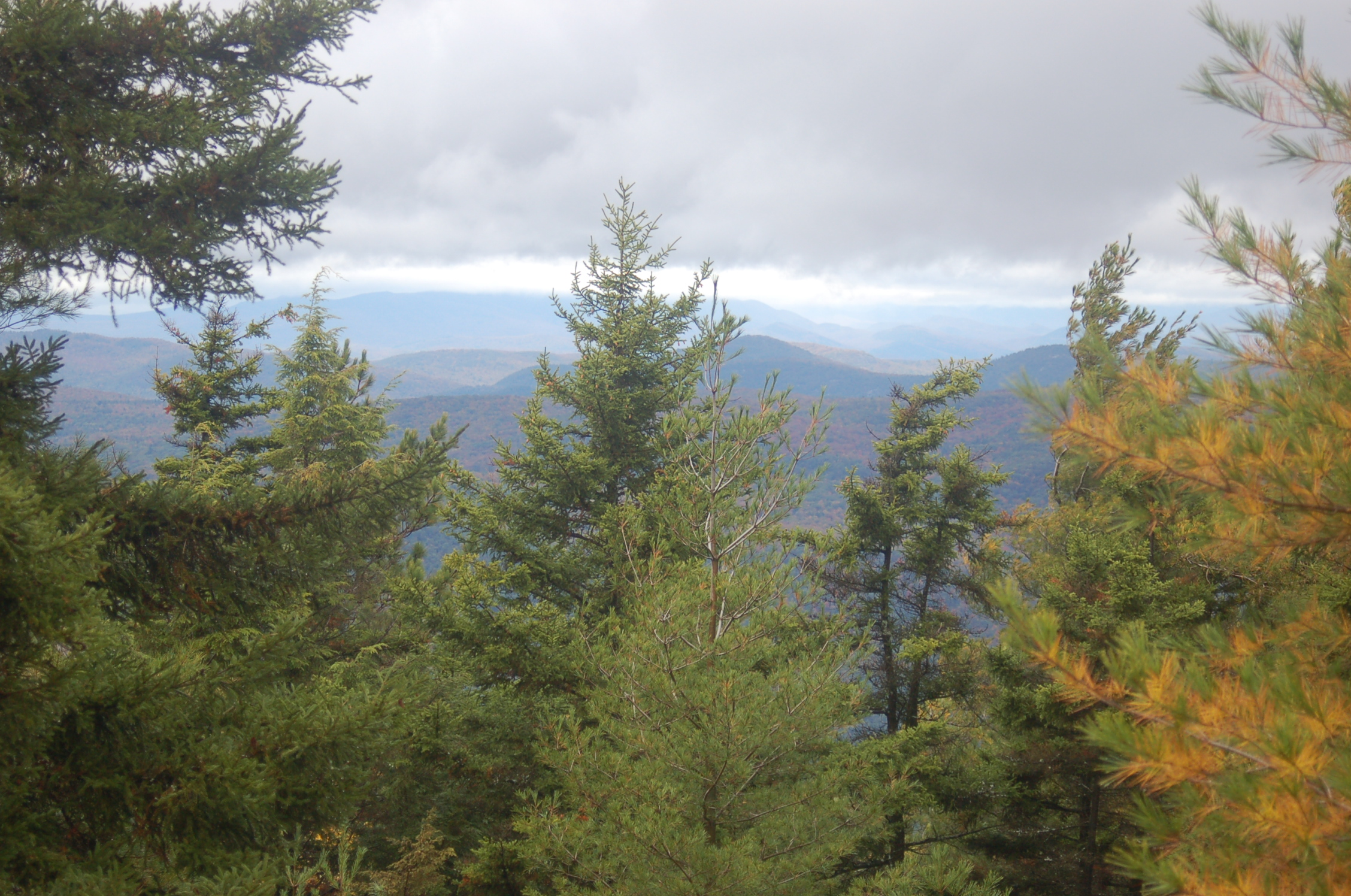
View of the Green Mountains

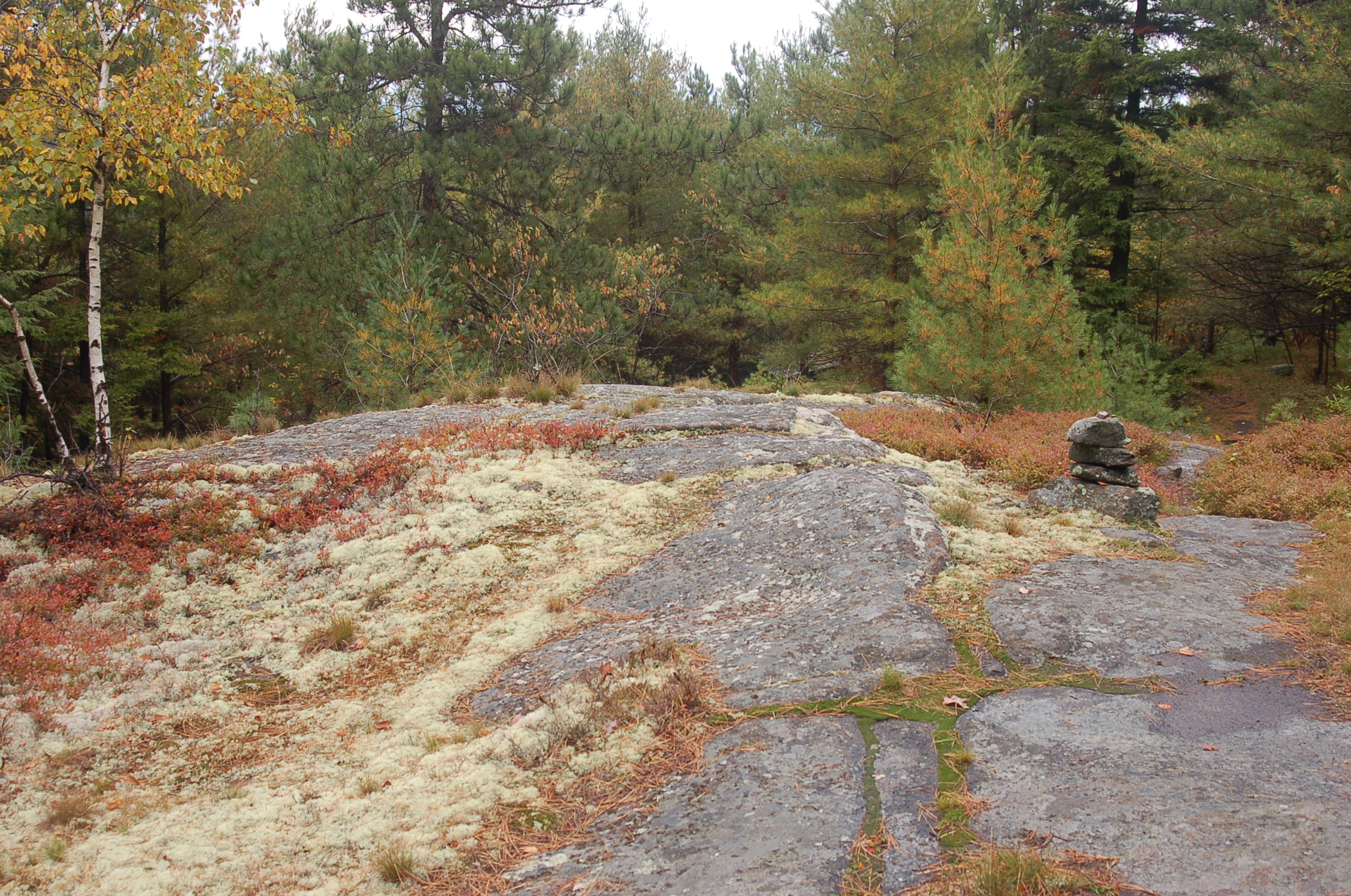
Lichens on Brown Mt

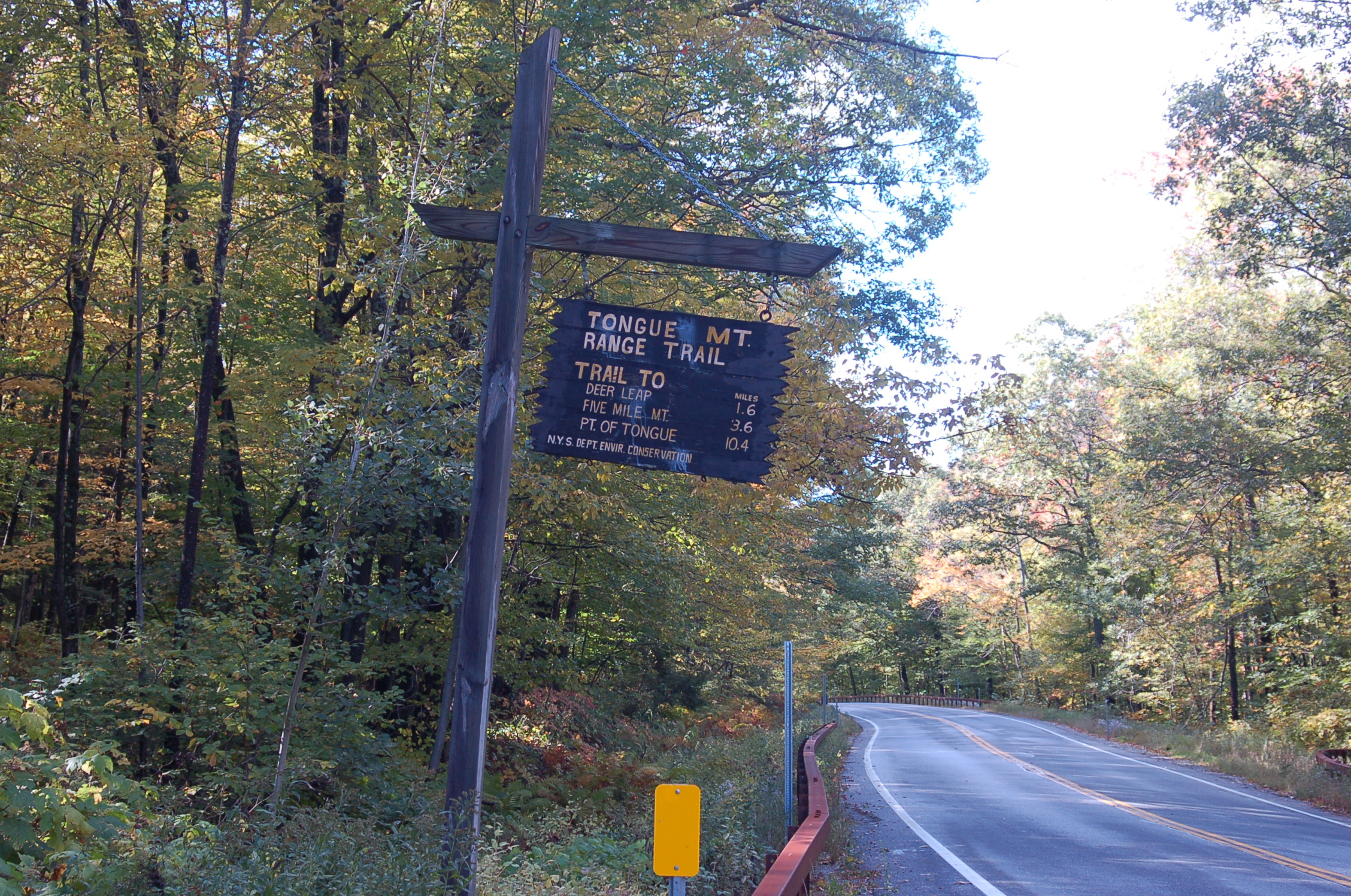
North End trailhead

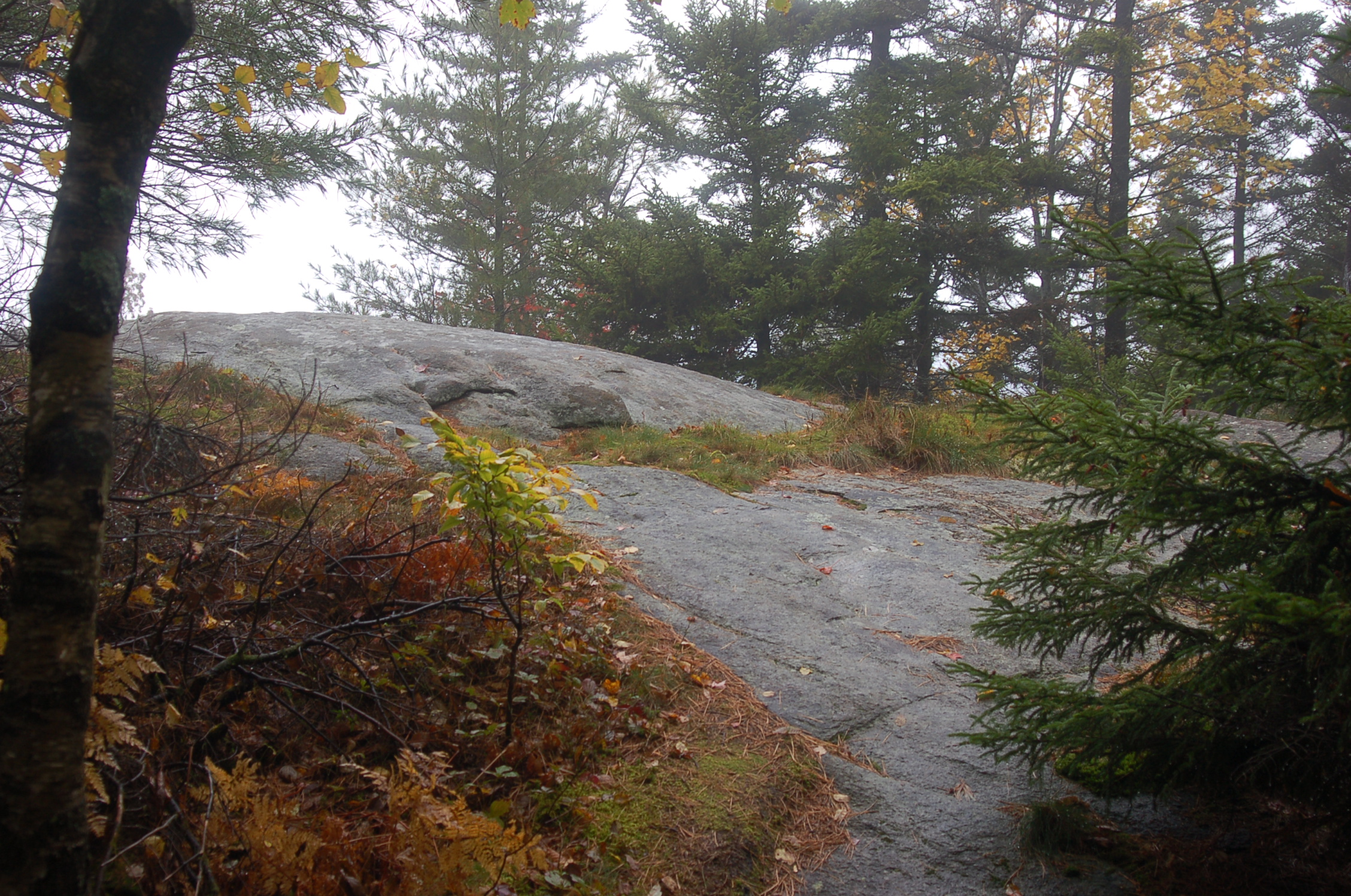
Five Mile Mt summit

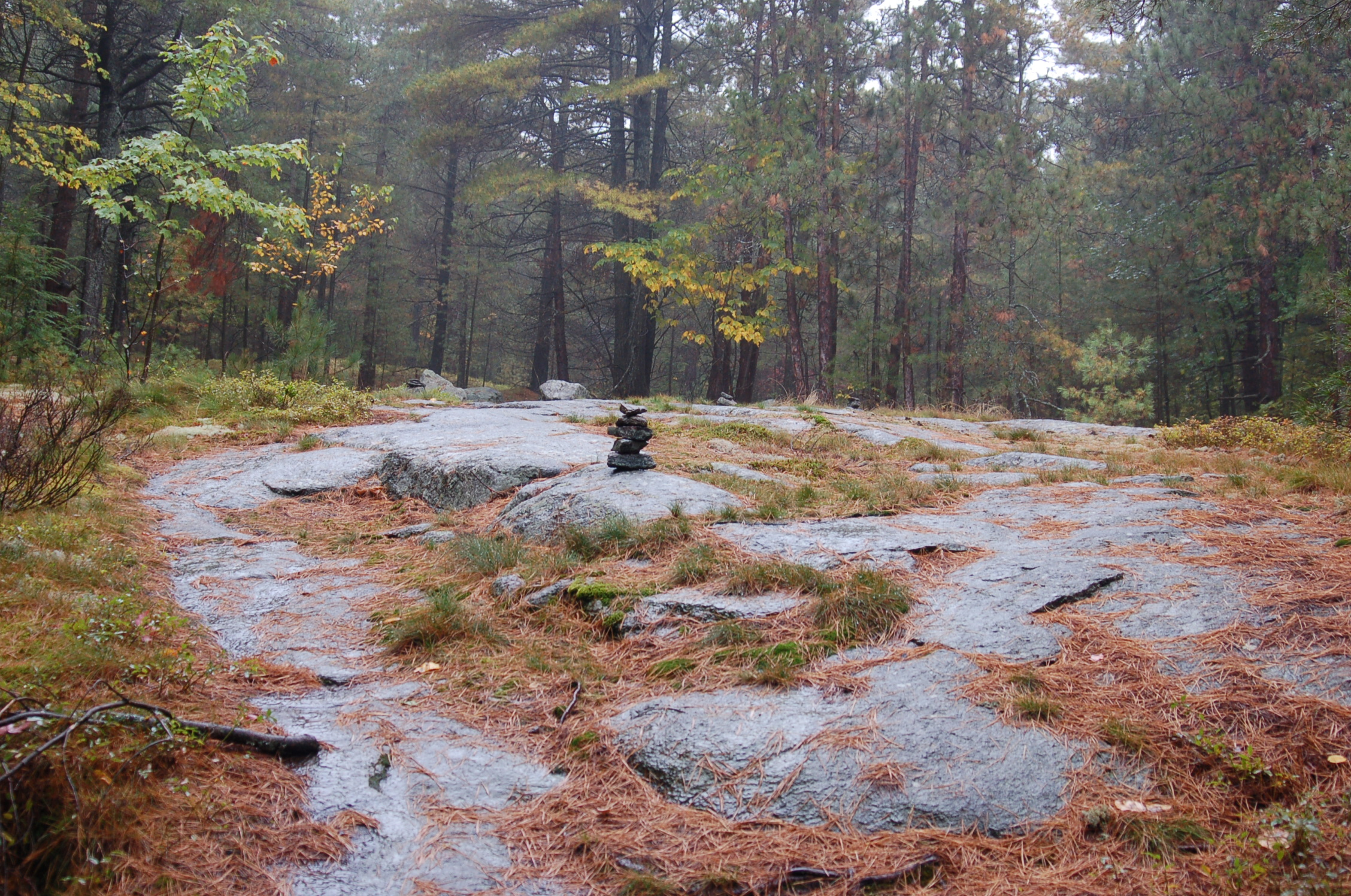
Brown Mt summit

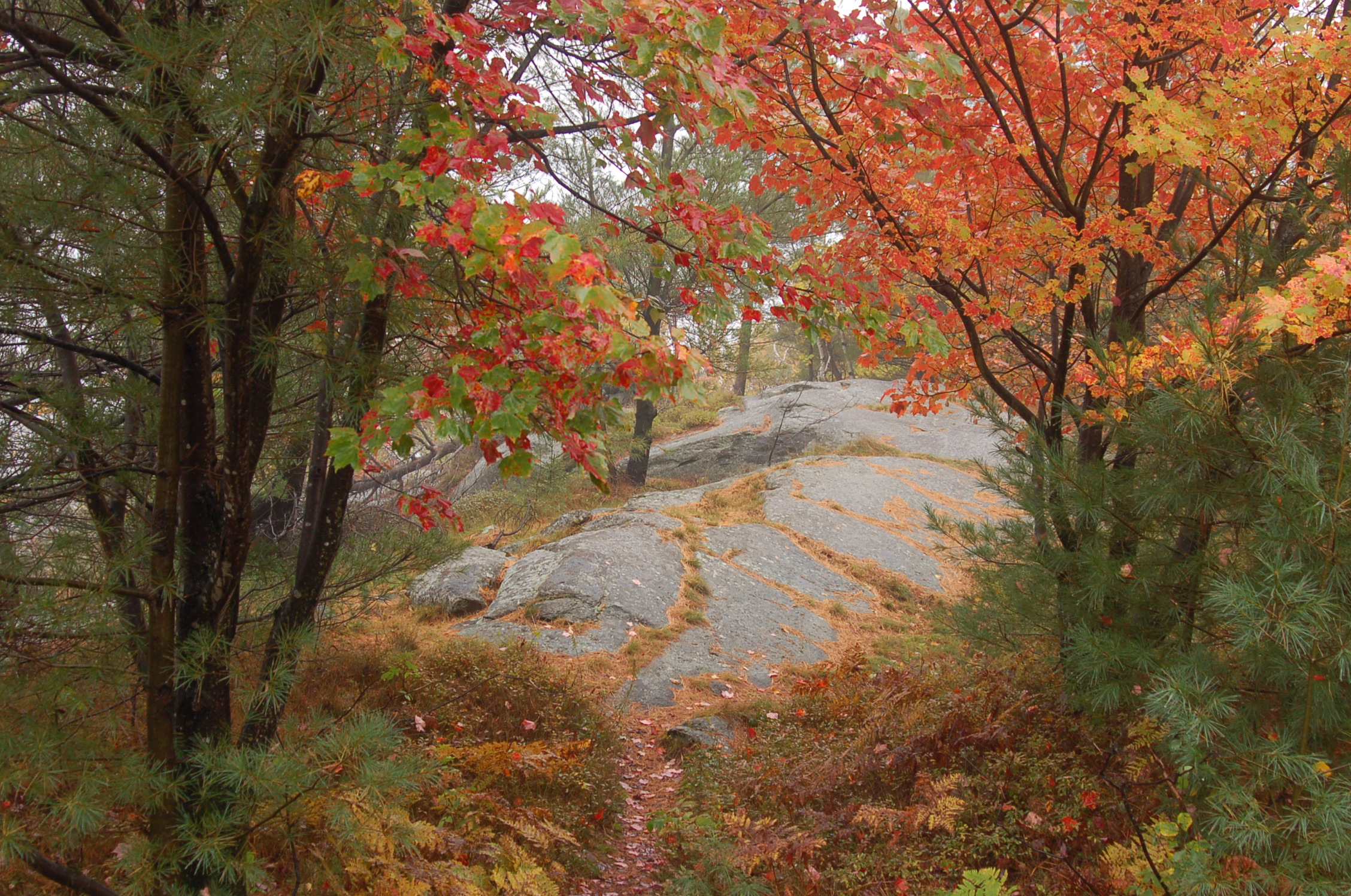
Huckleberry Mt summit

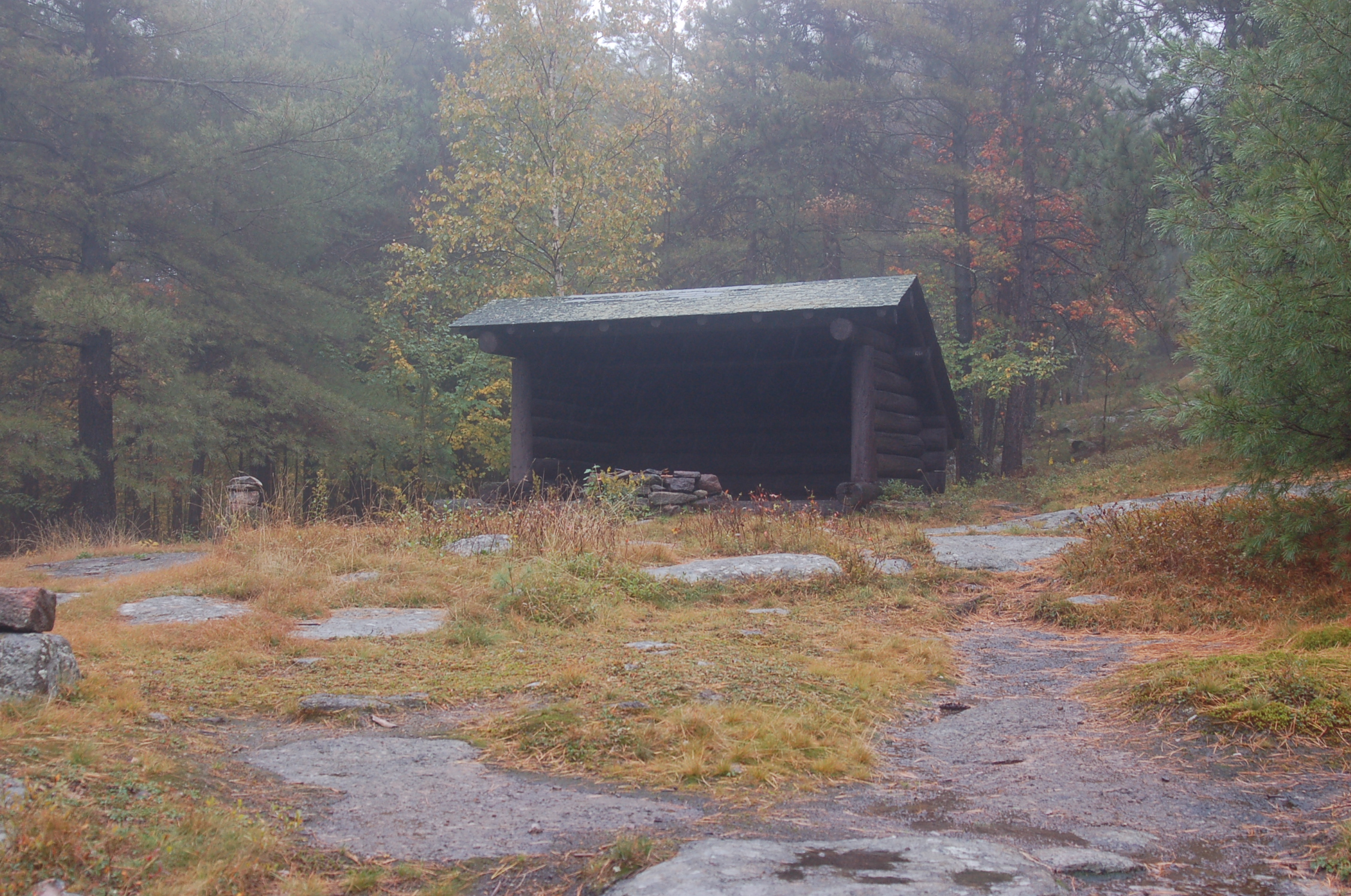
Lean to on Brown Mt

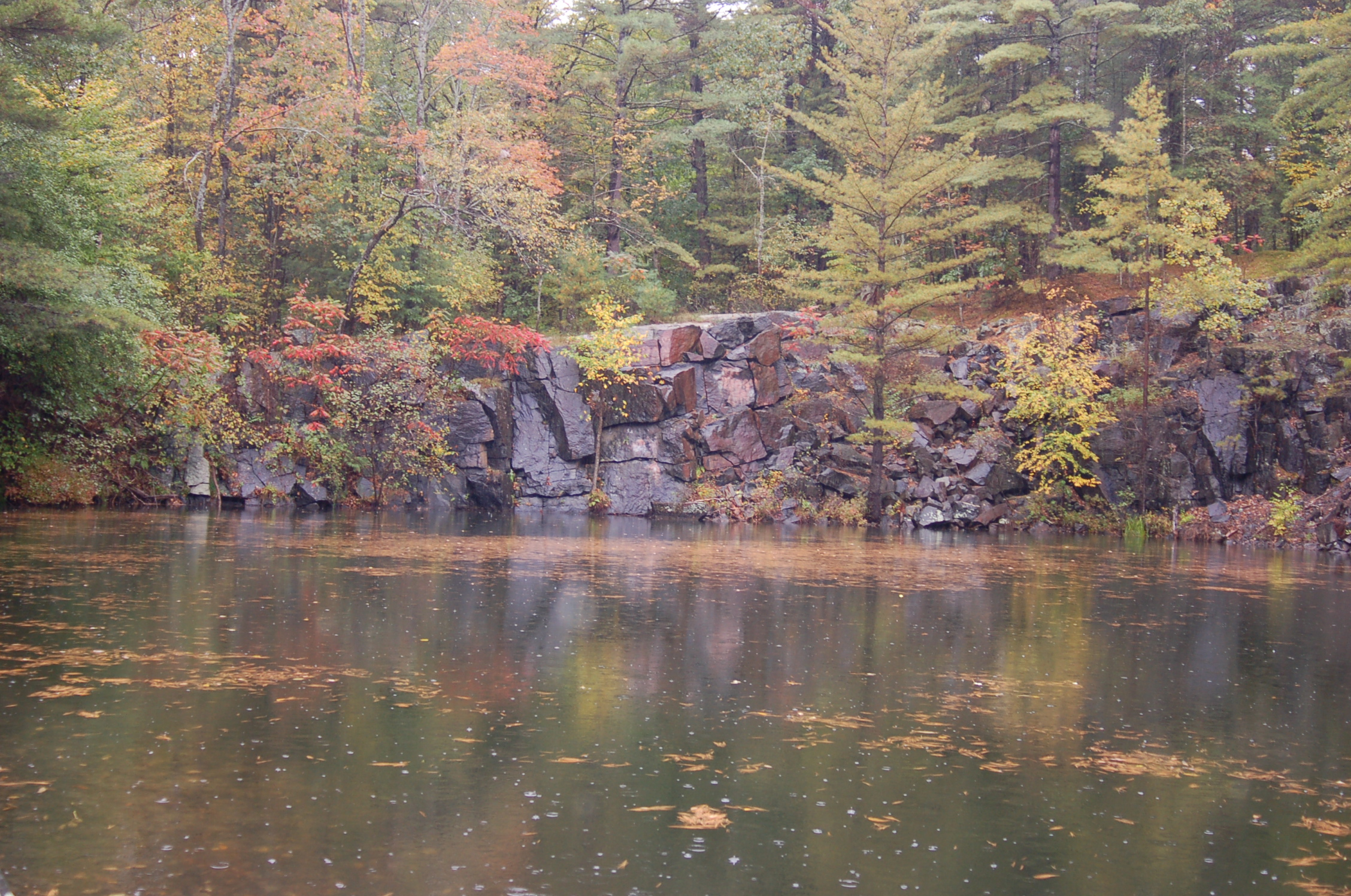
Clay Meadow trailhead
