= La Chute River =

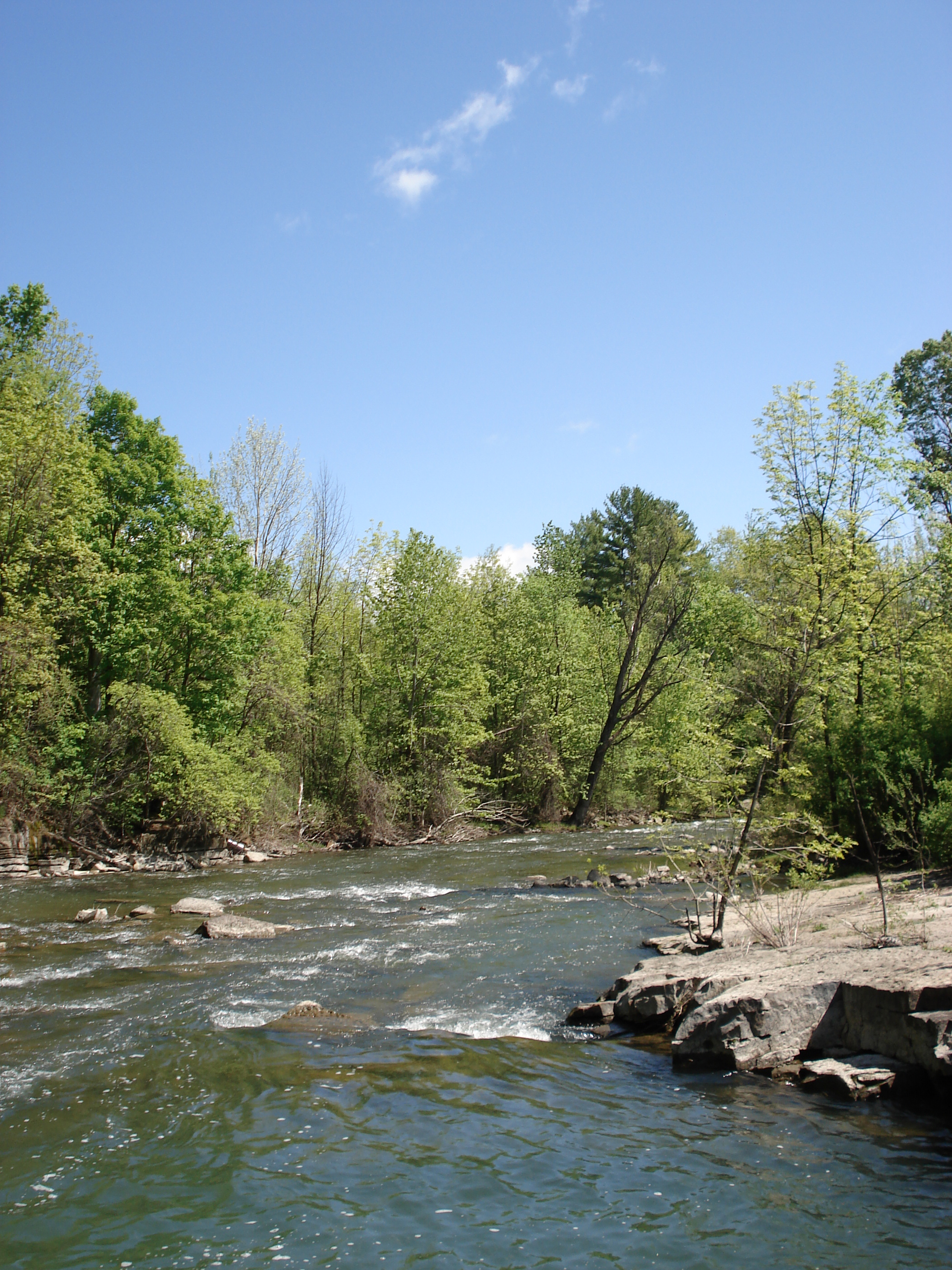
- The river near Ticonderoga, New York

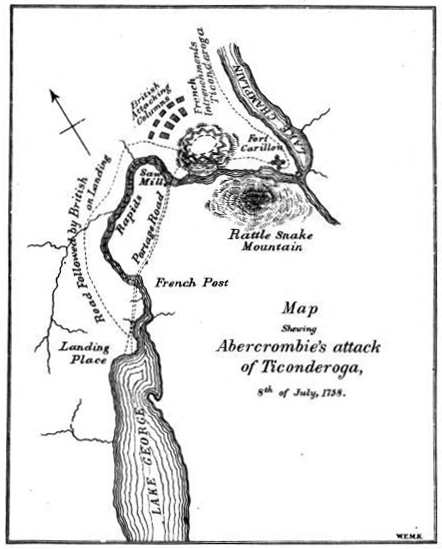
- Fall River Route between Lakes George and Champlain. (1758)

- Location within New York La Chute River (the United States)

Location
- Country: United States
- State: New York
- Region: Adirondacks
- County: Essex
- City: Ticonderoga

Physical characteristics
- Source: Lake George
  - coordinates: 43°50′13″N 73°25′52″W
  - elevation: 318 feet (97 m)
- Mouth: Lake Champlain
  - coordinates: 43°50′10″N 73°23′38″W
  - elevation: 92 feet (28 m)
- Length: 3.7 mi (6 km)

The La Chute River, also known as Ticonderoga Creek, is a short, fast-moving river, near the Vermont–New York border. It is now almost wholly contained within the municipality of Ticonderoga, New York, connecting the northern end and outlet of the 32-mile (51 km) long Lake George and the southern end of the 107-mile (172 km) long Lake Champlain through many falls and rapids. The river drops about 230 feet (70 m) in its three and a half-mile (6 km) course, which is a larger drop than Niagara Falls (167 ft (52 m)).

Part of the Lake Champlain Valley and the St. Lawrence River drainage basin, ultimately its waters flow out of Lake Champlain through the 106 miles (171 km) length of the Richelieu River into the St. Lawrence River and then into the North Atlantic Ocean north of Nova Scotia.

== Geology and physiography ==
The Champlain Valley is among the northernmost valleys considered part of the Great Appalachian Valley, reaching from the province of Quebec, Canada somewhat northeast of Montreal at the outlet of the Richelieu River to Alabama. The Champlain Valley is a physiographic section of the larger Saint Lawrence Valley which in turn is part of the larger Appalachian physiographic division.

Lake Champlain is situated in the Champlain Valley between the Green Mountains of Vermont and the Adirondack Mountains of New York, and Lake George is located in the Adirondack Park and mountain range north of the lower Berkshire Hills arrayed to the south and east, which give land routes through the region accessibility into the Hudson River and Connecticut River drainage basins.

== See also ==
- List of rivers of New York

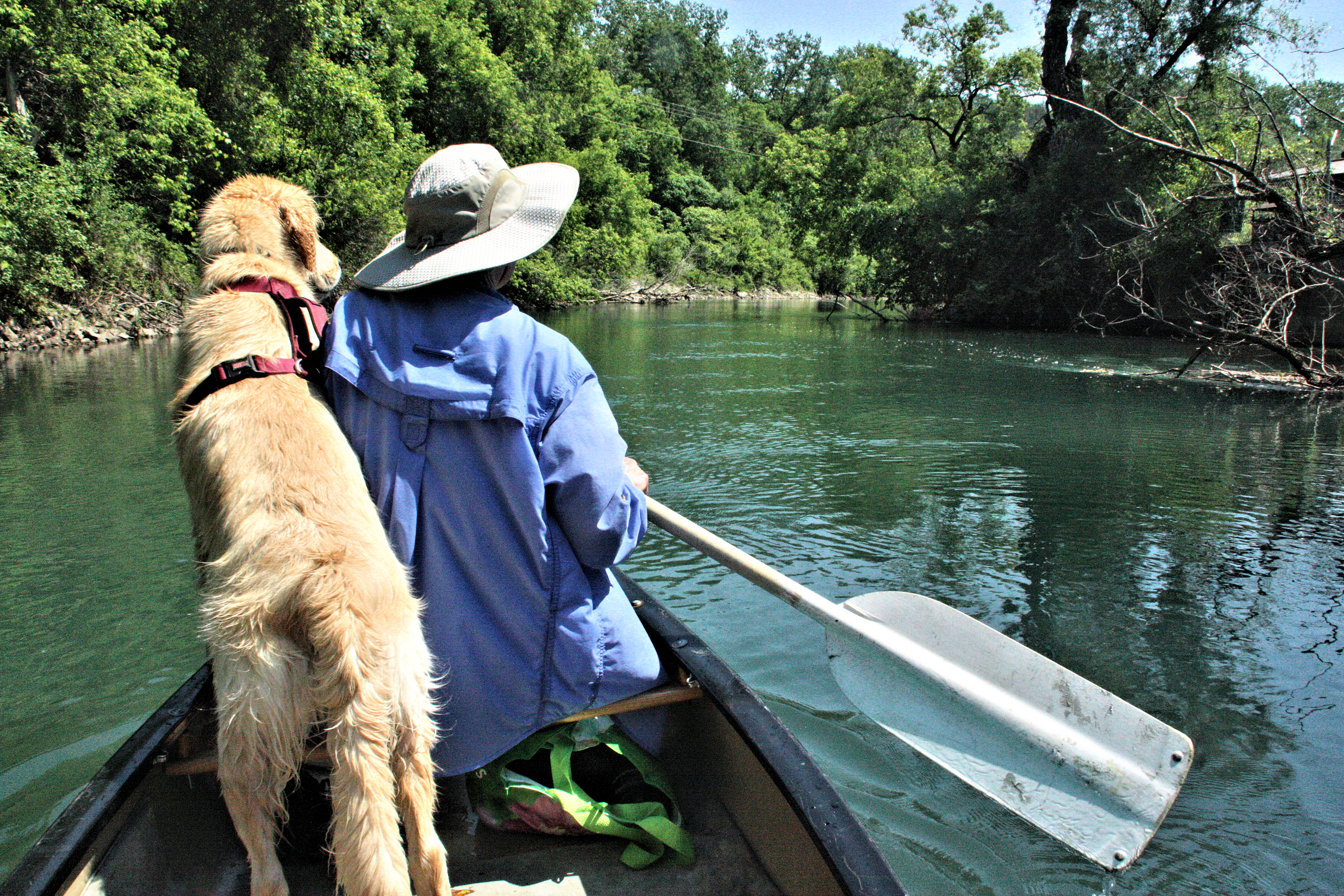
A canoeist on the La Chute River.
