= Huletts Landing, New York =

Huletts Landing
- hamlet
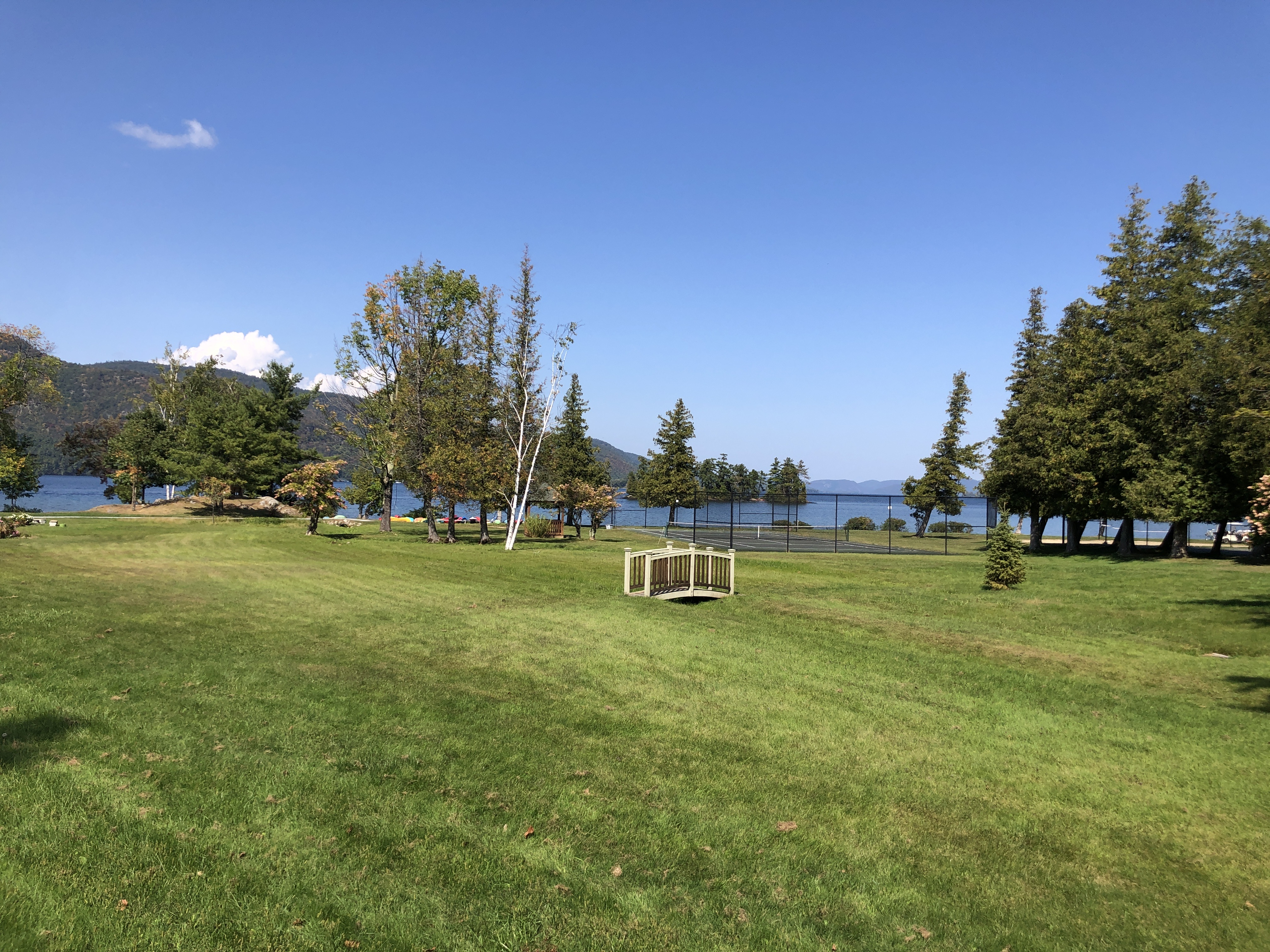
- Village Green in Huletts Landing

- Location within the state of New York
- Coordinates: 43°38′21″N 73°30′25″W
- Country: United States
- State: New York
- County: Washington
- Time zone: UTC-5 (Eastern (EST))
  - Summer (DST): UTC-4 (EDT)
- ZIP code: 12841
- Area code: 518

Huletts Landing is a hamlet in the town of Dresden in northern Washington County, New York, United States. A lakeside community on the eastern shore of Lake George in the Adirondack Mountains, Huletts Landing is located entirely within the Adirondack Park. There is only one roadway access to the hamlet, County Route 6 and its suffixed routes, which head north–south. Huletts Landing is geographically located at 43°38′21″N 73°30′25″W and has approximately two centuries of written history.

The hamlet derives its name from the Hulett family, which resided in the area for several generations after Revolutionary War soldier David Hulett moved near the lakeside and began farming. In 1874 his descendant Philander Hulett built a boat landing, a general store, and a post office. This opened the scenic corner of the lake to steamship traffic and tourism. This suffered a major setback in 1915 when the hamlet's largest hotel burned to its foundation, but tourism remained an important factor to the local economy. The town (Dresden) population, not Huletts Landing, is 695, according to 2007 U.S. Census Bureau estimates.

Huletts seen from Burgess Island in the autumn

== History ==
The Hulett family appears to have been of French origin and came to North America to avoid religious persecution for their Huguenot beliefs. David Hulett, the founder of Huletts Landing, was born in Killingly, Connecticut c. 1758–1762 and served as a private under General James Wadsworth during the American Revolution. For three years, the unit where Pvt. Hulett served fought mainly in upstate New York. Oral history asserts that David Hulett fought heroically at the Battle of Saratoga, where he refused to leave the field despite an injury to his neck. The Hulett family settled near Lake George c. 1804, possibly because of a land grant offered to veterans in lieu of wages for service. Along with Bolton, New York and Putnam, New York, Hulett's Landing is one of three place names on Lake George relating with Wadsworth's Connecticut brigade.

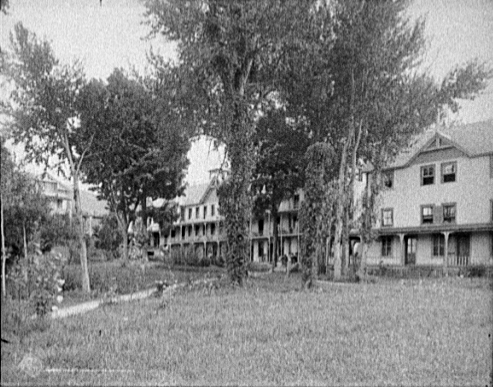
Hulett House hotel, 1907

Until 1874 the Huletts Landing area was known as Bosom Bay. Successive generations of the Hulett family lived by farming the area until Philander Hulett began to develop the area in the 1870s by building a steamship landing and submitting an application to build a post office. The post office application is the earliest document to use the Huletts Landing name. The existing Lake George Steamboat Company, which delivered mail as well as passengers, probably required either a post office or a tourism facility in order to justify adding a new stop to its schedule. An influential travelogue by Rev. William Henry Harrison Murray was published in 1868 and praised the Adirondacks for the relaxing effects of its picturesque wilderness. The first railroad service into the region was also built in the 1870s. The application received approval and Philander Hulett built the post office shortly afterward, housed in the same building as the community's first store. He served as postmaster until his death in 1883, but sold his property.

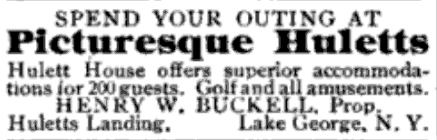
A 1903 travel advertisement for Huletts Landing

According to George T. Kapusinski in his history of the area:

Part of Philander Hulett's property would be sold to businessman John W. Hall, but the bulk of the real estate would pass first to C.W. Wentz, an executive with the Delaware and Hudson Railroad, next to entrepreneur Henry W. Buckell, and finally by the early part of the 20th century to William H. Wyatt, an owner of hotels. All of these successive owners saw their first and primary role as marketing the property as a tourist attraction.

The first Lakeside Inn was constructed for John W. Hall in 1877–1878 on a 1 acre (0.0040 km^{2}) lot. Although the only direct access to Huletts Landing was by ferry, a combination of train, coach, and ferry was normal for Adirondack vacationers of the period. Huletts Hotel grew from expansions on the original farmhouse until a fire destroyed it on 14 November 1915. It was hastily rebuilt for the 1916 tourist season, but questions of arson arose, and led to trial. Tourism has continued to be a mainstay of the community's economy. Adirondack Park was originally established in 1892. In 1931, an eastward expansion brought Lake George and its communities within park boundaries.

== Geography ==
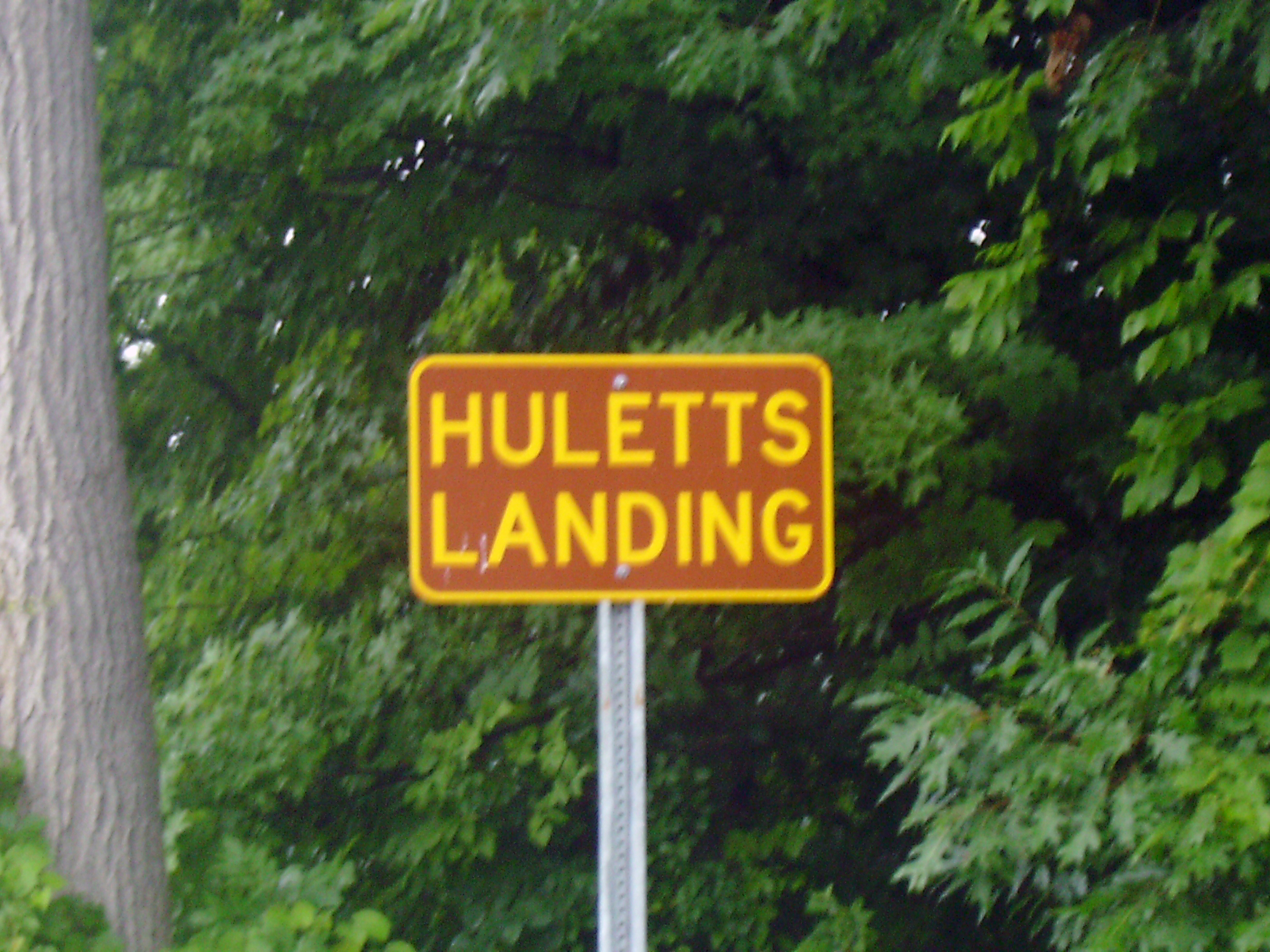
Sign depicting the entrance to Huletts Landing on CR 6

Huletts Landing is located at coordinates 43.38°N 73.30°W. It is located on the northern shore of Lake George, which is a 32-mile (51 km) lake in the Adirondacks. Huletts Landing is entirely situated within the Adirondack Park, which is the largest state park in the United States. Nearly two-thirds of the property within the park's formal range is privately owned with various land use restrictions.

The climate of Huletts Landing is diverse. On average, the coolest month is January, while the warmest is July. The highest monthly precipitation in the area, on average, occurs in August. The lowest recorded temperature was −38 °F (−39 °C) in 1979, while the highest was 103 °F (39 °C) in 1953.

== Transportation ==
Huletts Landing is a remote hamlet, accessible by car only via Washington County Route 6, which branches off of nearby New York State Route 22. The main road is known as Huletts Landing Road, and spawns two suffixed routes which reach different parts of Huletts Landing. The first is County Route 6A, which is better known as Lands End Road, heads southward while the other, County Route 6B, which is better known as Bluff Head Road, brings the traveler northward, to locations such as Washington County Park and Huletts Landing Marina. Huletts Landing County Park is also on CR 6B.

The airport at Burlington, Vermont is approximately a one-hour drive from the eastern section of Adirondack Park, where Huletts Landing is located. A smaller airport within Adirondack Park is Adirondack Regional Airport in Saranac Lake.

== Tourism ==
The area sees most of its tourism during the summer and the fall foliage season, virtually shutting down in winter. Nearby attractions include lake cruises, canoeing, golf, and hiking. Historic attractions of Huletts Landing also included hunting and local proprietors of the late nineteenth and early twentieth centuries provided weekly fireworks displays during tourist season.
