= 1912–13 United States Senate elections =

- January 16, 1912 – January 29, 1913
- Class 2

32 of the 96 seats in the United States Senate 49 seats needed for a majority
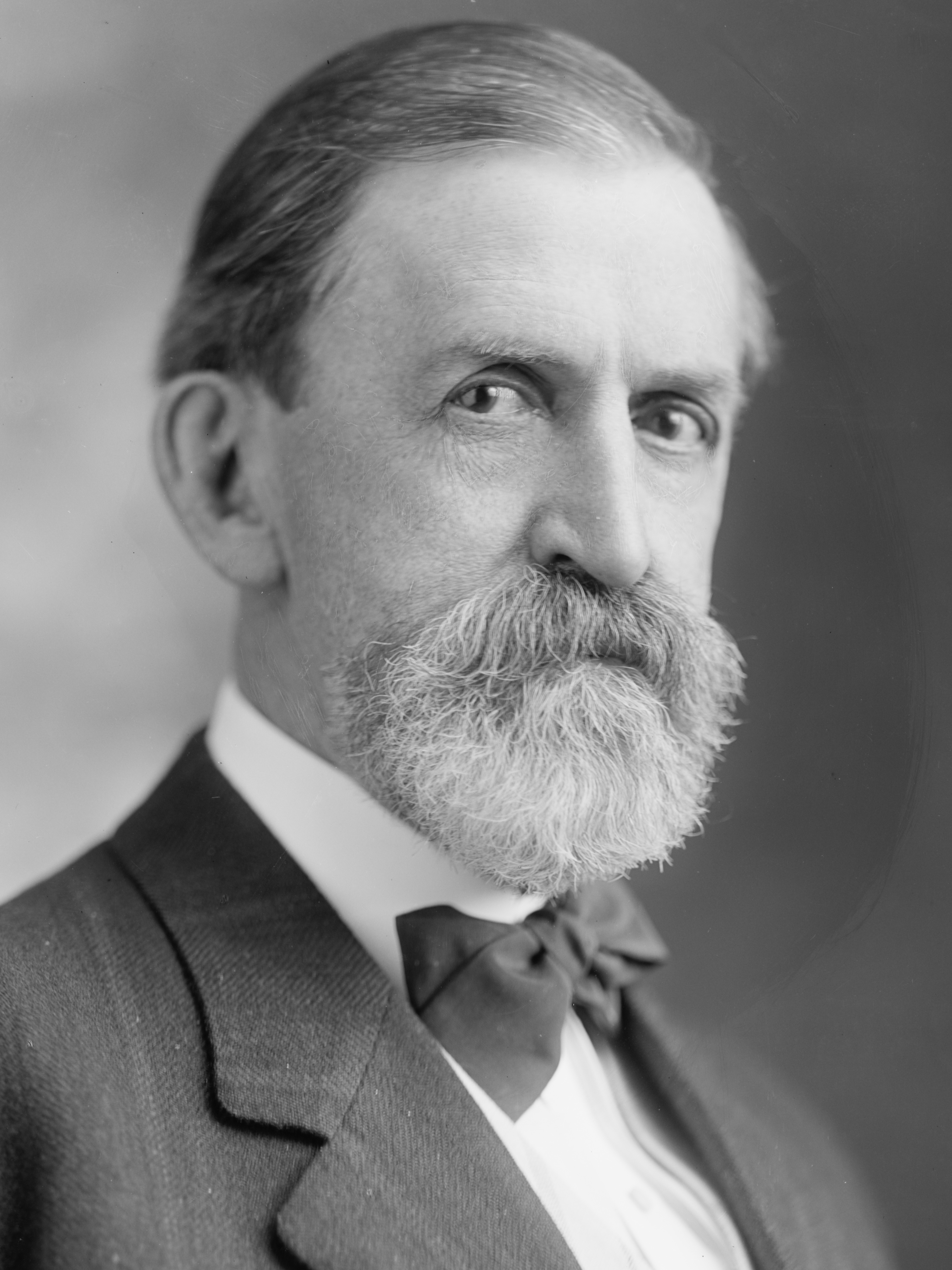

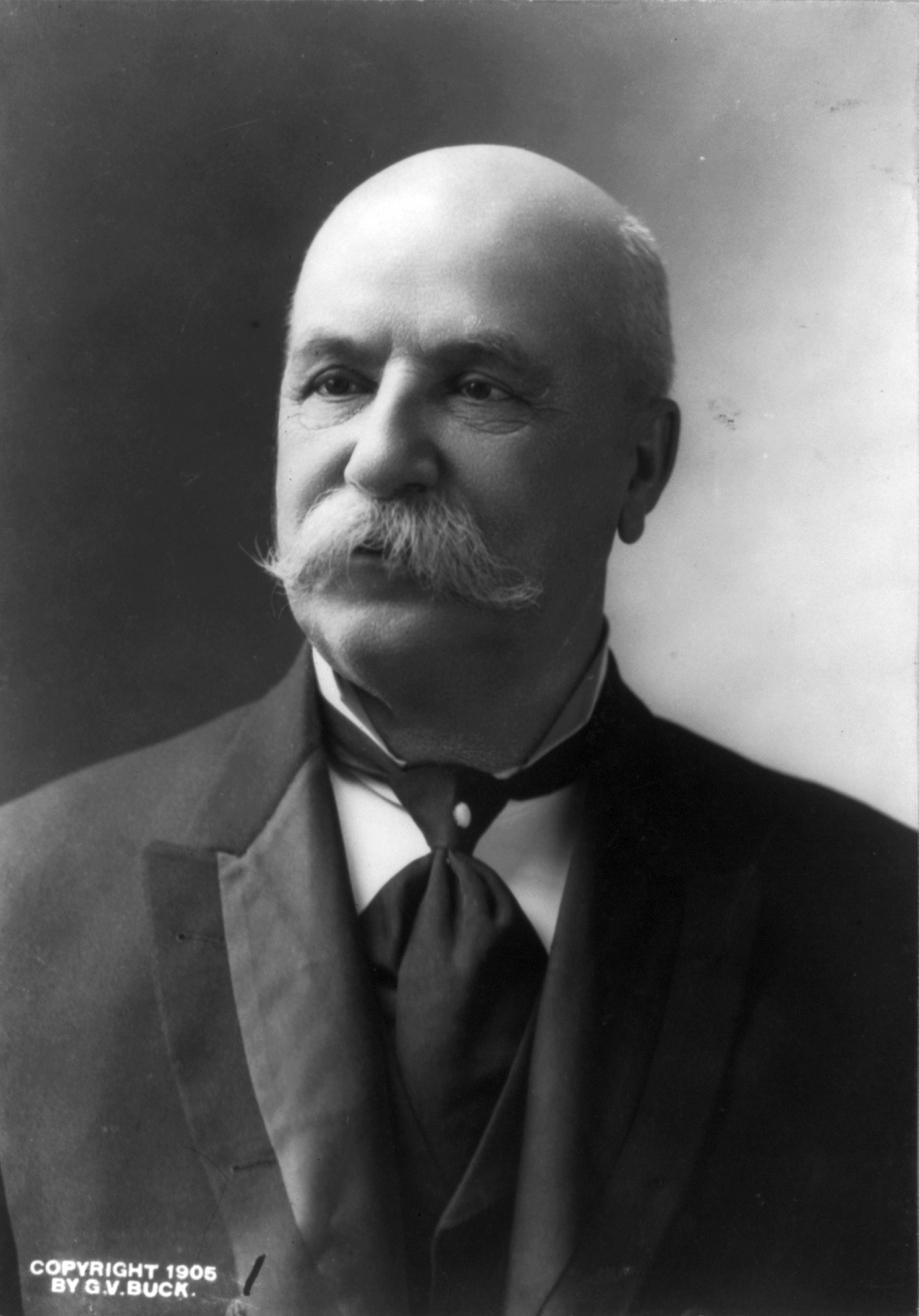
| | Majority party | Minority party |
|---|---|---|
| Leader | John W. Kern (Note: as Democratic Conference Chairman) | Jacob H. Gallinger (Note: as Republican Conference Chairman) |
| Party | Democratic | Republican |
| Leader since | March 4, 1911 | March 4, 1911 |
| Leader's seat | Indiana | New Hampshire |
| Seats before | 43 | 52 |
| Seats after | 47 | 45 |
| Seat change | ▲4 | ▼7 |
| Seats up | 13 | 19 |
| Seats won | 17 | 12 |
- Results of the elections: Democratic gain Democratic hold Republican gain Republican hold No election
Majority conference chairman before election
Shelby Moore Cullom
Republican
Elected Majority conference chairman
John W. Kern
Democratic

The 1912–13 United States Senate elections were held on various dates in various states. They were the last U.S. Senate elections before the ratification of the Seventeenth Amendment in 1913, establishing direct elections for all Senate seats. Senators had been primarily chosen by state legislatures. Senators were elected over a wide range of time throughout 1912 and 1913, and a seat may have been filled months late or remained vacant due to legislative deadlock. Some states elected their senators directly even before passage of the Seventeenth Amendment. Oregon pioneered direct election and experimented with different measures over several years until it succeeded in 1907. Soon after, Nebraska followed suit and laid the foundation for other states to adopt measures reflecting the people's will. By 1912, as many as 29 states elected senators either as nominees of their party's primary or in conjunction with a general election.

In these elections, terms were up for the senators in Class 2. The Democrats gained control of the Senate for the first time in 20 years. Of the 32 seats up for election, 17 were won by Democrats, thereby gaining four seats from the Republicans. Two seats were unfilled by state legislators who failed to elect a new senator on time.

These elections coincided with Democrat Woodrow Wilson's victory in the presidential election amid a divide in the Republican Party. In the Senate, Joseph M. Dixon and Miles Poindexter defected from the Republican Party and joined Theodore Roosevelt's new Progressive Party. Dixon, however, lost his seat during this election.

== Results summary ==
The Senate after the elections in 1912

| Parties | Total seats | | | | | | | | |
| Parties | Incumbents | This election | | | | | | Result | +/- |
| Parties | Incumbents | Not up | Up | Re- elected | Held | Gained | Lost | Result | +/- |
|---|---|---|---|---|---|---|---|---|---|
| Democratic | 43 | 30 | 13 | 5 | 5 | ▲7 | ▼2 | 47 | ▲4 |
| Republican | 52 | 33 | 19 | 6 | 4 | ▲2 | ▼7 | 45 | ▼7 |
| Others | 0 | 0 | 0 | 0 | 0 | Steady | Steady | 0 | Steady |
| Vacant | 1 | 1 | 0 | Steady | Steady | ▲3 | Steady | 4 | ▲3 |
| Total | 96 | 64 | 32 | 11 | 9 | ▲12 | ▼9 | 96 | ▼3 |

== Change in composition ==
=== Before the elections ===
| | | D_{1} | D_{2} | D_{3} | D_{4} | D_{5} | D_{6} | D_{7} | D_{8} |
| D_{18} | D_{17} | D_{16} | D_{15} | D_{14} | D_{13} | D_{12} | D_{11} | D_{10} | D_{9} |
| D_{19} | D_{20} | D_{21} | D_{22} | D_{23} | D_{24} | D_{25} | D_{26} | D_{27} Ala. Ran | D_{28} Ariz. New seat |
| D_{38} S.C. Ran | D_{37} Okla. Ran | D_{36} N.C. Ran | D_{35} Miss. Ran | D_{34} Maine (sp); Maine (reg); Ran | D_{33} La. Ran | D_{32} Ky. Retired | D_{31} Ga. Ran | D_{30} Ark. Retired | D_{29} Ariz. New seat |
| D_{39} Tex. Retired | D_{40} Va. (reg); Ran | D_{41} Va. (sp); Ran | D_{42} W.Va. Ran | V_{1} Colo. (sp); Died | V_{2} Ill. (sp) | R_{52} Wyo. Ran | R_{51} Tenn. Retired | R_{50} S.D. Ran | R_{49} R.I. Retired |
| Majority → | | | | | | | | | R_{49} R.I. Retired |
| R_{39} Mass. Retired | R_{40} Mich. Ran | R_{41} Minn. Ran | R_{42} Mont. Ran | R_{43} Neb. Ran | R_{44} N.H. Retired | R_{45} N.J. Ran | R_{46} N.M. (1st); New seat | R_{47} N.M. (1st); New seat N.M. (reg); Ran | R_{48} Ore. Ran |
| R_{38} Kan. Ran | R_{37} Iowa; Ran | R_{36} Ill. Ran | R_{35} Idaho; Ran | R_{34} Del. Retired | R_{33} Colo. Retired | R_{32} | R_{31} | R_{30} | R_{29} |
| R_{19} | R_{20} | R_{21} | R_{22} | R_{23} | R_{24} | R_{25} | R_{26} | R_{27} | R_{28} |
| R_{18} | R_{17} | R_{16} | R_{15} | R_{14} | R_{13} | R_{12} | R_{11} | R_{10} | R_{9} |
| | | R_{1} | R_{2} | R_{3} | R_{4} | R_{5} | R_{6} | R_{7} | R_{8} |

=== Results of elections before the next Congress ===
| | | D_{1} | D_{2} | D_{3} | D_{4} | D_{5} | D_{6} | D_{7} | D_{8} |
| D_{18} | D_{17} | D_{16} | D_{15} | D_{14} | D_{13} | D_{12} | D_{11} | D_{10} | D_{9} |
| D_{19} | D_{20} | D_{21} | D_{22} | D_{23} | D_{24} | D_{25} | D_{26} | D_{27} Ala. Re-elected | D_{28} Ariz. Gain |
| D_{38} Mont. Gain | D_{37} Miss. Hold | D_{36} La. Hold | D_{35} Ky. Hold | D_{34} Kan. Gain | D_{33} Del. Gain | D_{32} Colo. (sp); Gain | D_{31} Colo. Gain | D_{30} Ark. Hold | D_{29} Ariz. Gain |
| D_{39} N.J. Gain | D_{40} N.C. Re-elected | D_{41} Okla. Re-elected | D_{42} Ore. Gain | D_{43} S.C. Re-elected | D_{44} Tenn. Gain | D_{45} Tex. Hold | D_{46} Va. (reg); Re-elected | D_{47} Va. (sp); Elected (Note: Appointee elected) | V_{1} Ga. D Loss |
Majority ↑
| R_{39} Neb. Hold | R_{40} N.M. (1st); Gain | R_{41} N.M. (1st); Gain N.M. (reg); Re-elected | R_{42} R.I. Hold | R_{43} S.D. Hold | R_{44} W.Va. Gain | R_{45} Wyo. Re-elected | V_{4} N.H. R Loss | V_{3} Ill. (reg); R Loss | V_{2} Ill. (sp) |
| R_{38} Minn. Re-elected | R_{37} Mich. Re-elected | R_{36} Mass. Hold | R_{35} Maine (sp); Elected Maine (reg); Gain | R_{34} Iowa; Re-elected | R_{33} Idaho; Re-elected | R_{32} | R_{31} | R_{30} | R_{29} |
| R_{19} | R_{20} | R_{21} | R_{22} | R_{23} | R_{24} | R_{25} | R_{26} | R_{27} | R_{28} |
| R_{18} | R_{17} | R_{16} | R_{15} | R_{14} | R_{13} | R_{12} | R_{11} | R_{10} | R_{9} |
| | | R_{1} | R_{2} | R_{3} | R_{4} | R_{5} | R_{6} | R_{7} | R_{8} |

=== Beginning of the next Congress, March 4, 1913 ===
| | | D_{1} | D_{2} | D_{3} | D_{4} | D_{5} | D_{6} | D_{7} | D_{8} |
| D_{18} | D_{17} | D_{16} | D_{15} | D_{14} | D_{13} | D_{12} | D_{11} | D_{10} | D_{9} |
| D_{19} | D_{20} | D_{21} | D_{22} | D_{23} | D_{24} | D_{25} | D_{26} | D_{27} | D_{28} |
| D_{38} | D_{37} | D_{36} | D_{35} | D_{34} | D_{33} | D_{32} | D_{31} | D_{30} | D_{29} |
| D_{39} | D_{40} | D_{41} | D_{42} | D_{43} | D_{44} | D_{45} | D_{46} | D_{47} | D_{48} |
| Majority → | | | | | | | | | D_{49} Ga. Appointed |
| R_{39} | R_{40} | R_{41} | R_{42} | V_{4} Ill. (reg) | V_{3} Ill. (sp) | V_{2} W.Va. Seated late | P_{1} Wash. Changed | V_{1} N.H. | D_{49} Ga. Appointed |
| R_{38} | R_{37} | R_{36} | R_{35} | R_{34} | R_{33} | R_{32} | R_{31} | R_{30} | R_{29} |
| R_{19} | R_{20} | R_{21} | R_{22} | R_{23} | R_{24} | R_{25} | R_{26} | R_{27} | R_{28} |
| R_{18} | R_{17} | R_{16} | R_{15} | R_{14} | R_{13} | R_{12} | R_{11} | R_{10} | R_{9} |
| | | R_{1} | R_{2} | R_{3} | R_{4} | R_{5} | R_{6} | R_{7} | R_{8} |

=== Beginning of the first session, April 7, 1913 ===
| | | D_{1} | D_{2} | D_{3} | D_{4} | D_{5} | D_{6} | D_{7} | D_{8} |
| D_{18} | D_{17} | D_{16} | D_{15} | D_{14} | D_{13} | D_{12} | D_{11} | D_{10} | D_{9} |
| D_{19} | D_{20} | D_{21} | D_{22} | D_{23} | D_{24} | D_{25} | D_{26} | D_{27} | D_{28} |
| D_{38} | D_{37} | D_{36} | D_{35} | D_{34} | D_{33} | D_{32} | D_{31} | D_{30} | D_{29} |
| D_{39} | D_{40} | D_{41} | D_{42} | D_{43} | D_{44} | D_{45} | D_{46} | D_{47} | D_{48} |
| Majority → | | | | | | | | | D_{49} |
| R_{39} | R_{40} | R_{41} | R_{42} | R_{43} Ill. (reg); Gain | R_{44} Ill. (sp); Gain | R_{45} W.Va. Seated late | P_{1} | D_{50} N.H. Gain | D_{49} |
| R_{38} | R_{37} | R_{36} | R_{35} | R_{34} | R_{33} | R_{32} | R_{31} | R_{30} | R_{29} |
| R_{19} | R_{20} | R_{21} | R_{22} | R_{23} | R_{24} | R_{25} | R_{26} | R_{27} | R_{28} |
| R_{18} | R_{17} | R_{16} | R_{15} | R_{14} | R_{13} | R_{12} | R_{11} | R_{10} | R_{9} |
| | | R_{1} | R_{2} | R_{3} | R_{4} | R_{5} | R_{6} | R_{7} | R_{8} |

Key

| D_{#} | Democratic |
| P_{#} | Progressive |
| R_{#} | Republican |
| V_{#} | Vacant |

== Race summaries ==
=== Special elections during the 62nd Congress ===
In these special elections, the winners were seated in the 62nd Congress during 1912 or before March 4, 1913; ordered by election date.

| State | Incumbent | | | Results | Candidates |
| State | Senator | Party | Electoral history | Results | Candidates |
|---|---|---|---|---|---|
| Virginia (Class 1) | Claude A. Swanson | Democratic | 1910 (appointed) | Interim appointee elected January 23, 1912. | ▌ ✓ Claude A. Swanson (Democratic); Unopposed |
| New Mexico (Class 1) | None (new state) | | | First senators elected March 27, 1912. Republican gain. | ▌ ✓ (Class 2) Albert B. Fall (Republican) 39; ▌ ✓ (Class 1) Thomas B. Catron (Republican) 38; ▌Felix Martinez (Democratic) 25; ▌Andrieus A. Jones (Democratic) 23; ▌William G. Mills (Note: [sic], probably "William J. Mills") (Republican) 7; ▌Herbert J. Hagerman (Progressive Rep.) 3; ▌L. Bradford Prince (Republican) 3; ▌Eugene Romero (Republican) 3; ▌W. H. Gillenwater (Progressive Rep.) 2; ▌O. A. Larrazolo (Republican) 2; ▌Jose D. Sena (Republican) 1 |
| New Mexico (Class 2) | None (new state) | | | First senators elected March 27, 1912. Republican gain. Winner was also subsequently elected to the next term; see below. | ▌ ✓ (Class 2) Albert B. Fall (Republican) 39; ▌ ✓ (Class 1) Thomas B. Catron (Republican) 38; ▌Felix Martinez (Democratic) 25; ▌Andrieus A. Jones (Democratic) 23; ▌William G. Mills (Republican) 7; ▌Herbert J. Hagerman (Progressive Rep.) 3; ▌L. Bradford Prince (Republican) 3; ▌Eugene Romero (Republican) 3; ▌W. H. Gillenwater (Progressive Rep.) 2; ▌O. A. Larrazolo (Republican) 2; ▌Jose D. Sena (Republican) 1 |
| Arizona (Class 1) | None (new state) | | | First senators elected March 26, 1912, ratifying the popular selection made on December 12, 1911, state elections. Democratic gain. | ▌ ✓ Henry F. Ashurst (Democratic); Unopposed In state elections: ▌Henry F. Ashurst (Democratic) 50.00%; ▌Ralph Cameron (Republican) 44.33%; ▌E. Johnson (Socialist) 5.67% |
| Arizona (Class 3) | None (new state) | | | First senators elected March 26, 1912, ratifying the popular selection made on December 12, 1911, state elections. Democratic gain. | ▌ ✓ Marcus A. Smith (Democratic); Unopposed In state elections: ▌Marcus A. Smith (Democratic) 50.35%; ▌Hoval A. Smith (Republican) 43.84%; ▌E. B. Simonton (Socialist) 5.8% |
| Maine (Class 2) | Obadiah Gardner | Democratic | 1911 (appointed) | Interim appointee elected April 2, 1912. | ▌ ✓ Obadiah Gardner (Democratic) 98; ▌Frederick A. Powers (Republican) 56 |
| Colorado (Class 3) | Vacant | | | Charles J. Hughes Jr. (D) died January 11, 1911. New senator elected January 14, 1913, ratifying the popular selection made in 1912 state elections. Democratic gain. | ▌ ✓ Charles S. Thomas (Democratic) 28; ▌Charles W. Waterman (Republican) 4; ▌[FNU] Vincent (Progressive) 1 In state elections: ▌Charles S. Thomas (Democratic) 44.84%; ▌Charles W. Waterman (Republican) 26.76%; ▌Isaac N. Stevens (Progressive) 25.87%; ▌Arthur B. Harris (Prohibition) 2.54% |
| Tennessee (Class 2) | Newell Sanders | Republican | 1912 (appointed) | Interim appointee retired. New senator elected January 24, 1913. Democratic gain. Winner did not run for election to the next term; see below. | ▌ ✓ William R. Webb (Democratic) 73; ▌M. T. Bryan (Democratic) 53; ▌J. A. Clements (Democratic) 1; ▌C. W. Tyler (Democratic) 1 |
| Texas (Class 2) | Rienzi Johnston | Democratic | 1913 (appointed) | Interim appointee lost election. New senator elected January 23, 1913. Democratic hold. Winner also elected to the next term; see below. | ▌ ✓ Morris Sheppard (Democratic) 104; ▌Rienzi Johnston (Democratic) 66 |
| Idaho (Class 3) | Kirtland Perky | Democratic | 1912 (appointed) | Interim appointee retired. New senator elected January 24, 1913. Republican gain. | ▌ ✓ James H. Brady (Republican) 43; ▌James F. Ailshie (Republican) 7; ▌John F. Nugent (Democratic) 5; ▌James E. Babb (Unknown) 5; ▌Robert N. Dunn (Republican) 4; ▌E. H. Dewey (Unknown) 4; ▌John T. Morrison (Republican) 3; ▌Burton L. French (Republican) 2; ▌James Hanrahan (Democratic) 2; Others: ▌C. A. Beale (Unknown) 1; ▌George Fields (Unknown) 1; ▌J. F. Maclane (Unknown) 1; ▌T. L. Burkland (Unknown) 1; ▌W. C. Courtney (Unknown) 1 |
| Arkansas (Class 2) | John N. Heiskell | Democratic | 1913 (appointed) | Interim appointee retired. New senator elected January 27, 1913. Democratic hold. Winner did not run for election to the next term; see below. | ▌ ✓ William M. Kavanaugh (Democratic) 77; Others 58 |
| Nevada (Class 1) | William A. Massey | Republican | 1912 (appointed) | Interim appointee lost election to finish the term. New senator elected (Note: Senator was selected by some form of direct voting and then subsequently elected by state legislatures.) January 28, 1913, ratifying the popular selection made in 1912 state elections. Democratic gain. | ▌ ✓ Key Pittman (Democratic) all except 2; ▌George Stale (Socialist) 2 In state elections: ▌Key Pittman (Democratic) 39.78%; ▌William A. Massey (Republican) 39.34%; ▌George Stale (Socialist) 13.73%; ▌S. Summerfield (Progressive) 7.15% |

=== Races leading to the 63rd Congress ===
In these regular elections, the winner was seated on March 4, 1913; ordered by state.

All of the elections involved the Class 2 seats.

| State | Incumbent | | | Results | Candidates |
| State | Senator | Party | Electoral history | Results | Candidates |
|---|---|---|---|---|---|
| Alabama | John H. Bankhead | Democratic | 1907 (appointed); 1907 (special) | Incumbent had already been re-elected early January 17, 1911, for the term beginning March 4, 1913. | |
| Arkansas | John N. Heiskell | Democratic | 1913 (appointed) | Interim appointee retired. New senator elected January 29, 1913. Democratic hold. | ▌ ✓ Joseph T. Robinson (Democratic) 71; ▌Stephen Brundidge Jr. (Democratic) 36; ▌ Charles N. Norwood (Unknown) 15; ▌ William F. Kirby (Democratic) 8; Others: ▌ William F. Oldfield (Democratic) 1; ▌[FNU] Martin (Unknown) 1; ▌[FNU] Reid (Unknown) 1; ▌[FNU] Taylor (Unknown) 1 |
| Colorado | Simon Guggenheim | Republican | 1907 | Incumbent retired. New senator elected January 14, 1913, ratifying the popular selection made in 1912 state elections. Democratic gain. | ▌ ✓ John F. Shafroth (Democratic) 86; ▌Clyde Dawson (Republican) 11; ▌Frank Catlin (Progressive) 1; ▌[FNU] Hunter (Democratic) 1 In state election: ▌John F. Shafroth (Democratic) 47.34%; ▌Clyde Dawson (Republican) 26.8%; ▌Frank Catlin (Progressive) 23.48%; ▌Mary Miller (Prohibition) 2.38% |
| Delaware | Harry A. Richardson | Republican | 1907 | Incumbent retired. New senator elected January 29, 1913. Democratic gain. | ▌ ✓ Willard Saulsbury Jr. (Democratic) 28; ▌Harry A. Richardson (Republican) 11; ▌John G. Townsend Jr. (Republican) 5; ▌Alfred I. du Pont (Republican) 3; Others: ▌Alexander P. Corbit (Republican) 1; ▌Simeon S. Pennewill (Republican) 1; ▌Ruby R. Vale (Republican) 1 |
| Georgia | Augustus O. Bacon | Democratic | 1894; 1900; 1907 (appointed); 1907 (special) | Incumbent ran for re-election but the legislature failed to elect. Democratic loss. Incumbent was then appointed to begin the term. | ▌Augustus O. Bacon (Democratic) |
| Idaho | William Borah | Republican | 1907 | Incumbent re-elected January 14, 1913. | ▌ ✓ William Borah (Republican) 75; ▌George A. Tannahill (Democratic) 2; ▌Kirtland I. Perky (Democratic) 2 |
| Illinois | Shelby M. Cullom | Republican | 1882; 1888; 1894; 1901; 1907 | Incumbent lost renomination. Legislature failed to elect. Republican loss. A new senator was later elected; see below. | ▌Bernard Berlyn (Socialist); ▌Charles Boeschenstein (Democratic); ▌Frank H. Funk (Progressive); ▌J. Hamilton Lewis (Democratic); ▌[FNU] McDonald (Socialist); ▌Lawrence Y. Sherman (Republican) |
| Iowa | William S. Kenyon | Republican | 1911 (special) | Incumbent re-elected January 21, 1913. | ▌ ✓ William S. Kenyon (Republican); ▌D. W. Hamilton (Democratic) |
| Kansas | Charles Curtis | Republican | 1907 (special); 1907 | Incumbent lost renomination. New senator elected January 28, 1913, ratifying the popular selection made in 1912 state elections. Democratic gain. | ▌ ✓ William H. Thompson (Democratic); ▌Walter R. Stubbs (Republican) 3; ▌Henry J. Allen (Progressive) 1 In state election: ▌William H. Thompson (Democratic) 49.34%; ▌Walter R. Stubbs (Republican) 43.35%; ▌Allan Ricker (Socialist) 7.32% |
| Kentucky | Thomas H. Paynter | Democratic | 1906 | Incumbent retired. New senator elected January 16, 1912, after an election on January 9, 1912. Democratic hold. | ▌ ✓ Ollie James (Democratic) 105; ▌Edwin P. Morrow (Republican) 29 |
| Louisiana | Murphy J. Foster | Democratic | 1900; 1904 | Incumbent lost renomination. New senator elected May 21, 1912. Democratic hold. | ▌ ✓ Joseph E. Ransdell (Democratic); Unopposed |
| Maine | Obadiah Gardner | Democratic | 1911 (appointed); 1912 (special) | Incumbent lost re-election. New senator elected January 15, 1913. Republican gain. | ▌ ✓ Edwin C. Burleigh (Republican) 91; ▌Obadiah Gardner (Democratic) 82; ▌E. M. Thompson (Progressive) 7 |
| Massachusetts | Winthrop M. Crane | Republican | 1904 (appointed); 1905 (special); 1907 | Incumbent retired. New senator elected January 14, 1913. Republican hold. | ▌ ✓ John W. Weeks (Republican)160; ▌Sherman L. Whipple (Democratic) 80; ▌John Graham Brooks (Progressive) 5; ▌John A. Keliher (Democratic) 1; ▌Joseph C. Pelletier (Democratic) 1; Scattering 25 |
| Michigan | William A. Smith | Republican | 1911 | Incumbent re-elected January 14, 1913. | ▌ ✓ William A. Smith (Republican) 74; ▌Alfred Lucking (Democratic) 41; ▌Theodore Joslin (Progressive) 17 |
| Minnesota | Knute Nelson | Republican | 1895; 1901; 1907 | Incumbent re-elected January 21, 1913, ratifying the popular selection made in 1912 state elections. | ▌ ✓ Knute Nelson (Republican) 178 In state election: ▌Knute Nelson (Republican) 62.8%; ▌Daniel W. Lawler (Democratic) 37.2% |
| Mississippi | LeRoy Percy | Democratic | 1910 (special) | Incumbent lost renomination. New senator elected January 16, 1912. Democratic hold. | ▌ ✓ James K. Vardaman (Democratic); Unopposed |
| Montana | Joseph M. Dixon | Republican | 1907 | Incumbent lost re-election as a Progressive. New senator elected January 14, 1913, ratifying the popular selection made in 1912 state elections. Democratic gain. | ▌ ✓ Thomas J. Walsh (Democratic); Unopposed In state election: ▌Thomas J. Walsh (Democratic) 41.17%; ▌Joseph M. Dixon (Progressive) 32.1%; ▌Henry C. Smith (Republican) 26.73% |
| Nebraska | Norris Brown | Republican | 1907 | Incumbent lost renomination. New senator elected January 21, 1913, ratifying the popular selection made in 1912 state elections. Republican hold. | ▌ ✓ George W. Norris (Republican); Unopposed In state election: ▌George W. Norris (Republican); ▌Ashton C. Shallenberger (Democratic) |
| New Hampshire | Henry E. Burnham | Republican | 1901; 1907 | Incumbent retired. Legislature failed to elect. Republican loss. New senator was elected late; see below. | ▌Robert P. Bass (Progressive); ▌Sherman E. Burroughs (Republican); ▌Clarence Carr (Democratic); ▌Henry F. Hollis (Democratic); ▌John H. Bartlett (Republican); ▌Edward N. Pearson (Republican); ▌William D. Swart (Independent); ▌Henry B. Quinby (Republican); ▌Gordon Woodbury (Democratic) |
| New Jersey | Frank O. Briggs | Republican | 1907 | Incumbent lost re-election. New senator elected January 28, 1913. Democratic gain. | ▌ ✓ William Hughes (Democratic) 63; ▌Frank O. Briggs (Republican) 17 |
| New Mexico | Albert B. Fall | Republican | 1912 (new state) | Incumbent re-elected June 6, 1912. Legislature invalidated the election. Incumbent then re-elected January 28, 1913. | January 28, 1913, election: ▌ ✓ Albert B. Fall (Republican) 43; Scattering 25 June 6, 1912 election: ▌Albert B. Fall (Republican) 40; ▌W. H. Andrews (Republican) 2; ▌R. L. Byea (Republican) 2 |
| North Carolina | F. M. Simmons | Democratic | 1901; 1907 | Incumbent re-elected January 21, 1913. | ▌ ✓ F. M. Simmons (Democratic) 144; ▌Cyrus Thompson (Republican) 19 |
| Oklahoma | Robert L. Owen | Democratic | 1907 | Incumbent re-elected January 21, 1913. | ▌ ✓ Robert L. Owen (Democratic) In state election: ▌Robert L. Owen (Democratic) 50.43%; ▌Joseph Dickerson (Republican) 33.28%; ▌John Wills (Socialist) 16.3% |
| Oregon | Jonathan Bourne Jr. | Republican | 1907 | Incumbent lost renomination and then lost re-election as Popular Government candidate. New senator elected January 21, 1913, ratifying the popular selection made in 1912 state elections. Democratic gain. | ▌ ✓ Harry Lane (Democratic) In state election: ▌Harry Lane (Democratic) 30.07%; ▌Ben Selling (Republican) 28.79%; ▌Jonathan Bourne Jr. (Popular Gov.) 19.41%; ▌Benjamin Ramp (Socialist) 8.31%; ▌A. E. Clark (Progressive) 8.3%; ▌B. Lee Paget (Prohibition) 5.13% |
| Rhode Island | George P. Wetmore | Republican | 1894; 1900; 1907 (no election); 1908 (special) | Incumbent retired. New senator elected January 21, 1913. Republican hold. | ▌ ✓ LeBaron B. Colt (Republican) 88; ▌Addison P. Munroe (Democratic) 42; ▌George W. Parks (Progressive) 7 |
| South Carolina | Benjamin Tillman | Democratic | 1894; 1901; 1907 | Incumbent re-elected January 28, 1913. | ▌ ✓ Benjamin Tillman (Democratic); Unopposed |
| South Dakota | Robert J. Gamble | Republican | 1901; 1907 | Incumbent lost renomination. New senator elected January 22, 1913. Republican hold. | ▌ ✓ Thomas Sterling (Republican) 97 |
| Tennessee | Newell Sanders | Republican | 1912 (appointed) | Interim appointee retired. New senator elected January 23, 1913. Democratic gain. | ▌ ✓ John K. Shields (Democratic) 69; ▌Charles T. Cates Jr. (Ind. Democratic) 61 |
| Texas | Rienzi Johnston | Democratic | 1913 (appointed) | Interim appointee retired. New senator elected January 28, 1913. Democratic hold. | ▌ ✓ Morris Sheppard (Democratic); Unopposed |
| Virginia | Thomas S. Martin | Democratic | 1893 (early); 1899 (early); 1906 | Incumbent re-elected January 23, 1912. | ▌ ✓ Thomas S. Martin (Democratic); Unopposed |
| West Virginia | Clarence W. Watson | Democratic | 1911 (special) | Incumbent lost re-election. New senator elected February 21, 1913. Republican gain. Winner took seat late. | ▌ ✓ Nathan Goff Jr. (Republican) 60; ▌Clarence W. Watson (Democratic) 43; Others: ▌Robert W. Dailey (Democratic) 1; ▌John W. Davis (Democratic) 1; ▌John W. Hamilton (Democratic) 1 |
| Wyoming | Francis E. Warren | Republican | 1890; 1893 (lost); 1895; 1901; 1907 | Incumbent re-elected January 28, 1913. | ▌ ✓ Francis E. Warren (Republican) 45; ▌John B. Kendrick (Democratic) 38 |

=== Early election to the following Congress ===
In this early general election, the winner was seated in the 64th Congress, starting March 4, 1915.

| State | Incumbent | | | Results | Candidates |
| State | Senator | Party | Electoral history | Results | Candidates |
|---|---|---|---|---|---|
| Louisiana (Class 3) | John Thornton | Democratic | 1910 (special) | Incumbent retired. New senator elected early May 21, 1912. Democratic hold. | ▌ ✓ Robert F. Broussard (Democratic); Unopposed |

=== Elections during the 63rd Congress ===
In these elections (some special, some merely late), the winners were seated in 1913 after March 4.

Some of those five elections late and some special, some by legislatures before ratification of the amendment and some popularly thereafter:

- Two elections were late and elected by legislatures: New Hampshire and Illinois (Class 2)
- One election was special and elected by a legislature: Illinois (Class 3)
- One election was late and elected popularly: Georgia
- One election was special and elected popularly: Maryland

They are ordered here by election date, then by class.

| State | Incumbent | | | Results | Candidates |
| State | Senator | Party | Electoral history | Results | Candidates |
|---|---|---|---|---|---|
| New Hampshire (Class 2) | Vacant | | | Legislature had failed to elect in time. New senator elected late March 13, 1913 on the 43rd ballot. Democratic gain. | ▌ ✓ Henry F. Hollis (Democratic) 189; ▌John H. Bartlett (Republican) 121; ▌Henry B. Quinby (Republican) 18; ▌Edward N. Pearson (Republican) 14; ▌Robert P. Bass (Progressive) 12; Scattering 17 |
| Illinois (Class 2) | Vacant | | | Legislature had failed to elect in time. New senator elected late March 26, 1913. Democratic gain. | ▌ ✓ J. Hamilton Lewis (Democratic) 164; ▌Frank H. Funk (Progressive) 22; ▌Lawrence Y. Sherman (Republican) 9; ▌Bernard Berlyn (Socialist) 4 |
| Illinois (Class 3) | Vacant | | | 1909 election of William Lorimer (R) was voided July 13, 1912. New senator elected March 26, 1913. Republican gain. | ▌ ✓ Lawrence Y. Sherman (Republican) 143; ▌Charles Boeschenstein (Democratic) 25; ▌Frank H. Funk (Republican) 22; ▌[FNU] McDonald (Socialist) 4; Scattering 2 |
Elected by popular vote after ratification of the 17th Amendment
| Georgia (Class 2) | Augustus O. Bacon | Democratic | 1894; 1900; 1907 (appointed); 1907 (special); 1913 (appointed) | Legislature had failed to elect in time, so the incumbent was appointed to begin the term. Interim appointee re-elected late June 15, 1913. | ▌ ✓ Augustus O. Bacon (Democratic); Unopposed |
| Maryland (Class 1) | William P. Jackson | Republican | 1912 (appointed) | Appointee retired when elected successor qualified. New senator elected November 4, 1913 to finish the term ending March 3, 1917. Winner did not qualify until January 28, 1914. Democratic gain. | ▌ ✓ Blair Lee (Democratic); ▌Thomas Parran Sr. (Republican) |

== Alabama ==
Incumbent Senator John H. Bankhead had already been re-elected early on January 17, 1911 for the 1913 term.

== Arkansas ==
One-term incumbent Senator Jeff Davis died on January 3, 1913. Democratic Governor of Arkansas Joseph T. Robinson appointed John N. Heiskell on January 6, 1913, to continue the term just until a special election.

=== Arkansas (special) ===
Arkansas special election (class 2)
- January 24, 1913
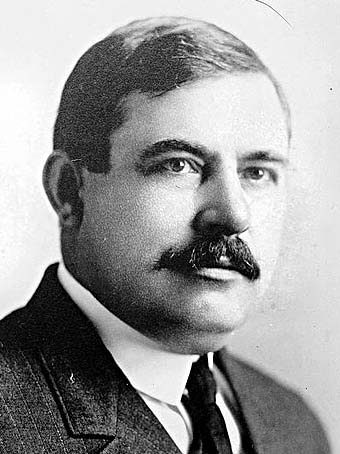
| Nominee | William Kavanaugh | Scattering |
| Party | Democratic |
| Members' vote | 77 | 58 |
| Percentage | 57.0% | 43.0% |
U.S. senator before election
John N. Heiskell
Democratic
Elected U.S. senator
William Kavanaugh
Democratic

John N. Heiskell was not a candidate in the special election. On January 29, 1913, the Arkansas Legislature elected Democratic businessman and former judge William Marmaduke Kavanaugh just to finish the term that would end in March 1913.

- ✓ William Kavanaugh (Democratic) 77 votes
- Others 58 votes

=== Arkansas (regular) ===
Arkansas general election (class 2)
- January 24, 1913
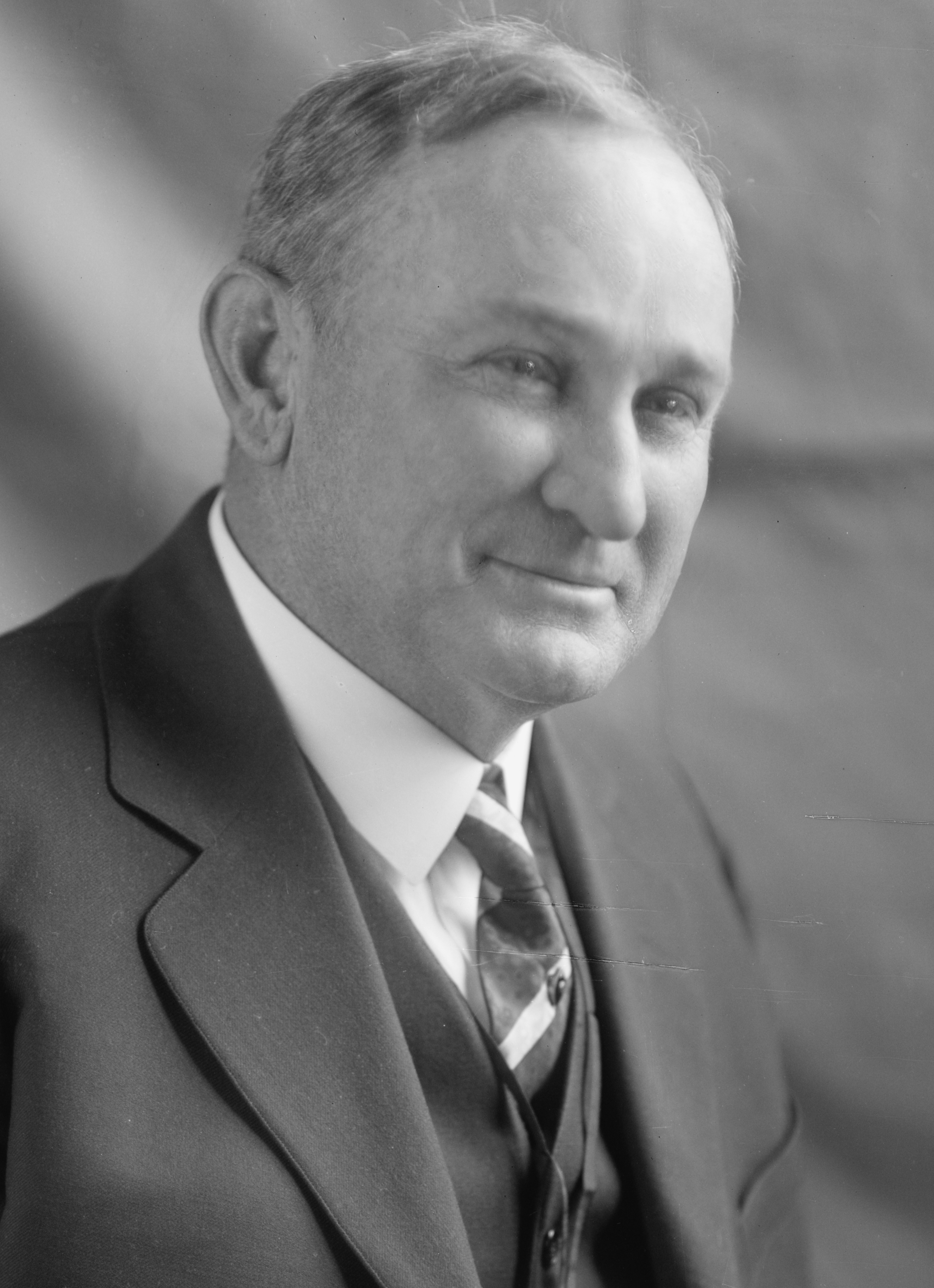
| Nominee | Joseph T. Robinson | Stephen Brundidge Jr. |
| Party | Democratic | Democratic |
| Members' vote | 71 | 36 |
| Percentage | 53.0% | 26.9% |
U.S. senator before election
John N. Heiskell
Democratic
Elected U.S. senator
Joseph T. Robinson
Democratic

Neither Heiskell nor Kavanaugh were candidates in the general election. On January 29, 1913, the Arkansas Legislature elected the Democratic Governor Joseph T. Robinson to the next term. This would be the last Senate election by a state legislature before the April 8, 1913, adoption of the 17th Amendment. Robinson would later become leader of Senate Democrats and Senate majority leader.

- ✓ Joseph T. Robinson (Democratic) 71 votes
- Stephen Brundige (Democratic) 36 votes
- Norwood 15 votes
- Kirby 8 votes
- Oldfield 1 vote
- Martin 1 vote
- Reid 1 vote
- Taylor 1 vote

== Arizona ==
Arizona class 1 election
- December 12, 1911, March 26, 1912
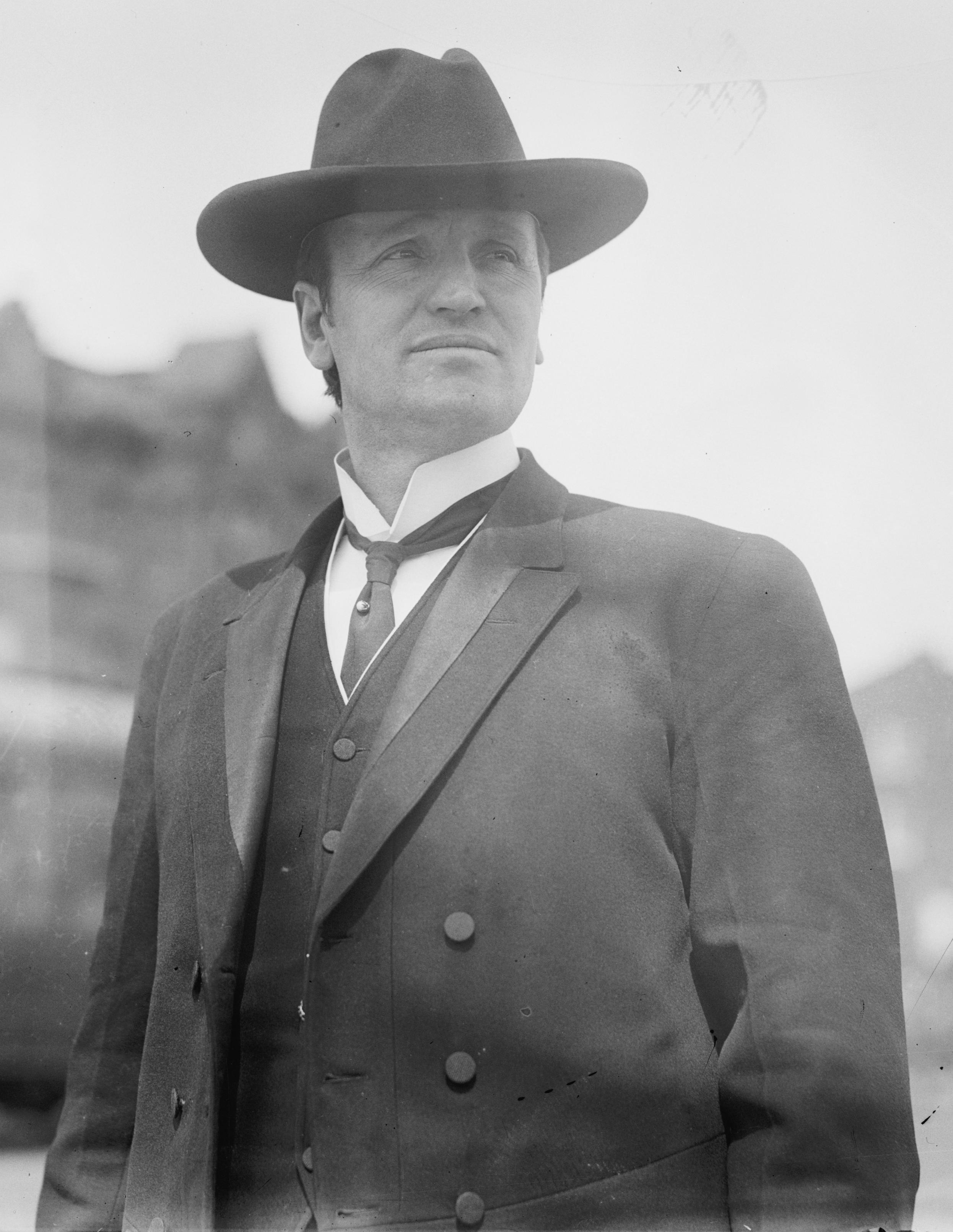

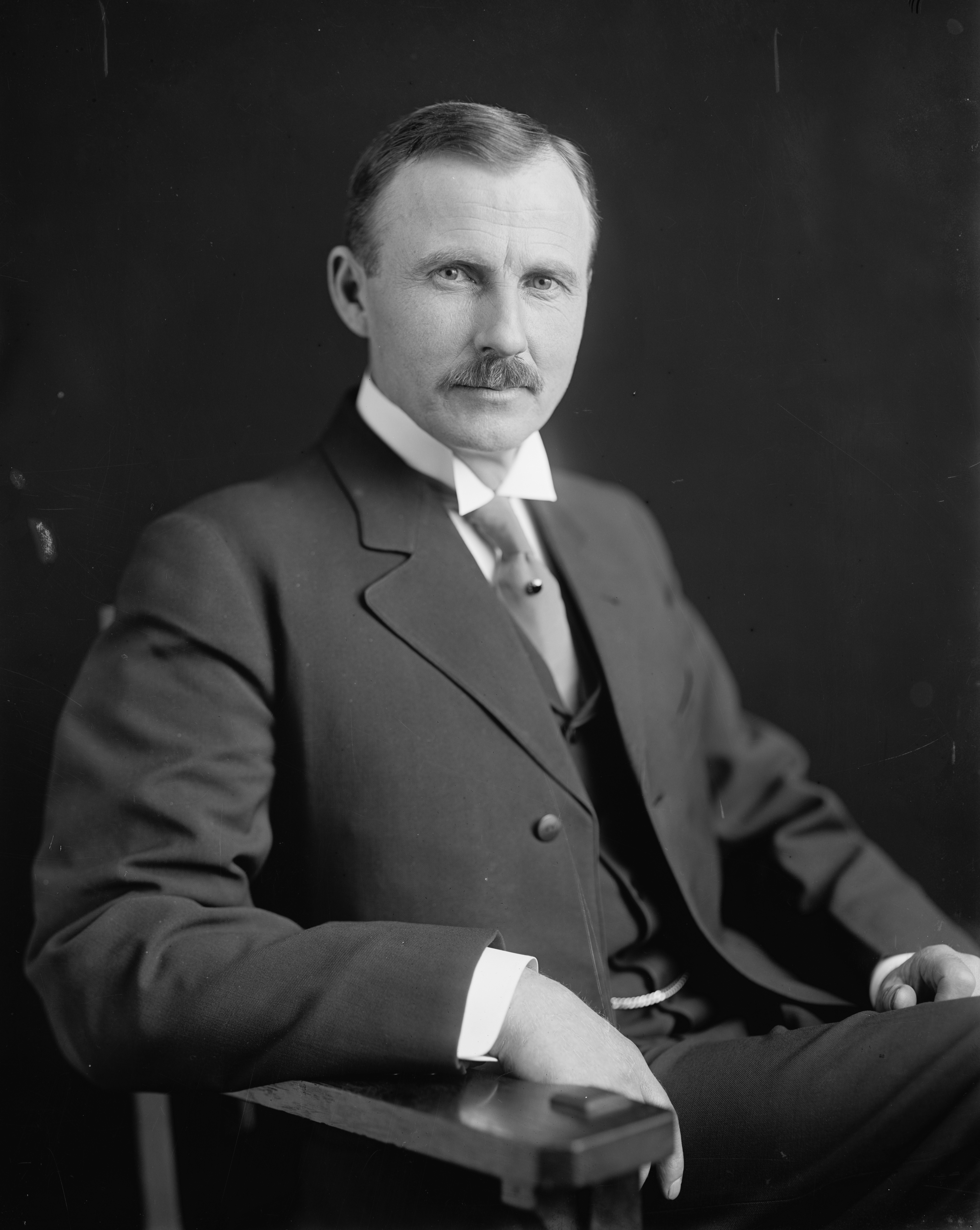
| Nominee | Henry F. Ashurst | Ralph H. Cameron |
| Party | Democratic | Republican |
| Electoral vote | 54 | 0 |
| Popular vote | 10,872 | 9,640 |
| Percentage | 50.00% | 44.33% |
U.S. senator before election
none
Elected U.S. Senator
To be formally determined by the Arizona legislature

Arizona class 3 election
- December 12, 1911, March 26, 1912
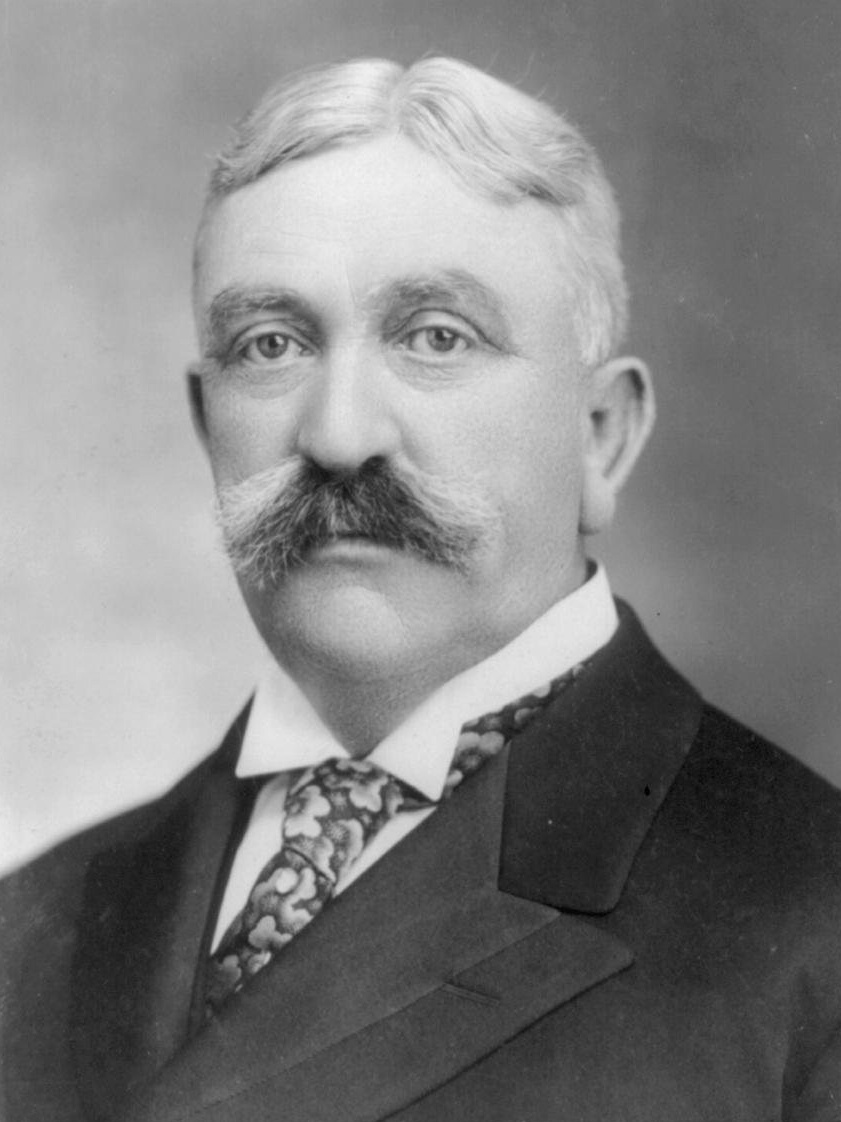

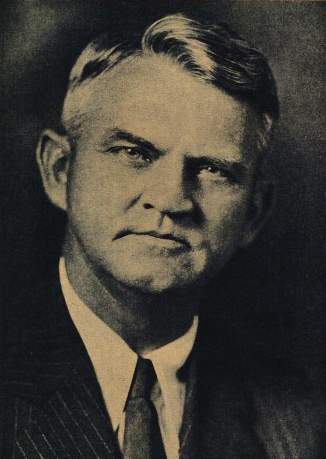
| Nominee | Marcus A. Smith | Hoval A. Smith |
| Party | Democratic | Republican |
| Electoral vote | 54 | 0 |
| Popular vote | 10,598 | 9,228 |
| Percentage | 50.35% | 43.85% |
U.S. senator before election
none
Elected U.S. Senator
To be formally determined by the Arizona legislature

Arizona became a new state on February 14, 1912, with senators in classes 1 (ending 1917) and 3 (ending 1915). For the initial senators there was a popular vote held December 12, 1911 — before statehood — and the newly formed state legislature effectively ratified the popular votes March 26, 1912: Democrat Henry F. Ashurst (class 1) and Democrat Marcus A. Smith (class 3).

Henry F. Ashurst was elected to the Territorial House of Representatives in 1897. He was re-elected in 1899, and became the territory's youngest speaker. In 1902, he was elected to the Territorial Senate. In 1911, Ashurst presided over Arizona's constitutional convention. During the convention, he positioned himself for a U.S. Senate seat by avoiding the political fighting over various clauses in the Constitution which damaged his rivals.

Arizona general election (Class 1)
| Party | Candidate | Votes | % |
|---|---|---|---|
| Democratic | Henry F. Ashurst | 10,872 | 50.00% |
| Republican | Ralph H. Cameron | 9,640 | 44.33% |
| Socialist | E. Johnson | 1,234 | 5.68% |
| Majority | | 1,232 | 5.67% |
| Turnout | | 21,746 | |

Marcus A. Smith announced his candidacy for one of Arizona's two senate seats on September 24, 1911. As the campaign began, Smith abandoned his long standing conservative stand and declared himself a "Progressive".

Arizona general election (class 3)
| Party | Candidate | Votes | % |
|---|---|---|---|
| Democratic | Marcus A. Smith | 10,598 | 50.35% |
| Republican | Hoval A. Smith | 9,228 | 43.85% |
| Socialist | E. B. Simonton | 1,221 | 5.80% |
| Majority | | 1,370 | 6.50% |
| Turnout | | 21,047 | |

With the admission of Arizona as a state in 1912, the Arizona State Legislature confirmed the selection of Smith and Ashurst as the state's first U.S. senators on March 27, 1912, taking office April 2, 1912.

Arizona Senate election, March 23, 1912
| Party | Candidate | Votes | % |
|---|---|---|---|
| Democratic | Henry F. Ashurst | 19 | 100% |
| Democratic | Marcus A. Smith | 19 | 100% |

Arizona House of Representatives election, March 26, 1912
| Party | Candidate | Votes | % |
|---|---|---|---|
| Democratic | Henry F. Ashurst | 35 | 100% |
| Democratic | Marcus A. Smith | 35 | 100% |

== Colorado ==
On January 14, 1913, the Colorado General Assembly elected both of the state's senators: Governor John F. Shafroth for the class 2 seat (ending 1919) and Democrat Charles S. Thomas for the class 3 seat (ending 1915).

=== Colorado (regular) ===
1912 United States Senate election in Colorado
- November 5, 1912
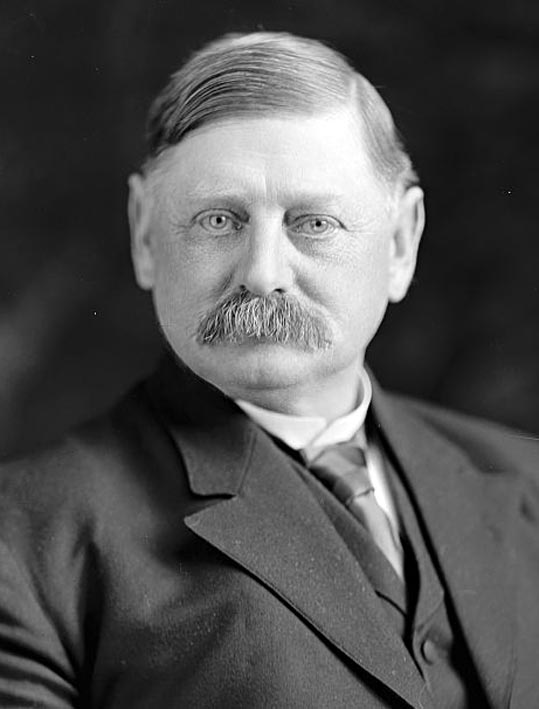

| Nominee | John F. Shafroth | Clyde Dawson | Frank Catlin |
| Party | Democratic | Republican | Progressive |
| Popular vote | 118,260; 47.3% | 66,949; 26.8% | 58,649; 23.5% |
| Legislative vote | 86; 87.8% | 11; 11.2% | 1; 1.0% |
- County results Shafroth: 30–40% 40–50% 50–60% 60–70% Dawson: 30–40% 40–50% 60–70%
U.S. senator before election
Simon Guggenheim
Republican
Elected U.S. senator
John F. Shafroth
Democratic

One-term Republican incumbent Simon Guggenheim chose to retire in the term beginning March 4, 1913.

In the 1912 state elections, Democratic Governor of Colorado John F. Shafroth won the popular vote.

Colorado popular vote, class 2
| Party | Candidate | Votes | % |
|---|---|---|---|
| Democratic | John F. Shafroth | 118,260 | 47.34% |
| Republican | Clyde Dawson | 66,949 | 26.80% |
| Progressive | Frank Catlin | 58,649 | 23.48% |
| Prohibition | Mary E. Miller | 5,948 | 2.38% |

The Colorado General Assembly ratified that decision on January 14, 1913, by electing Thomas.

Colorado legislative vote, class 2 (combined votes of both houses)
| Party | Candidate | Votes | % |
|---|---|---|---|
| Democratic | John F. Shafroth | 86 | 87.8% |
| Republican | Clyde Dawson | 11 | 11.2% |
| Progressive | Frank Catlin | 1 | 1.0% |
| Democratic gain from Republican | | | |

=== Colorado (special) ===
1912 United States Senate special election in Colorado
- November 5, 1912
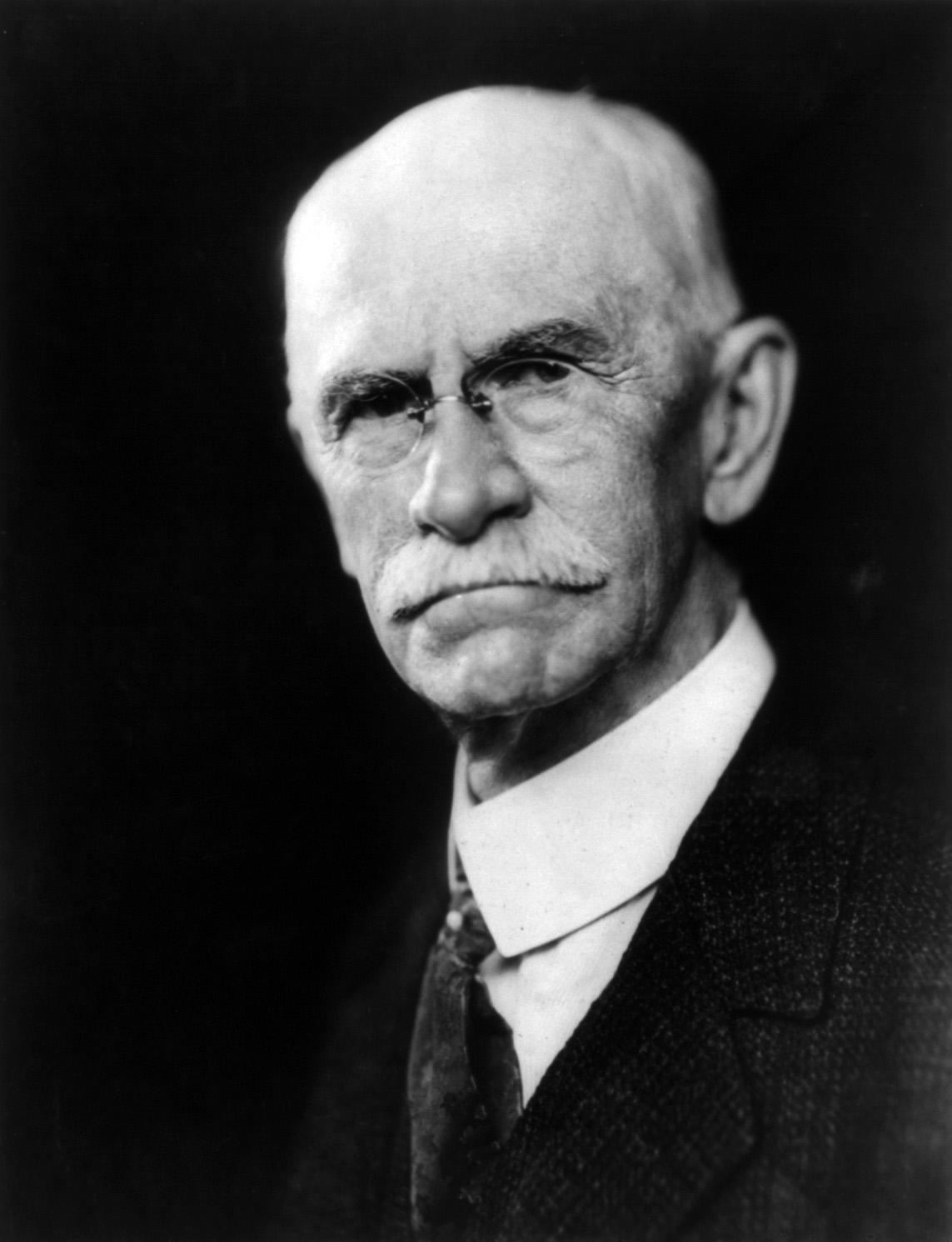

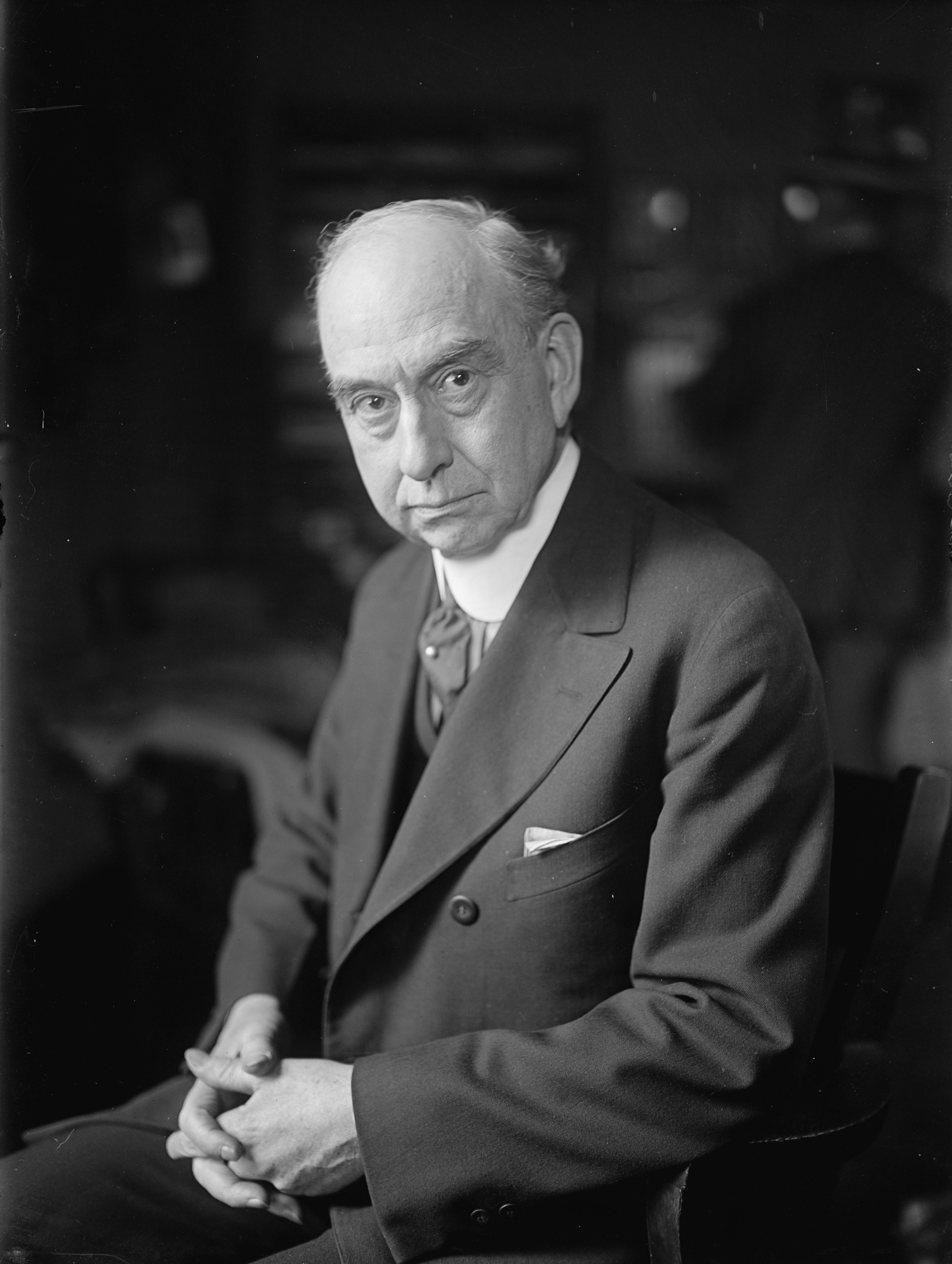

| Nominee | Charles S. Thomas | Charles W. Waterman | Isaac N. Stevens |
| Party | Democratic | Republican | Progressive |
| Popular vote | 111,633; 44.9% | 66,627; 26.8% | 64,405; 25.9% |
| Legislative vote | 88; 88.9% | 9; 9.1% | 1; 1.0% |
- County results Thomas: 30–40% 40–50% 50–60% 60–70% Waterman: 30–40% 40–50% 60–70%
U.S. senator before election
Vacant
Elected U.S. senator
Charles S. Thomas
Democratic

Democrat Charles J. Hughes Jr. (D) had died on January 11, 1911, and the seat remained vacant for two years because the Colorado General Assembly failed to elect a successor.

In the 1912 state elections, Democrat Charles S. Thomas (former governor of Colorado) won the popular vote.

Colorado popular vote, class 3
| Party | Candidate | Votes | % |
|---|---|---|---|
| Democratic | Charles S. Thomas | 111,633 | 44.9% |
| Republican | Charles W. Waterman | 66,627 | 26.8% |
| Progressive | Isaac N. Stevens | 64,405 | 25.9% |
| Prohibition | Arthur B. Harris | 6,318 | 2.5% |

The Colorado General Assembly ratified that decision on January 14, 1913, by overwhelmingly voting for Thomas.

Colorado legislative vote, class 3 (combined votes of both houses)
| Party | Candidate | Votes | % |
|---|---|---|---|
| Democratic | Charles S. Thomas | 88 | 88.9% |
| Republican | Charles W. Waterman | 9 | 9.1% |
| Progressive | Vincent | 1 | 1.0% |
| Progressive | Isaac N. Stevens | 1 | 1.0% |
| Democratic gain from Vacant | | | |

== Delaware ==
Delaware election
- January 29, 1913

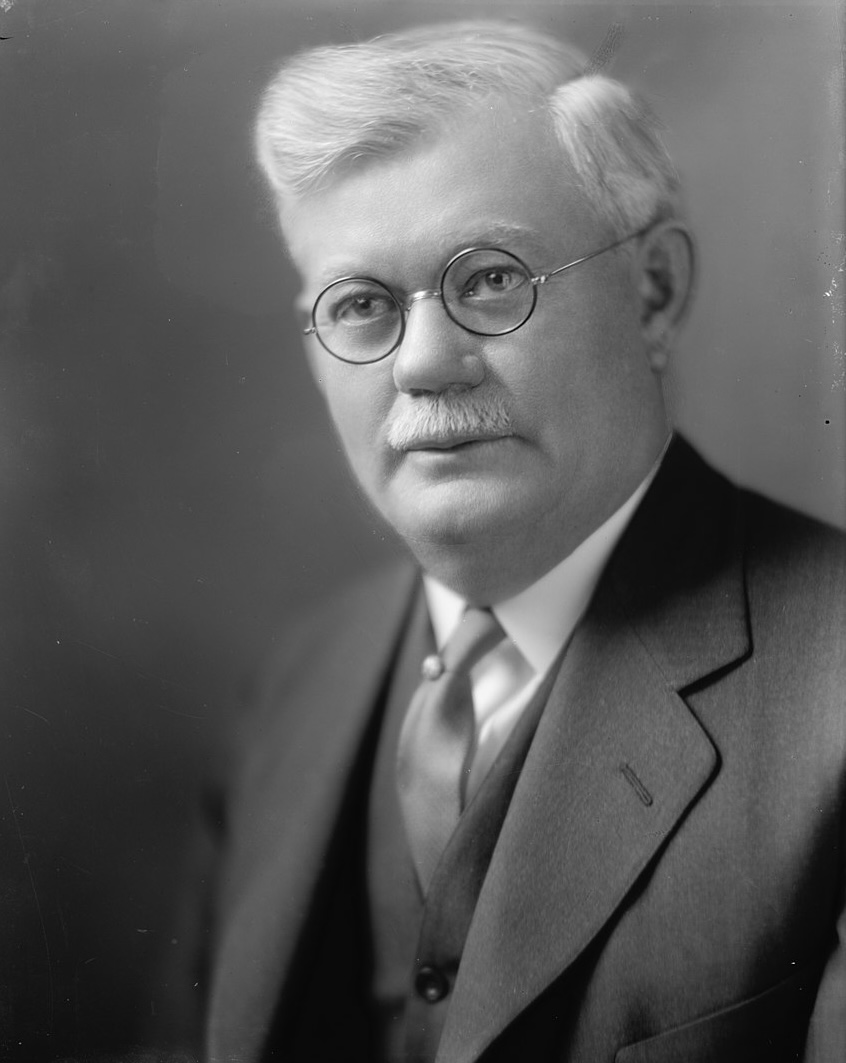
| Nominee | Willard Saulsbury Jr. | H. A. Richardson | John G. Townsend Jr. |
| Party | Democratic | Republican | Republican |
| Members' vote | 28 | 11 | 5 |
| Percentage | 53.8% | 21.2% | 9.6% |
U.S. senator before election
Harry A. Richardson
Republican
Elected U.S. Senator
Willard Saulsbury Jr.
Democratic

Incumbent Republican Harry A. Richardson retired after one term in office.

Democrat Willard Saulsbury Jr. had been a member of the Democratic National Committee since 1908 and had run for U.S. senator in 1899, 1901, 1903, 1905, 1907, and 1911, but Republicans controlled the state legislature and he was unsuccessful. In 1913, however, Democrats were in control of the legislature, Saulsbury was the preference of most Democrats, and he obtained the required majority on January 29, 1913, after several days of balloting. This election was the first time since 1883 that a Democrat won a full term for this Senate seat in Delaware.

Delaware legislative election
| Party | Candidate | Votes | % |
|---|---|---|---|
| Democratic | Willard Saulsbury Jr. | 28 | 53.8% |
| Republican | H. A. Richardson | 11 | 21.2% |
| Republican | John G. Townsend | 5 | 9.6% |
| Republican | Alfred I. du Pont | 3 | 5.8% |
| Republican | Alexander P. Corbit | 3 | 5.8% |
| Republican | Simeon S. Pennewill | 1 | 1.9% |
| Republican | Ruby R. Vale | 1 | 1.9% |

== Georgia ==
Georgia late election
- June 15, 1913
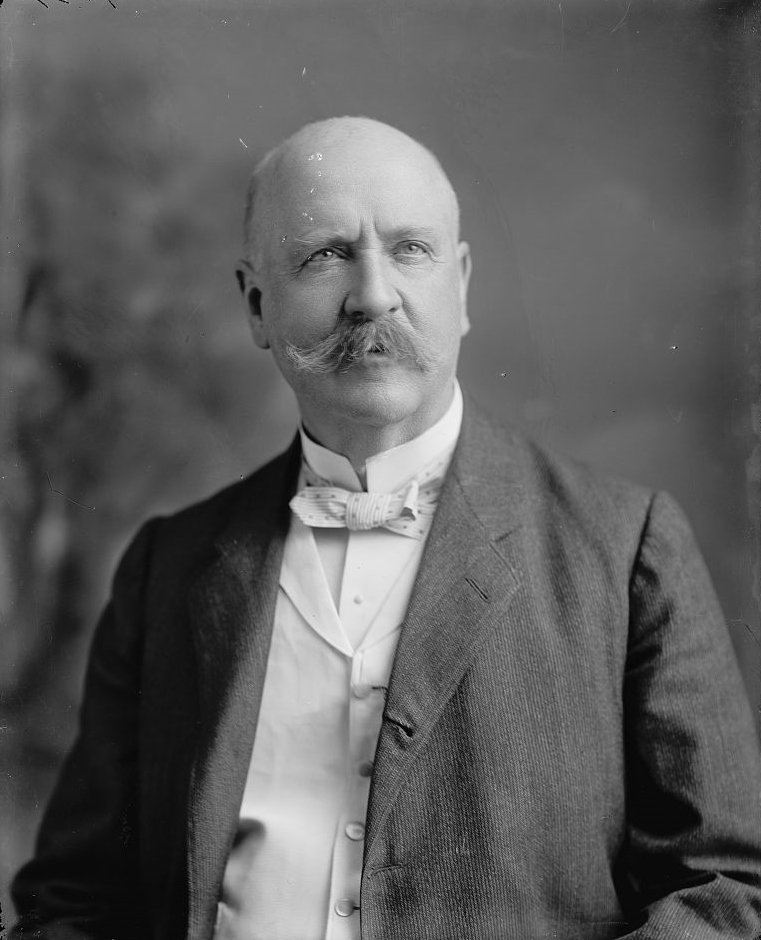
| Nominee | Augustus Octavius Bacon |
| Party | Democratic |
| Percentage | Unopposed |
U.S. senator before election
Augustus Octavius Bacon
Democratic
Elected U.S. Senator
Augustus Octavius Bacon
Democratic

The Georgia General Assembly failed to elect a senator, as Democratic incumbent Augustus O. Bacon's term ended. The governor of Georgia therefore appointed Bacon to begin the term, pending a late election.

On June 15, 1913, Bacon was elected by the general populace without opposition, becoming the first senator elected under the Seventeenth Amendment to the United States Constitution.

Bacon died in early 1914, however, leading to another interim appointment and eventual special election.

== Idaho ==
=== Idaho (regular) ===
Idaho general election (class 2)
- January 14, 1913
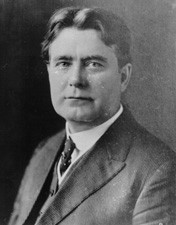

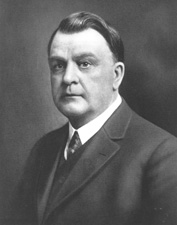
| Nominee | William Borah | Kirtland I. Perky |
| Party | Republican | Democratic |
| Members' vote | 75 | 2 |
| Percentage | 94.9% | 2.5% |
U.S. senator before election
William Borah
Republican
Elected U.S. Senator
William Borah
Republican

First term Republican incumbent William Borah was easily re-elected over two Democratic challengers.

Idaho legislative election, class 2 (January 14, 1913)
| Party | Candidate | Votes | % |
|---|---|---|---|
| Republican | William Borah (incumbent) | 75 | 94.9% |
| Democratic | Kirtland I. Perky | 2 | 2.5% |
| Democratic | George A. Tannahill | 2 | 2.5% |
| Republican hold | | | |

=== Idaho (special) ===
Idaho special election (class 3)
- January 24, 1913
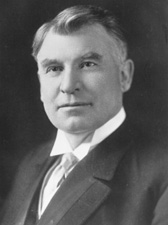

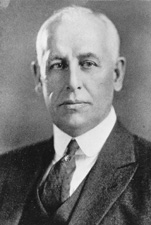
| Nominee | James H. Brady | James F. Ailshie | John F. Nugent |
| Party | Republican | Republican | Democratic |
| Legislative vote | 43 | 7 | 5 |
| Percentage | 53.8% | 8.8% | 6.3% |
| Nominee | James E. Babb | Robert N. Dunn | E. H. Dewey |
| Party | Independent | Republican | Independent |
| Legislative vote | 5 | 4 | 4 |
| Percentage | 6.3% | 5.0% | 5.0% |
U.S. senator before election
James H. Brady
Democratic
Elected U.S. Senator
James H. Brady
Republican

Two-term incumbent Republican Weldon B. Heyburn died on October 17, 1912. Democratic lawyer and former Judge Kirtland I. Perky was appointed on November 18, 1912, to continue the term pending a special election.

Perky was not a candidate in the special election, which was won by Republican former Governor James H. Brady. Brady would win re-election in a popular vote in 1914.

Idaho legislative election, class 3 (January 24, 1913)
| Party | Candidate | Votes | % |
|---|---|---|---|
| Republican | James H. Brady (incumbent) | 43 | 53.8% |
| Republican | James F. Ailshie | 7 | 8.8% |
| Democratic | John F. Nugent | 5 | 6.3% |
| Unknown | James E. Babb | 5 | 6.3% |
| Unknown | Robert N. Dunn | 4 | 5.0% |
| Unknown | E. H. Dewey | 4 | 5.0% |
| Republican | J. T. Morrison | 3 | 3.8% |
| Republican | Burton L. French | 2 | 2.5% |
| Democratic | James Hanrahan | 2 | 2.5% |
| Unknown | C. A. Beale | 1 | 1.3% |
| Unknown | George Fields | 1 | 1.3% |
| Unknown | J. F. Maclane | 1 | 1.3% |
| Unknown | T. L. Burkland | 1 | 1.3% |
| Unknown | W. C. Courtney | 1 | 1.3% |
| Republican gain from Democratic | | | |

== Illinois ==
In the November 1912 state elections, the Republicans lost control of the state due to the Republican / Progressive split. However, though the Democrats held a plurality of the Illinois General Assembly, they did not have a majority. The General Assembly took up the matter of electing the senators on February 1. The General Assembly therefore failed to elect until after the new congress began.

On March 26, in a compromise arranged by governor Dunne, the General Assembly elected Democrat J. Hamilton Lewis to fill the full-term seat, and Republican Lawrence Y. Sherman to fill the two remaining years of a vacancy that had just recently opened.

=== Illinois (regular) ===
Illinois general election (class 2)
- March 26, 1913
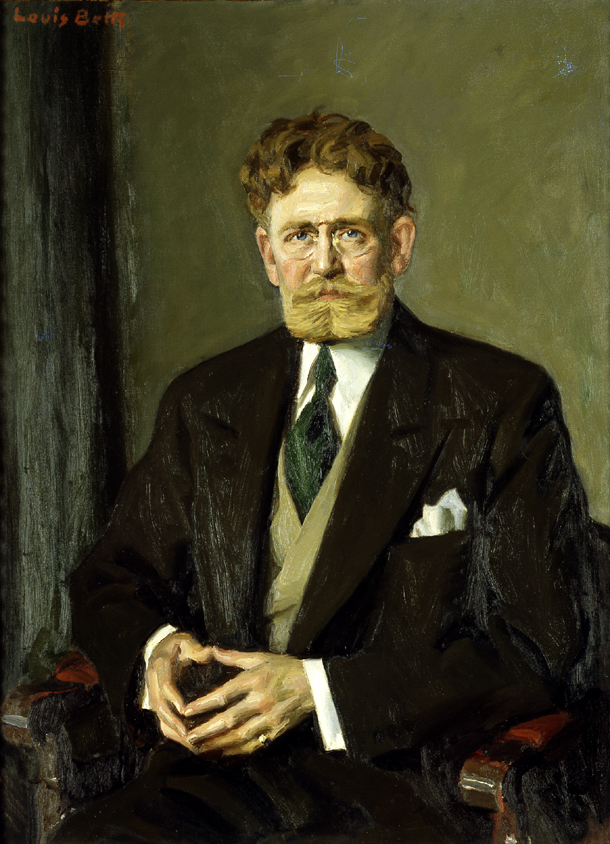

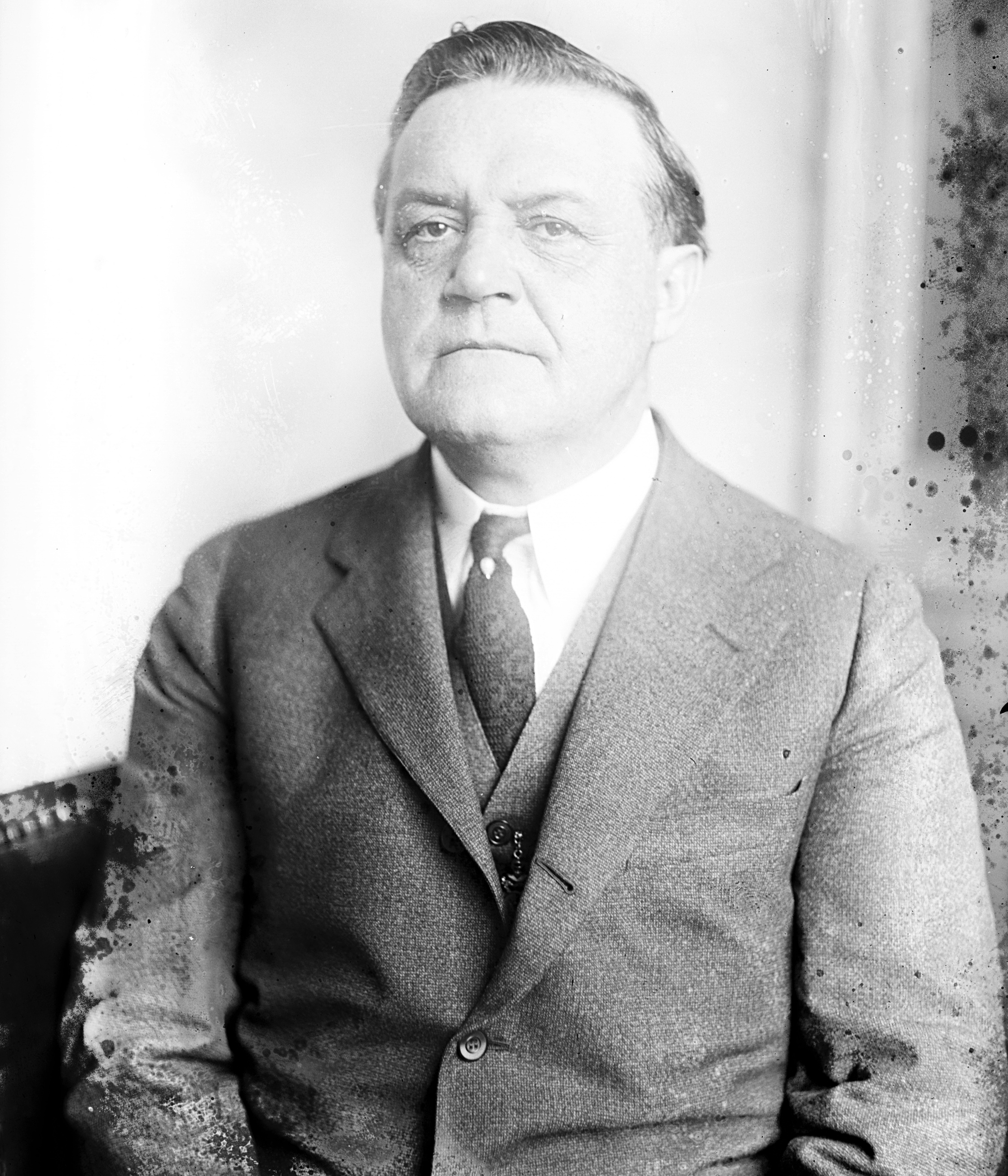
| Nominee | J. Hamilton Lewis | Frank H. Funk |
| Party | Democratic | Progressive |
| Members' vote | 164 | 22 |
| Percentage | 80.39% | 10.78% |
U.S. senator before election
Shelby Moore Cullom
Republican
Elected U.S. senator
J. Hamilton Lewis
Democratic

On April 12, 1912, five-term Republican incumbent Shelby Moore Cullom lost renomination to Lieutenant Governor of Illinois Lawrence Y. Sherman in the Republican "advisory" primary, in which the voters expressed their preference for senator, but the decision was not binding on the General Assembly, which made the actual choice. Cullom had suffered politically over his support for the other Illinois senator, William Lorimer, who was embroiled in a scandal over alleged bribery in his 1909 election to the Senate.

After his defeat, Cullom withdrew his name from consideration by the General Assembly.

The Illinois General Assembly eventually elected the Democratic nominee, Congressman J. Hamilton Lewis, on March 26, 1913, who had also won the Democratic advisory primary, as the sole candidate on the ballot.

Illinois legislative vote, class 2 (March 26, 1913)
| Party | Candidate | Votes | % |
|---|---|---|---|
| Democratic | J. Hamilton Lewis | 164 | 80.39% |
| Progressive | Frank H. Funk | 22 | 10.78% |
| Republican | Lawrence Y. Sherman | 9 | 4.41% |
| Independent | Abstaining | 5 | 2.45% |
| Socialist | Bernard Berlyn | 4 | 1.96% |
| Democratic gain from Republican | | | |

=== Illinois (special) ===
Illinois special election (class 3)
- March 26, 1913
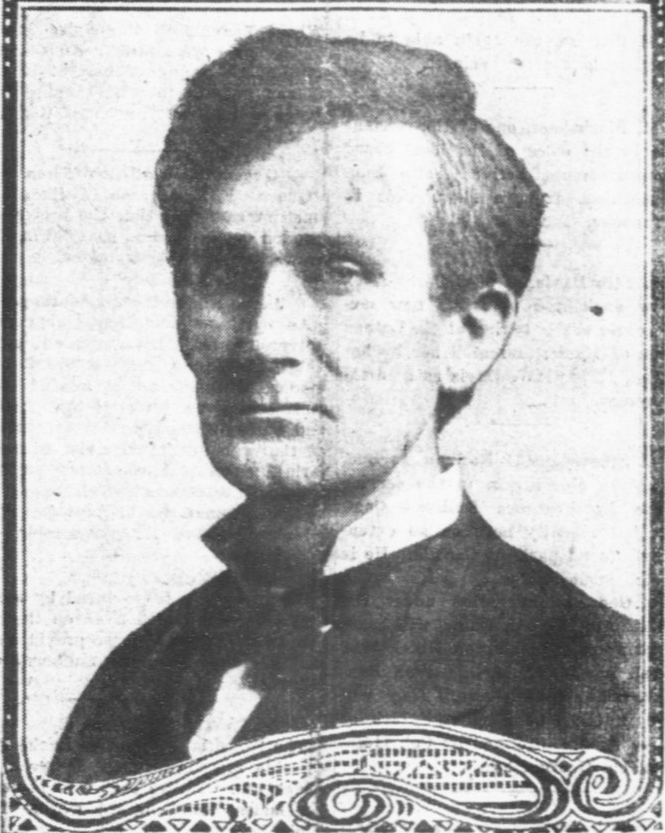

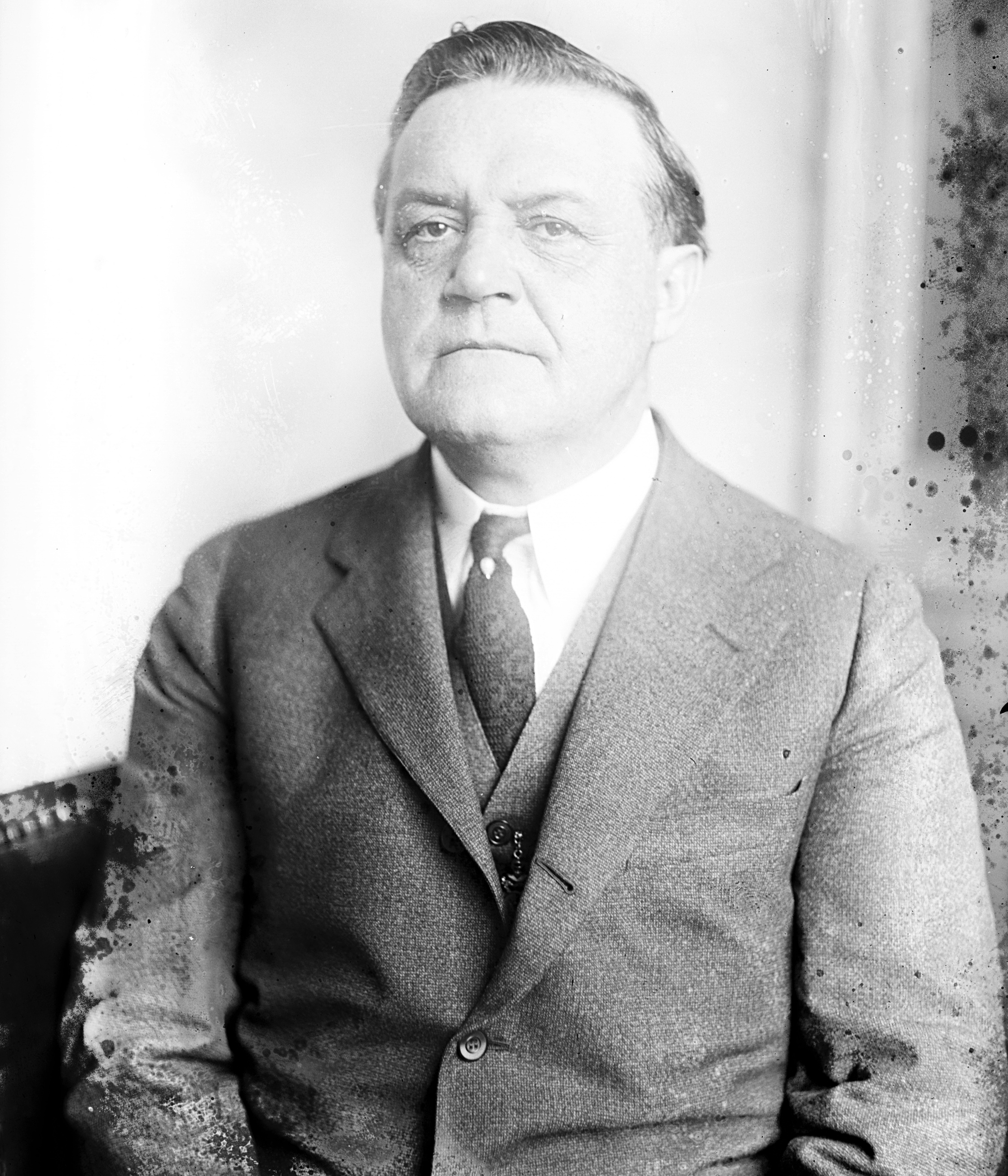
| Nominee | Lawrence Y. Sherman | Charles Boeschenstein |
| Party | Republican | Democratic |
| Members' vote | 143 | 25 |
| Percentage | 70.10% | 12.26% |
| Nominee | Frank H. Funk |
| Party | Progressive |
| Members' vote | 22 |
| Percentage | 10.78% |
U.S. senator before election
Vacant
Elected U.S. senator
Lawrence Y. Sherman
Republican

Three months after the primary in which Sherman defeated Cullom, the U.S. Senate invalidated Lorimer's 1909 election and declared the seat vacant. The Illinois Attorney General, William H. Stead, determined that the General Assembly had failed to properly elect Lorimer in 1909, and so the governor could not appoint a replacement. As a result, the General Assembly had a second Senate seat to fill.

Illinois special legislative vote, class 3 (March 26, 1913)
| Party | Candidate | Votes | % |
|---|---|---|---|
| Republican | Lawrence Y. Sherman | 143 | 70.10 |
| Democratic | Charles Boeschenstein | 25 | 12.26 |
| Progressive | Frank H. Funk | 22 | 10.78 |
| Independent | Abstaining | 9 | 4.41 |
| Socialist | McDonald | 4 | 1.96 |
| Democratic | John Fitzpatrick | 1 | 0.49 |
| Republican gain from Vacant | | | |

== Iowa ==
Iowa election
- January 21, 1913
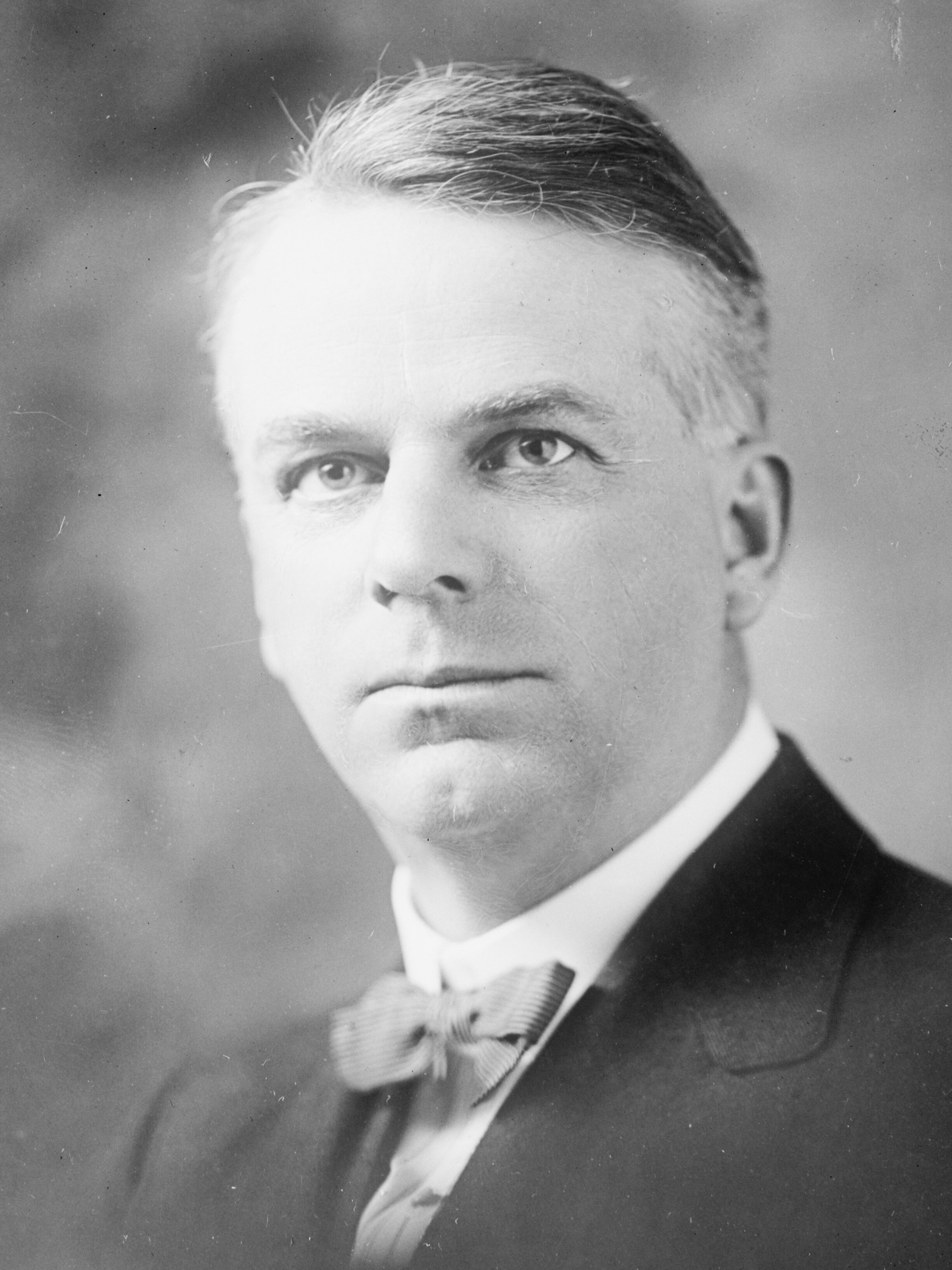

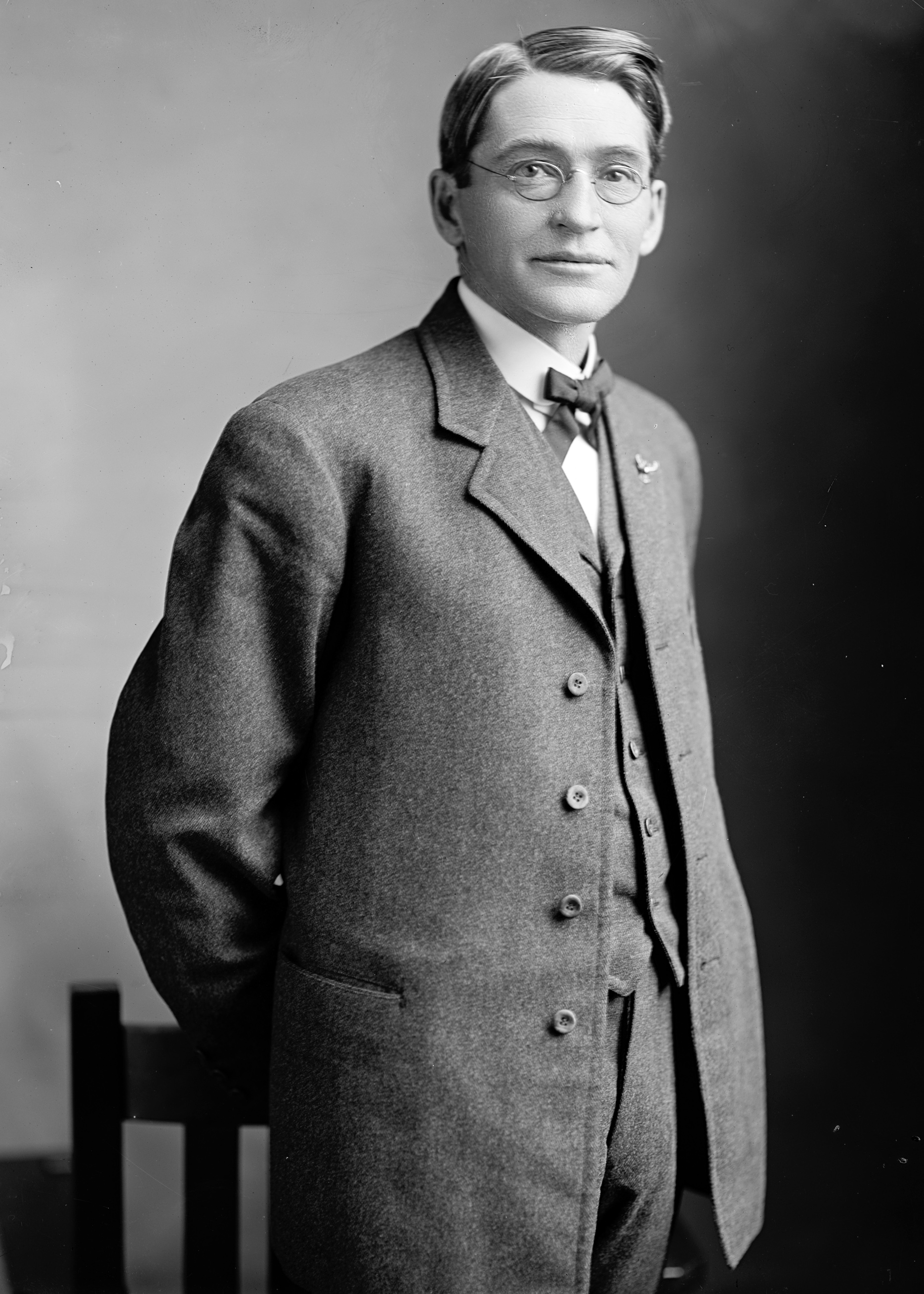
| Nominee | William S. Kenyon | Daniel W. Hamilton |
| Party | Republican | Democratic |
| Members' vote | 91 | 58 |
[[List of United States senators from {{{country}}}|U.S. senator]] before election
William S. Kenyon
Republican
Elected U.S. senator
William S. Kenyon
Republican

Incumbent Republican William S. Kenyon, who had just won a 1911 special election to the seat, was easily re-elected by the Iowa General Assembly over Democratic former congressman Daniel W. Hamilton.

Iowa legislative vote (in Iowa Senate)
| Party | Candidate | Votes | % |
|---|---|---|---|
| Republican | William S. Kenyon (incumbent) | 29 | 61.70% |
| Democratic | Daniel W. Hamilton | 18 | 38.30% |

Iowa legislative vote (in Iowa House)
| Party | Candidate | Votes | % |
|---|---|---|---|
| Republican | William S. Kenyon (incumbent) | 62 | 60.78% |
| Democratic | Daniel W. Hamilton | 40 | 39.22% |
| Republican hold | | | |

== Kansas ==
Kansas election
- January 29, 1913
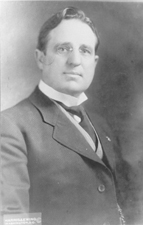

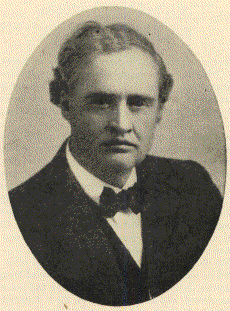
| Nominee | William H. Thompson | W. R. Stubbs |
| Party | Democratic | Republican |
| Electoral vote | 160 | 3 |
| Popular vote | 172,601 | 151,647 |
| Percentage | 49.34% | 43.35% |
- County results Thompson: 30–40% 40–50% 50–60% 60–70% 70–80% Stubbs: 40–50% 50–60% 60–70%
U.S. senator before election
Charles Curtis
Republican
Elected U.S. senator
William H. Thompson
Democratic

One-term incumbent Republican (and future vice president) Charles Curtis lost renomination to Governor of Kansas Walter R. Stubbs, who then lost the general election to Democratic Judge William H. Thompson as Democrats took control of the Kansas Legislature in the 1912 state elections.

1912 Kansas popular election in Kansas
| Party | Candidate | Votes | % |
|---|---|---|---|
| Democratic | William H. Thompson | 172,601 | 49.34% |
| Republican | W. R. Stubbs | 151,647 | 43.35% |
| Socialist | Allan W. Ricker | 25,610 | 7.32% |
| Total votes | | 349,858 | 100.00% |

Kansas Senate election, January 28, 1913
| Party | Candidate | Votes | % |
|---|---|---|---|
| Democratic | William H. Thompson | 40 | 100% |
| Turnout | | 40 | 100.0% |

Kansas House of Representatives election, January 29, 1912
| Party | Candidate | Votes | % |
|---|---|---|---|
| Democratic | William H. Thompson | 120 | 96.8% |
| Republican | W. R. Stubbs | 3 | 2.4% |
| Progressive | Henry J. Allen | 1 | 0.8% |
| Turnout | | 124 | 99.2% |
| Democratic gain from Republican | | | |

Thompson would only serve one term, losing re-election in 1918. Until Democrat Adam Hamilton's election to the Senate in 2026, this was the last time that a Democrat won the Class 2 Senate seat in Kansas, and the only election where Democrats won the popular vote in this Senate seat. Until Hamilton's victory, this was the longest contemporary winning streak of either party for a single Senate seat.

Curtis' political career, meanwhile, would rebound, as he was elected to Kansas' other US Senate seat, first by defeating Kansas' senior senator Joseph L. Bristow in the Republican primary, and then winning re-election nonconsecutively to the U.S Senate by a very narrow margin over two opponents, becoming the first Kansan to be popularly elected to the U.S Senate. Curtis would serve in the Senate for three terms before resigning to become U.S. vice president in March 1929, the first Native American to serve in that office.

== Kentucky ==
Kentucky election
- January 16, 1912
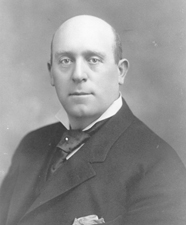

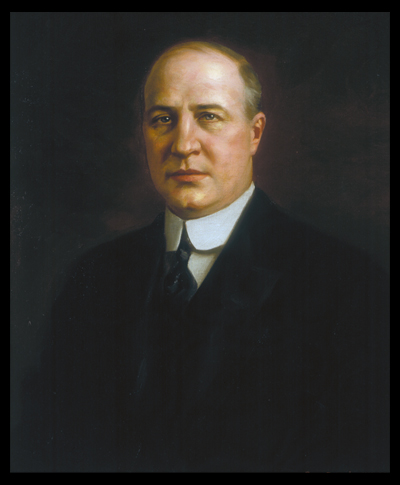
| Nominee | Ollie James | Edwin P. Morrow |
| Party | Democratic | Republican |
| Senate ballot | 31 (83.8%) | 6 (16.2%) |
| House ballot | 74 (76.3%) | 23 (23.7%) |
- Blue denotes members voting for James and red denotes those voting for Morrow.
U.S. senator before election
Thomas H. Paynter
Democratic
Elected U.S. senator
Ollie James
Democratic

One-term Democrat Thomas H. Paynter retired, and Democratic Representative Ollie James was easily elected on January 16, 1912.

Kentucky legislative vote (in Kentucky Senate), January 9, 1912
| Party | Candidate | Votes | % |
|---|---|---|---|
| Democratic | Ollie James | 31 | 88.6% |
| Republican | Edwin P. Morrow | 4 | 11.4% |

Kentucky legislative vote (in Kentucky House of Representatives), January 9, 1912
| Party | Candidate | Votes | % |
|---|---|---|---|
| Democratic | Ollie James | 74 | 75.5% |
| Republican | Edwin P. Morrow | 24 | 24.6% |

The legislature formally elected James a second time January 16, 1912, to comply with a federal rule requiring an election on the second Tuesday after the meeting of the legislature.

== Louisiana ==
Louisiana senators

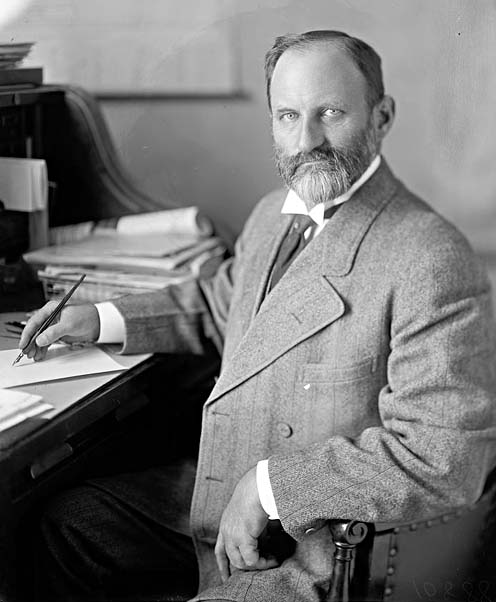
Joseph E. Ransdell
Class 2: starting March 4, 1913

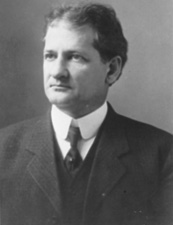
Robert F. Broussard
Class 3: starting March 4, 1915

Louisiana held two elections on May 21, 1912: an election for the class 2 term that would begin March 4, 1913, and an election for the class 3 term that would begin March 4, 1915.

=== Louisiana (regular, class 2) ===
In the class 2 seat, Democrat Murphy J. Foster lost renomination to fellow Democrat Joseph E. Ransdell, who later was elected unopposed to the seat.

=== Louisiana (regular, class 3) ===
In the class 3 seat, Democrat John Thornton retired. Fellow Democrat Robert F. Broussard was elected unopposed, but would have to wait until the term began on March 4, 1915.

== Maine ==
Five-term incumbent Republican William P. Frye had died on August 8, 1911, and Democrat Obadiah Gardner was appointed on September 23, 1911, to continue the term, pending a special election. In this election cycle, Gardner first won the election to finish the term, and then lost re-election to the next term.

=== Maine (special) ===
Maine special election
- April 2, 1912
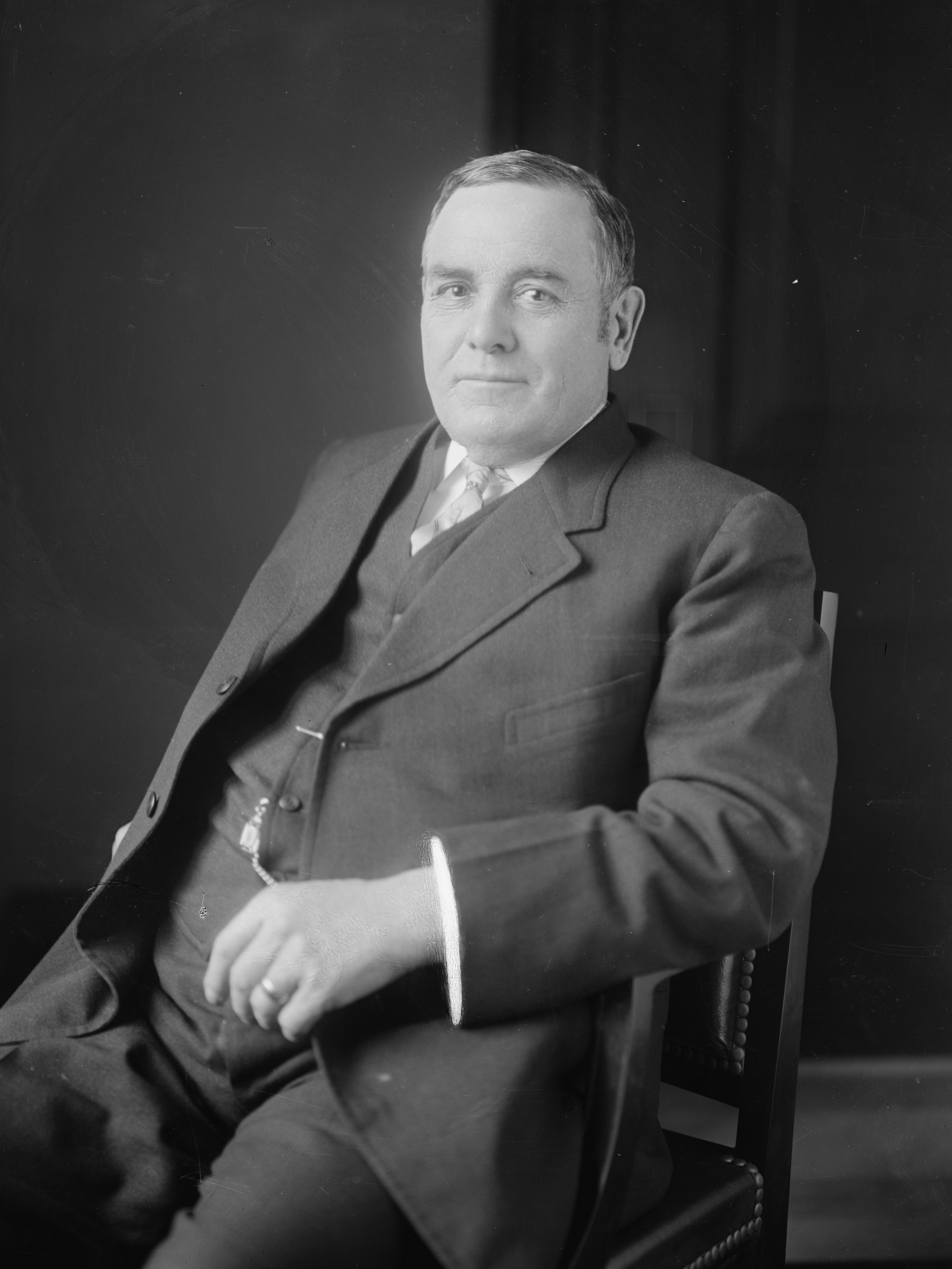

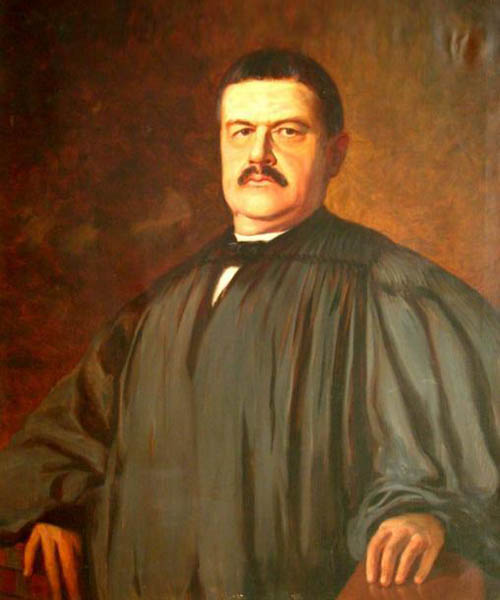
| Nominee | Obadiah Gardner | Frederick A. Powers |
| Party | Democratic | Republican |
| Members' vote | 98 | 56 |
| Percentage | 66.2% | 33.8% |
U.S. senator before election
Obadiah Gardner
Democratic
Elected U.S. senator
Obadiah Gardner
Democratic

Democratic interim appointee Obadiah Gardner was elected on April 2, 1912, to finish the term ending on March 3, 1913.

Maine Senate vote (April 2, 1912)
| Party | Candidate | Votes | % |
|---|---|---|---|
| Democratic | Obadiah Gardner (incumbent) | 20 | 76.9% |
| Republican | Frederick A. Powers | 6 | 23.1% |

Maine House of Representatives vote (April 2, 1912)
| Party | Candidate | Votes | % |
|---|---|---|---|
| Democratic | Obadiah Gardner (incumbent) | 78 | 60.9% |
| Republican | Frederick A. Powers | 50 | 39.1% |
| Democratic hold | | | |

=== Maine (regular) ===
Maine general election
- January 15, 1913
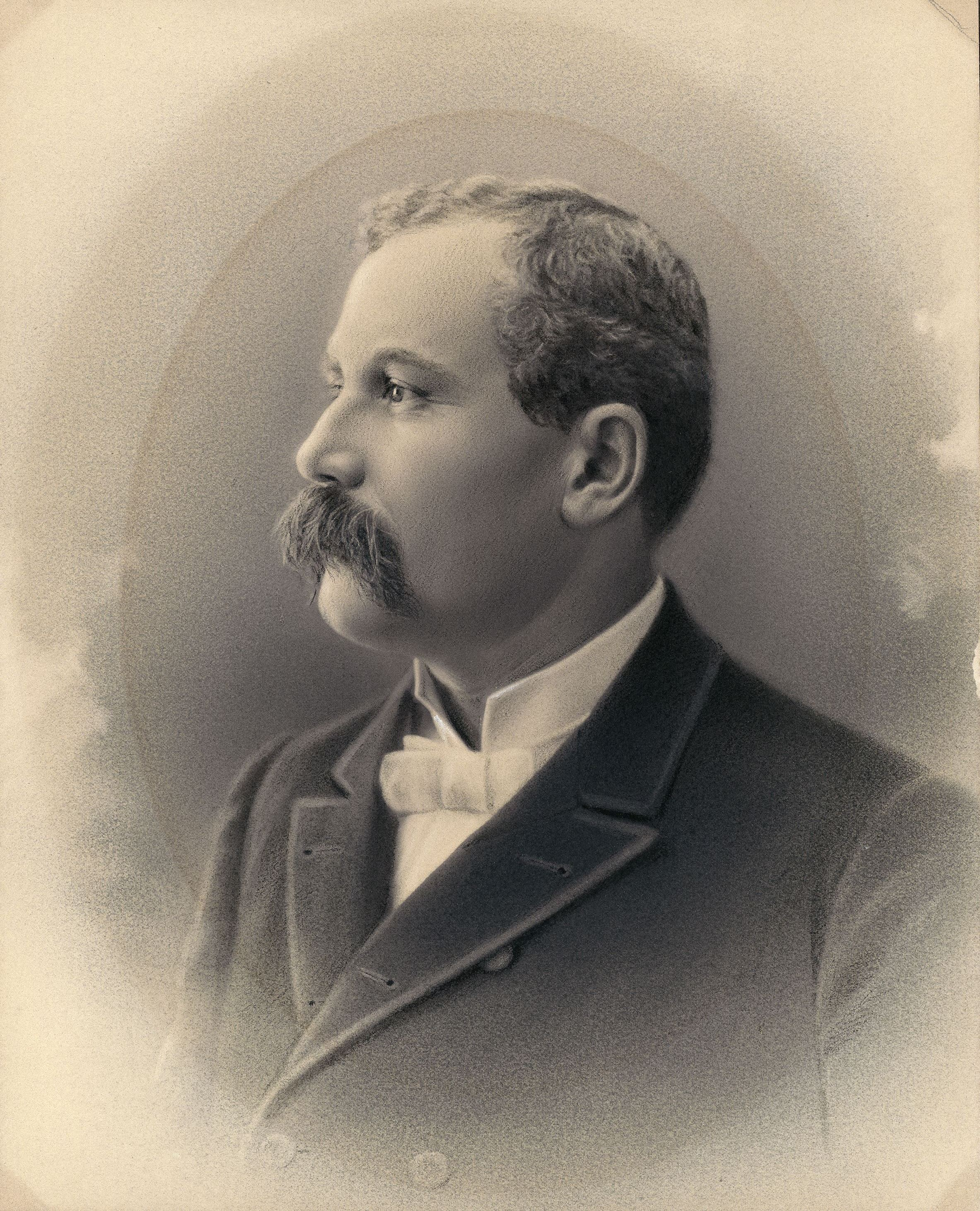

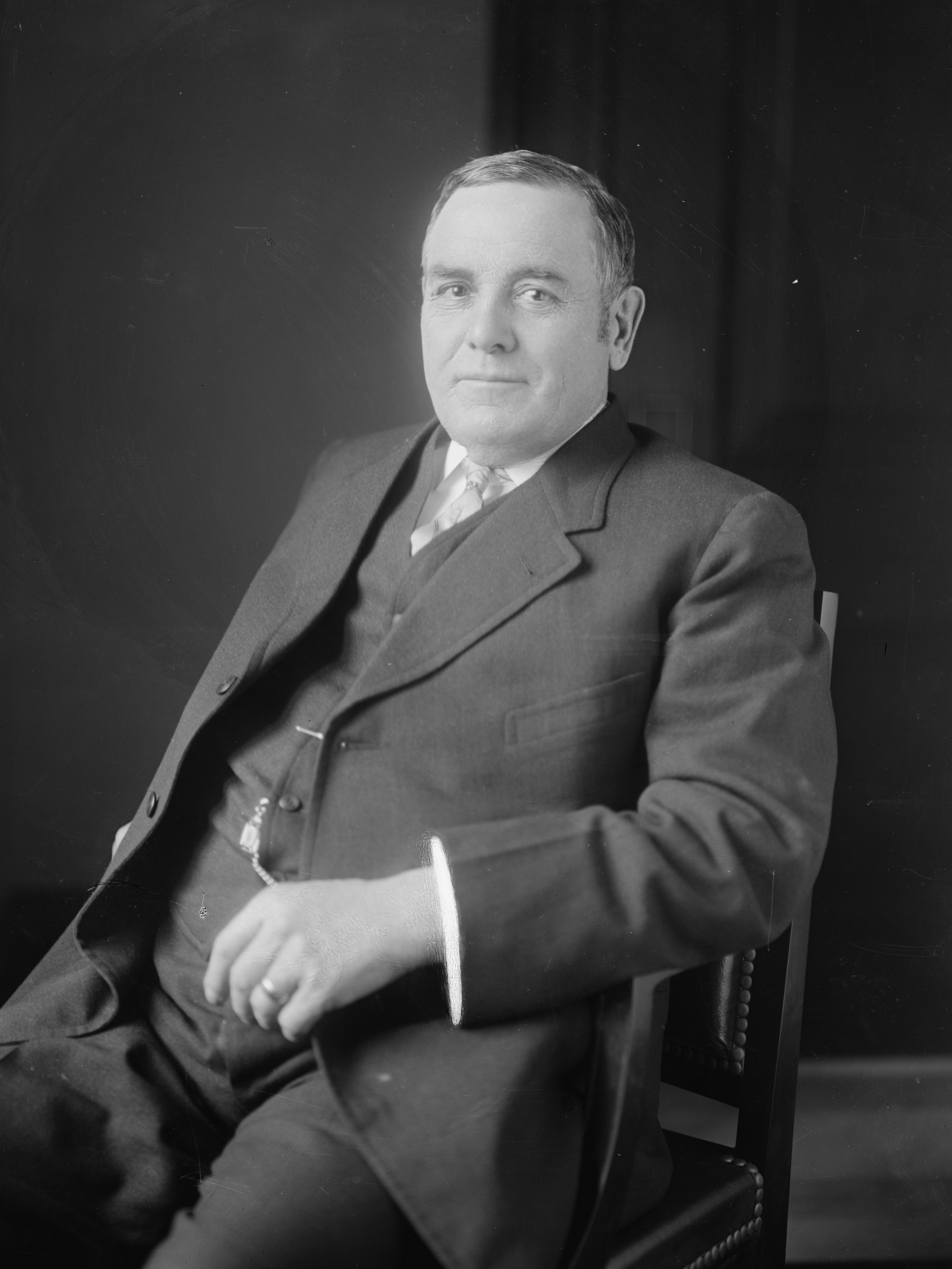
| Nominee | Edwin C. Burleigh | Obadiah Gardner |
| Party | Republican | Democratic |
| Members' vote | 91 | 82 |
| Percentage | 50.6% | 45.6% |
U.S. senator before election
Edwin C. Burleigh
Republican
Elected U.S. senator
Obadiah Gardner
Democratic

Democrat Obadiah Gardner lost re-election on January 15, 1913, to Republican Edwin C. Burleigh for the term starting on March 4, 1913.

"There was no choice in the separate balloting on January 14. The next day in joint assembly, [Burleigh was elected]."

Maine Legislature vote (January 15, 1913)
| Party | Candidate | Votes | % |
|---|---|---|---|
| Republican | Edwin C. Burleigh (incumbent) | 91 | 50.6% |
| Democratic | Obadiah Gardner | 82 | 45.6% |
| Progressive | E.M. Thompson | 7 | 3.9% |
| Republican gain from Democratic | | | |

== Maryland (special) ==
Maryland special election
- November 4, 1913
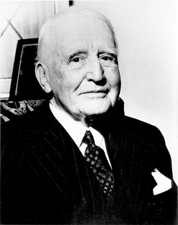

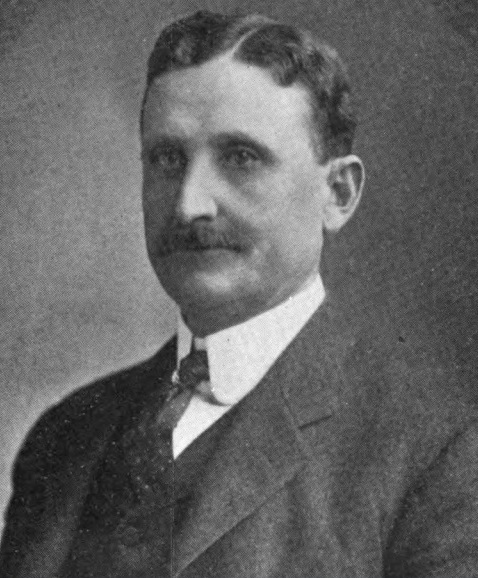
| Nominee | Blair Lee | Thomas Parran Sr. |
| Party | Democratic | Republican |
| Popular vote | 112,485 | 73,300 |
| Percentage | 56.75% | 36.98% |
- County results Parran: 40–50% 50–60% 60–70% Lee: 30–40% 40–50% 50–60% 60–70% 70–80%
U.S. senator before election
William P. Jackson
Republican
Elected U.S. senator
Blair Lee
Democratic

Democrat Isidor Rayner died on November 25, 1912, and Republican William P. Jackson was appointed to continue the term, pending a special election.

Democratic state senator Blair Lee was elected on November 4, 1913.

1913 Maryland U.S. Senate special election
| Party | Candidate | Votes | % |
|---|---|---|---|
| Democratic | Blair Lee | 112,485 | 56.75% |
| Republican | Thomas Parran Sr. | 73,300 | 36.98% |
| Progressive | George Wellington | 7,033 | 3.55% |
| Socialist | Robert Fields | 2,982 | 1.5% |
| Prohibition | Finley Hendrickson | 2,405 | 1.21% |
| Turnout | | 198,205 | |
| Democratic gain from Republican | | | |

Lee presented his credentials to serve as senator on December 5, 1913, but he did not qualify until January 28, 1914, because Jackson claimed that "since [Jackson] had been appointed under the original constitutional provision, [Jackson] was entitled to hold his seat until the regularly scheduled adjournment date of the Maryland state assembly." The Senate considered Jackson's challenge, but eventually rejected it and seated Lee.

Lee would only serve this one term, as he lost renomination in 1916.

== Massachusetts ==
Massachusetts election
- January 14, 1913
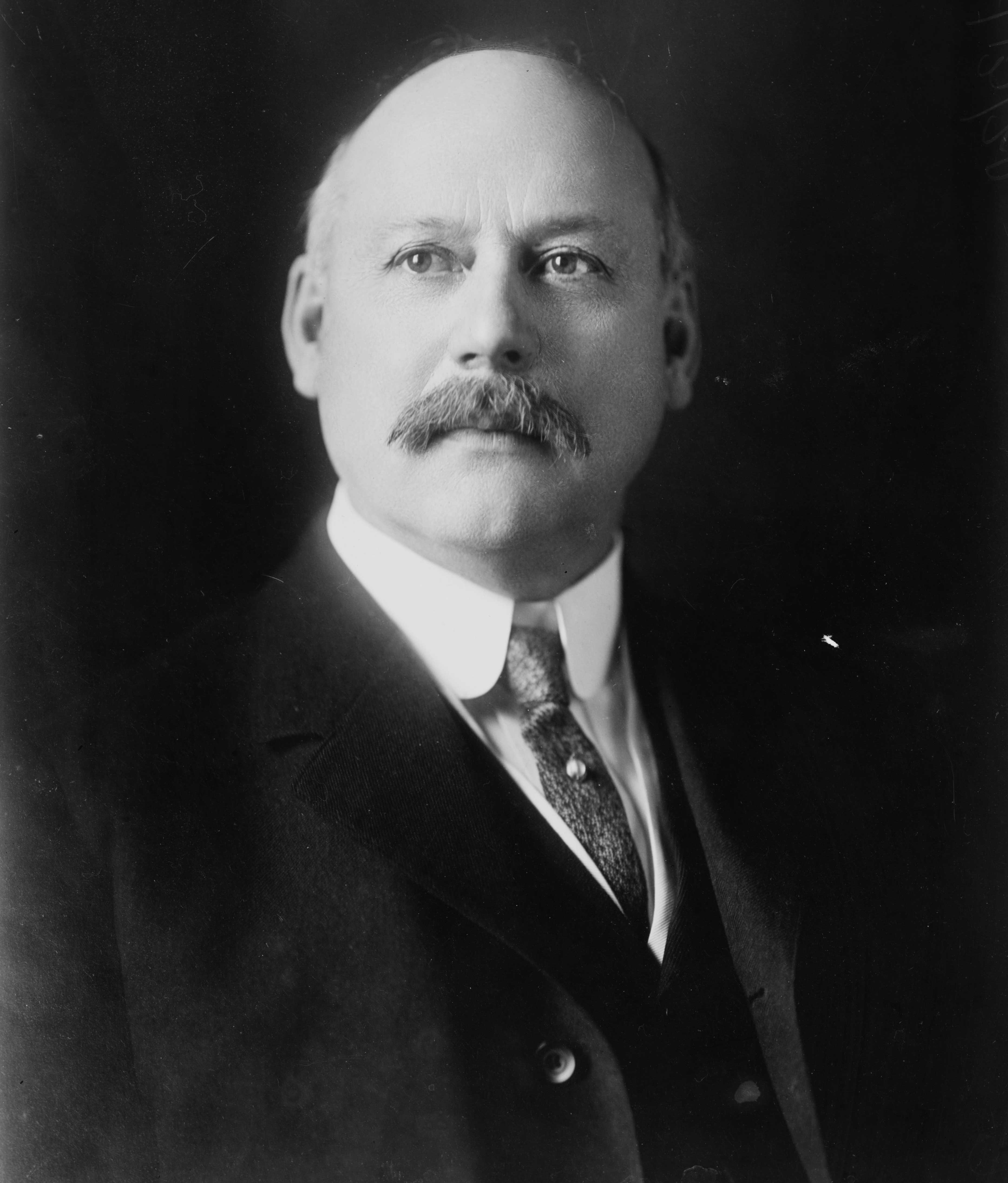
| Nominee | John W. Weeks | Sherman L. Whipple |
| Party | Republican | Democratic |
| Members' vote | 160 | 80 |
| Percentage | 58.82% | 29.41% |
U.S. senator before election
Winthrop M. Crane
Republican
Elected U.S. Senator
John W. Weeks
Republican

Republican Winthrop M. Crane, who was first appointed in 1904, retired. Republican congressman from Newton, Massachusetts, John W. Weeks, was elected on January 14, 1913, to succeed him. Republican Eben Sumner Draper had been considered a candidate for the seat, but the Republican party, then under the control of its hardline conservative faction (and in control of the legislature), chose Weeks instead.

1913 Republican nominating caucus
| Party | Candidate | Votes | % |
|---|---|---|---|
| Republican | John W. Weeks | 97 | 60.25% |
| Republican | Samuel Walker McCall | 57 | 35.40% |
| Republican | Curtis Guild Jr. | 5 | 3.11% |
| Republican | George P. Lawrence | 1 | 0.62% |
| Republican | Robert Luce | 1 | 0.62% |
| Total votes | | 161 | 100.00% |

Massachusetts legislative vote (in Massachusetts Senate)
| Party | Candidate | Votes | % |
|---|---|---|---|
| Republican | John W. Weeks | 26 | 66.67% |
| Democratic | Sherman L. Whipple | 11 | 28.21% |
| Democratic | John A. Keliher | 1 | 2.56% |
| Democratic | Joseph C. Pelletier | 1 | 2.56% |

Massachusetts legislative vote (in Massachusetts House of Representatives)
| Party | Candidate | Votes | % |
|---|---|---|---|
| Republican | John W. Weeks | 134 | 57.51% |
| Democratic | Sherman L. Whipple | 69 | 29.61% |
| Progressive | John Graham Brooks | 5 | 2.15% |
| Democratic | John F. Meaney | 3 | 1.29% |
| Democratic | James B. Carroll | 3 | 1.29% |
| Democratic | Charles A. DeCourey | 3 | 1.29% |
| Democratic | Charles Sumner Hamlin | 2 | 0.86% |
| Democratic | John A. Thayer | 2 | 0.86% |
| Democratic | John F. Fitzgerald | 2 | 0.86% |
| Republican | Curtis Guild Jr. | 1 | 0.43% |
| Republican | Robert Luce | 1 | 0.43% |
| Democratic | Philip J. O'Connell | 1 | 0.43% |
| Unknown | Olney | 1 | 0.43% |
| Democratic | Joseph Henry O'Neil | 1 | 0.43% |
| Unknown | Peters | 1 | 0.43% |
| Unknown | Pratt | 1 | 0.43% |
| Unknown | Sawyer | 1 | 0.43% |
| Unknown | Sweeney | 1 | 0.43% |
| Unknown | Williams | 1 | 0.43% |

Weeks would only serve for one six-year term. He would lose re-election in 1918 to Democrat David I. Walsh.

== Michigan ==
Michigan election
- January 14, 1913
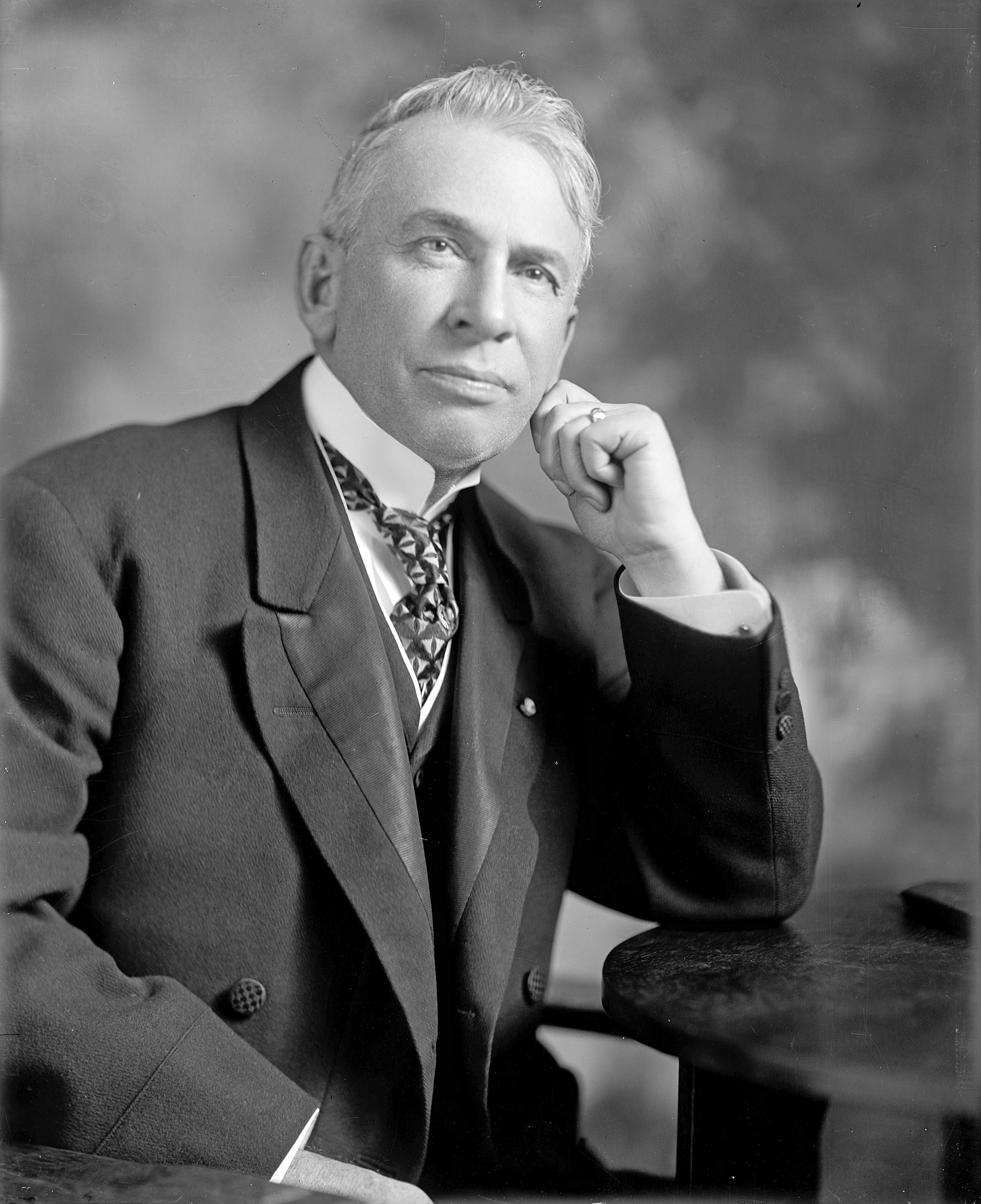

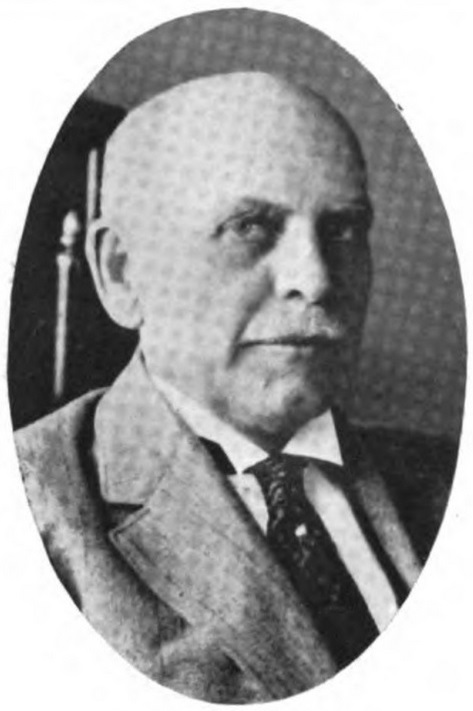
| Nominee | William A. Smith | Alfred Lucking | Theodore Joslin |
| Party | Republican | Democratic | Progressive |
| Members' vote | 74 | 41 | 17 |
| Percentage | 56.06% | 31.06% | 12.88% |
U.S. senator before election
William A. Smith
Republican
Elected U.S. Senator
William A. Smith
Republican

Two-term Republican William A. Smith, whose Senate tenure began weeks before his first full term began, was re-elected on January 14, 1913.

- ✓ William A. Smith (Republican) 74 votes
- Alfred Lucking (Democratic) 41 votes
- Theodore Joslin (Progressive) 17 votes

He would retire after this term.

== Minnesota ==
Minnesota election
- January 21, 1913
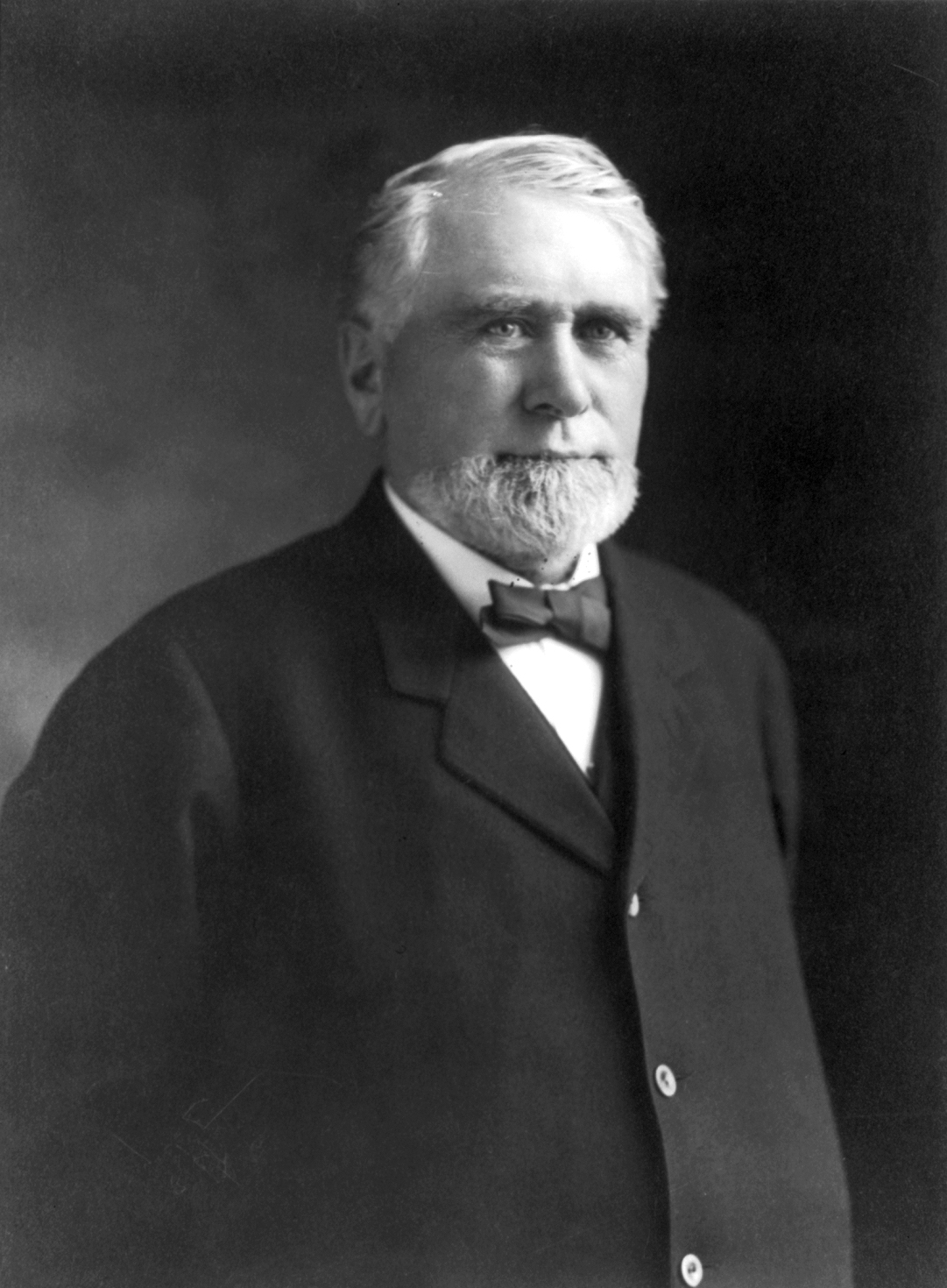

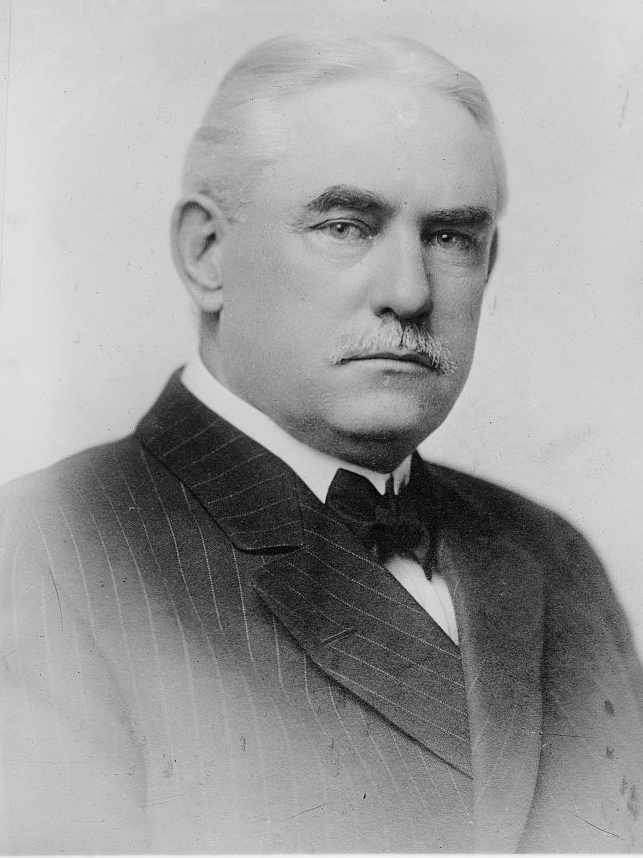
| Nominee | Knute Nelson | Daniel W. Lawler |
| Party | Republican | Democratic |
| Electoral vote | 178 | 0 |
| Popular vote | 173,072 | 102,541 |
| Percentage | 62.80% | 37.20% |
- County results Nelson: 50–60% 60–70% 70–80% 80–90% Lawler: 50–60% 60–70%
U.S. senator before election
Knute Nelson
Republican
Elected U.S. Senator
Knute Nelson
Republican

Three-term Republican Knute Nelson was overwhelmingly supported in a 1912 popular election.

1912 Minnesota popular vote, class 2
| Party | Candidate | Votes | % |
|---|---|---|---|
| Republican | Knute Nelson | 173,072 | 62.80% |
| Democratic | Daniel W. Lawler | 102,541 | 37.20% |
| Total votes | | 275,613 | 100.00% |

The Minnesota Legislature unanimously ratified the popular vote on January 21, 1913.

Minnesota Senate vote, class 2
| Party | Candidate | Votes | % |
|---|---|---|---|
| Republican | Knute Nelson | 61 | 100% |

Minnesota House of Representatives vote, class 2
| Party | Candidate | Votes | % |
|---|---|---|---|
| Republican | Knute Nelson | 117 | 100% |

Nelson would be re-elected again in 1918 to a fifth term, before his death in 1923.

== Mississippi ==
Mississippi election
- August 1, 1911
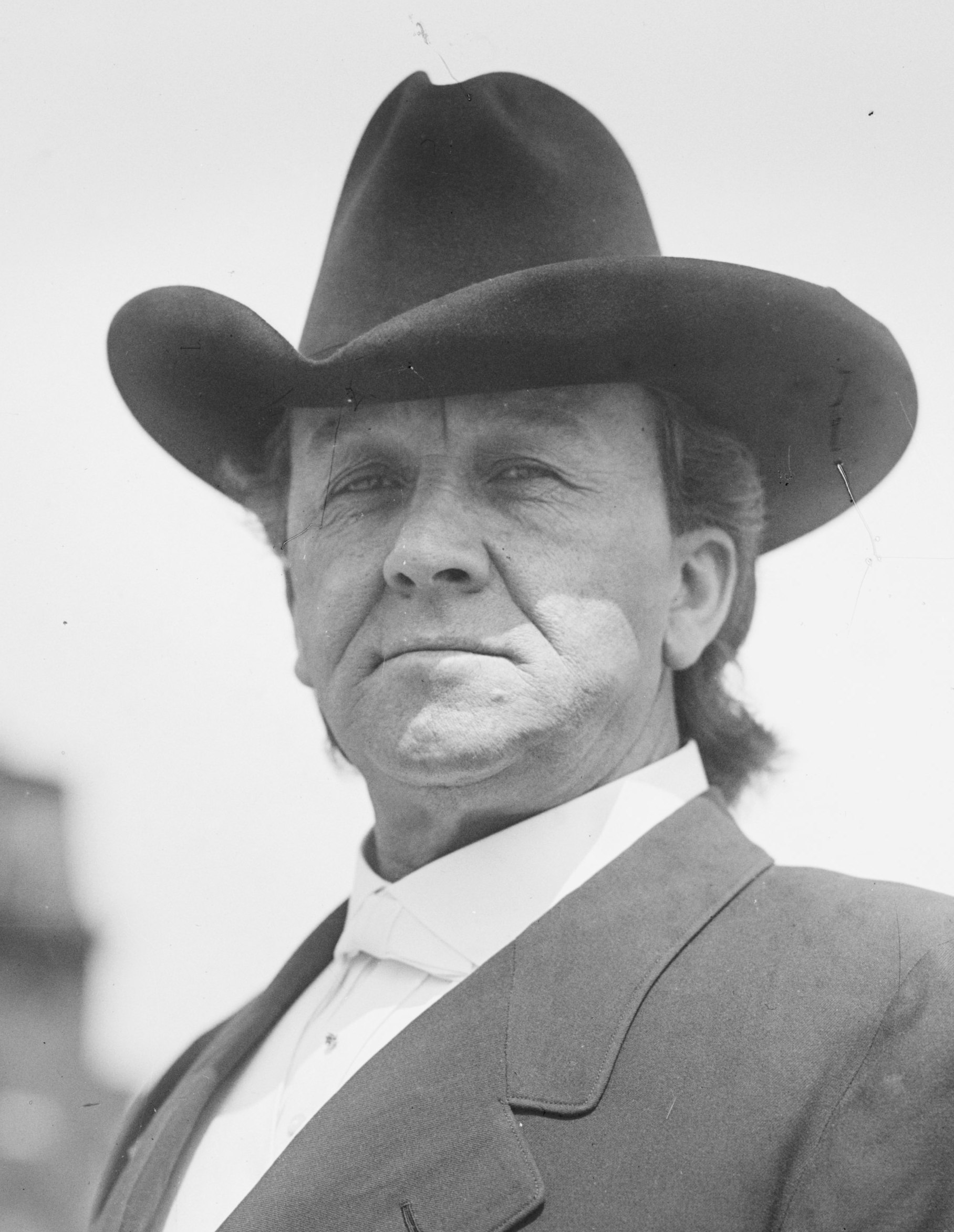

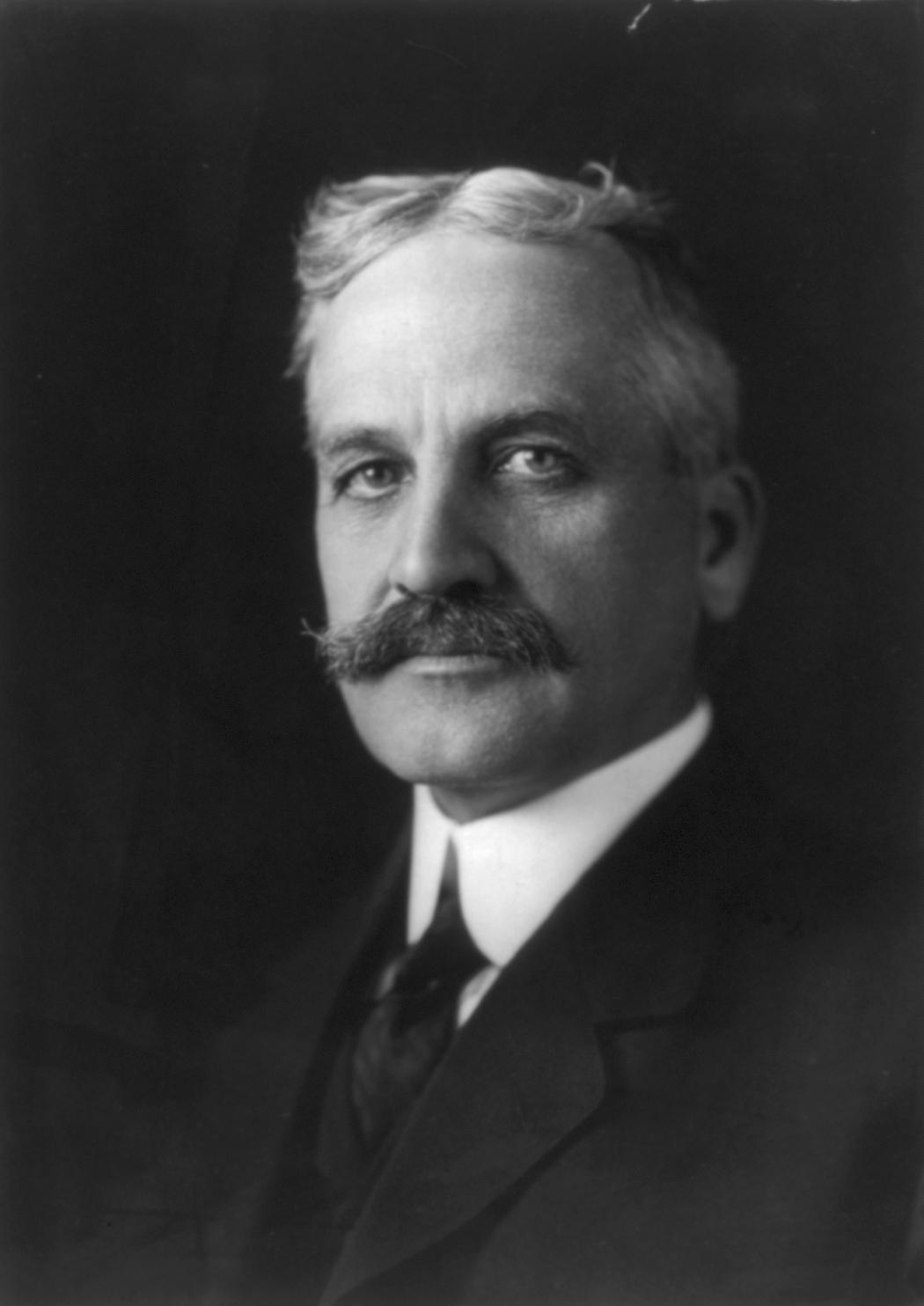
| Nominee | James K. Vardaman | C. H. Alexander |
| Party | Democratic | Democratic |
| Popular vote | 79,380 | 31,300 |
| Percentage | 60.04% | 23.68% |
| Nominee | LeRoy Percy |
| Party | Democratic |
| Popular vote | 21,521 |
| Percentage | 16.28% |
- County results Vardaman: 30–40% 40–50% 50–60% 60–70% 70–80% Percy: 40–50% 50–60% 60–70% 70–80%
U.S. senator before election
LeRoy Percy
Democratic
Elected U.S. senator
James K. Vardaman
Democratic

One-term Democrat LeRoy Percy lost renomination in mid-1911 to white supremacist James K. Vardaman, who was elected on January 16, 1912, to the seat, unopposed.

Percy had won in 1910 (to finish a vacant term) despite Vardaman's support of a plurality of legislators (all white). The fractured remainder sought to thwart his extreme racial policies. A majority united behind Percy to block Vardaman's election. Percy had advocated education for blacks and worked to improve race relations by appealing to the planters' sense of noblesse oblige. Disenfranchisement of blacks made the Democratic primary the deciding competitive race for state and local offices in Mississippi.

In this rematch, Vardaman's campaign was managed by Lieutenant Governor of Mississippi (and future senator) Theodore Bilbo, who emphasized class tensions and racial segregation, attacking Percy as a representative of the aristocracy of the state and for taking a progressive stance on race relations.

Vardaman, however, would only serve one term, losing renomination in 1918, primarily due to his vote against entry into World War I.

Mississippi Democratic primary
| Candidate | Votes | % |
|---|---|---|
| James K. Vardaman | 79,380 | 60.04 |
| C. H. Alexander | 31,300 | 23.68 |
| LeRoy Percy | 21,521 | 16.28 |
| Total | 132,201 | 100.00 |

== Montana ==
Montana election
- January 14, 1913
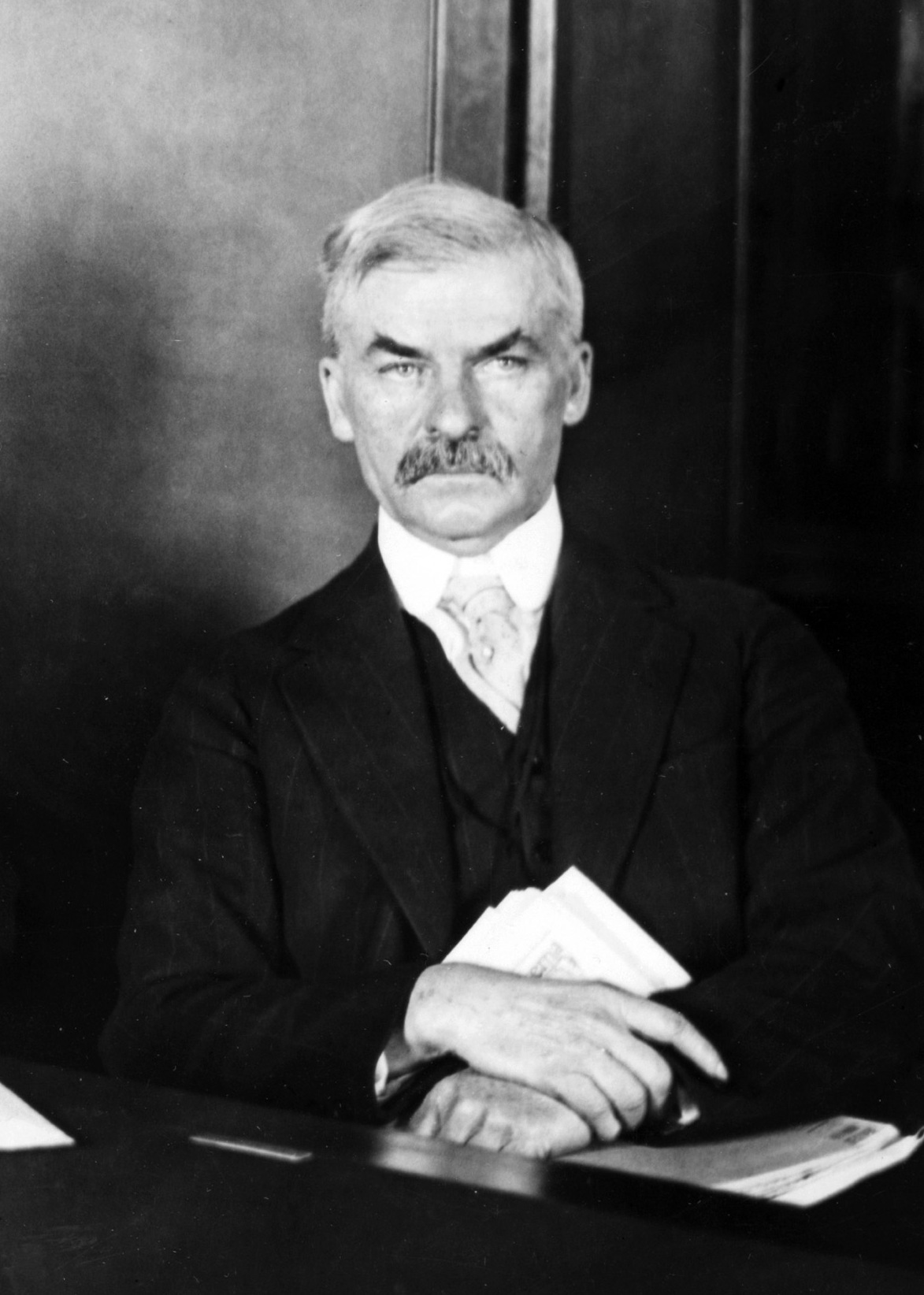

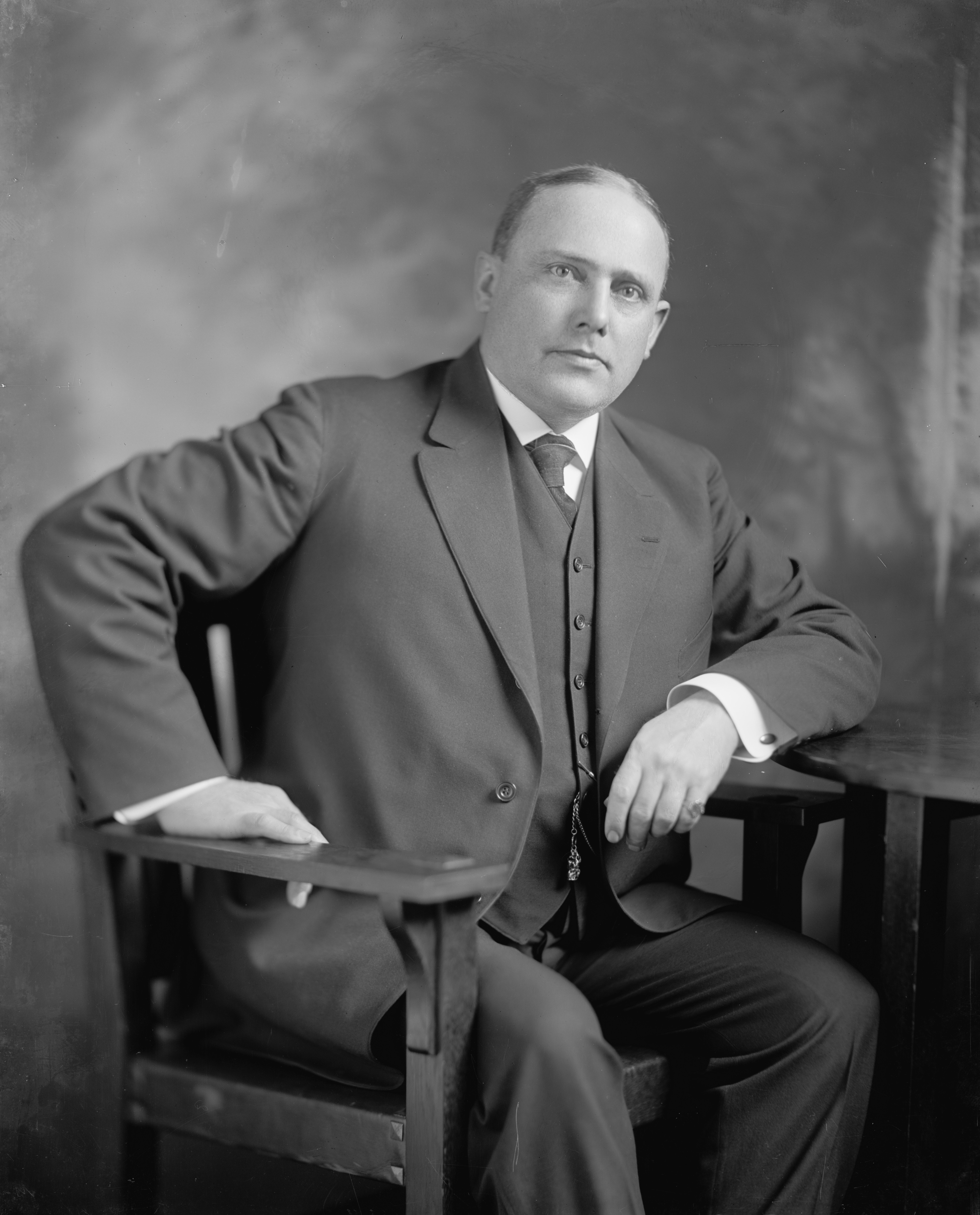
| Nominee | Thomas J. Walsh | Joseph M. Dixon | Henry C. Smith |
| Party | Democratic | Progressive | Republican |
| Electoral vote | Unanimous | 0 | 0 |
| Popular vote | 28,421 | 22,161 | 18,450 |
| Percentage | 41.17% | 32.10% | 26.73% |
- County results Walsh: 30–40% 40–50% 50–60% Dixon: 30–40% 40–50% 50–60% Smith: 40–50% No vote
U.S. senator before election
Joseph M. Dixon
Republican
Elected U.S. Senator
Thomas J. Walsh
Democratic

One-term Republican Joseph M. Dixon ran for re-election as a Progressive, but lost to Democrat Thomas J. Walsh.

Montana popular election (November 5, 1912)
| Party | Candidate | Votes | % |
|---|---|---|---|
| Democratic | Thomas J. Walsh | 28,421 | 41.17% |
| Progressive | Joseph M. Dixon (incumbent) | 22,161 | 32.10% |
| Republican | Henry C. Smith | 18,450 | 26.73% |

The Montana Legislature then unanimously elected Walsh January 14, 1913.

Walsh would be re-elected four more times and serve for 20 years until his death in 1933. Dixon would go on to become governor of Montana from 1921 to 1925.

== Nebraska ==
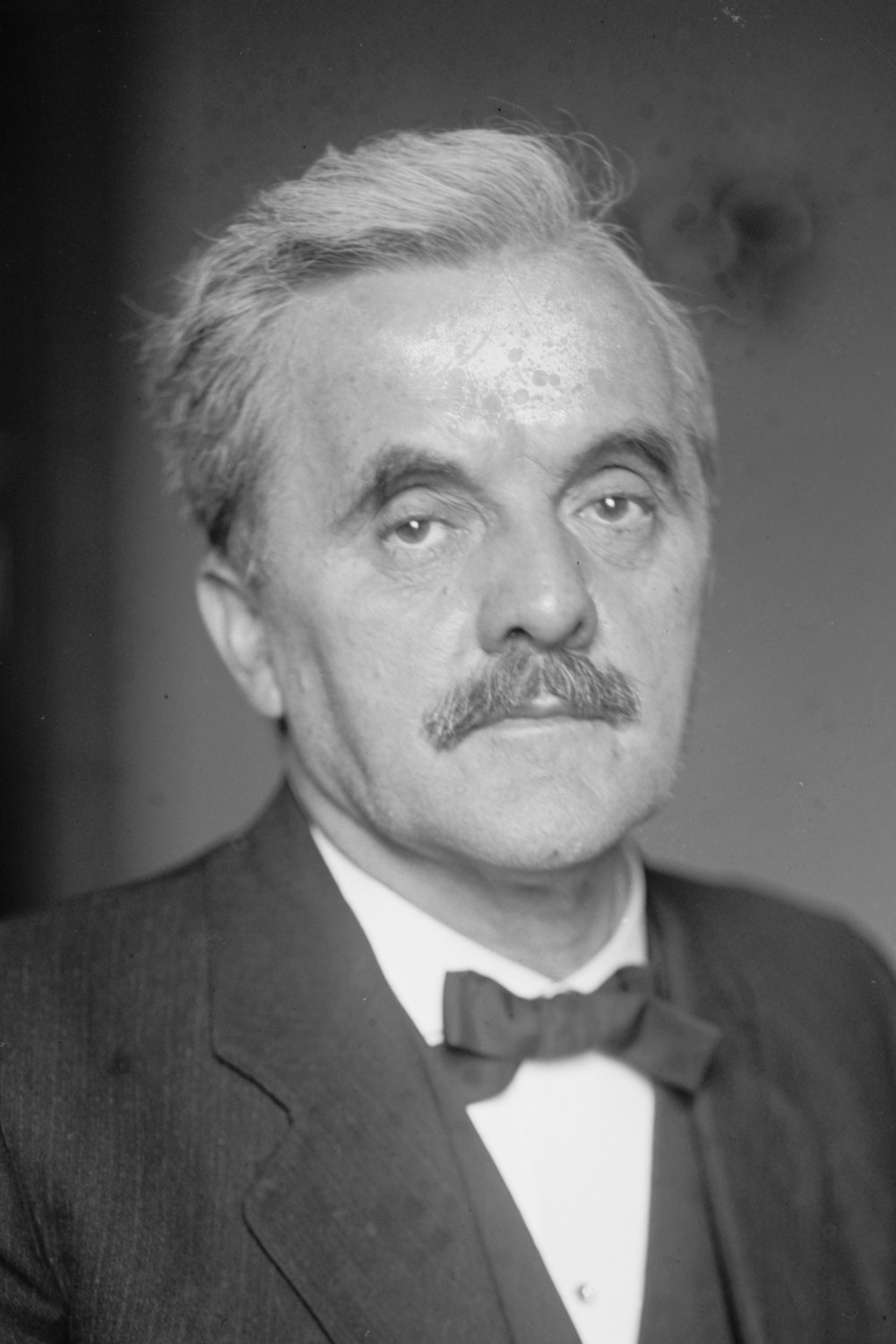
Senator George W. Norris

First-term Republican Norris Brown lost renomination to George W. Norris, who was elected on January 21, 1913.

Nebraska Democratic primary (April 19, 1912)
| Party | Candidate | Votes | % |
|---|---|---|---|
| Democratic | Ashton C. Shallenberger | 27,581 | 57.61% |
| Democratic | William H. Thompson | 11,993 | 25.05% |
| Democratic | Willis E. Reed | 5,244 | 10.95% |
| Democratic | Robert F. Smith | 3,061 | 6.39% |

Nebraska Republican primary (April 19, 1912)
| Party | Candidate | Votes | % |
|---|---|---|---|
| Republican | George W. Norris | 38,893 | 53.98% |
| Republican | Norris Brown (incumbent) | 33,156 | 46.02% |

Nebraska popular vote (November 5, 1912)
| Party | Candidate | Votes | % |
|---|---|---|---|
| Republican | George W. Norris | 126,022 | 52.96% |
| Democratic | Ashton C. Shallenberger | 111,946 | 47.04% |

Despite the Democratic majority, the Nebraska legislature elected Republican Norris unanimously, upholding the popular vote.

"The Democratic Legislature will be called upon to elect a Republican for United States Senator. Ninety-five per cent. [sic] of the candidates for the Legislature, in accordance with the Oregon plan, signed "Statement No. 1," which provides that, in the event of election, they will vote for the candidate for United States Senator who obtains the preference vote of the people. Although Congressman Norris, a Progressive Republican, has won the preference vote, returns indicate that a Democratic legislature has been elected."

Norris would serve for thirty years, winning two more elections as a Republican and one as an independent, but losing re-election in 1942.

== Nevada (special) ==
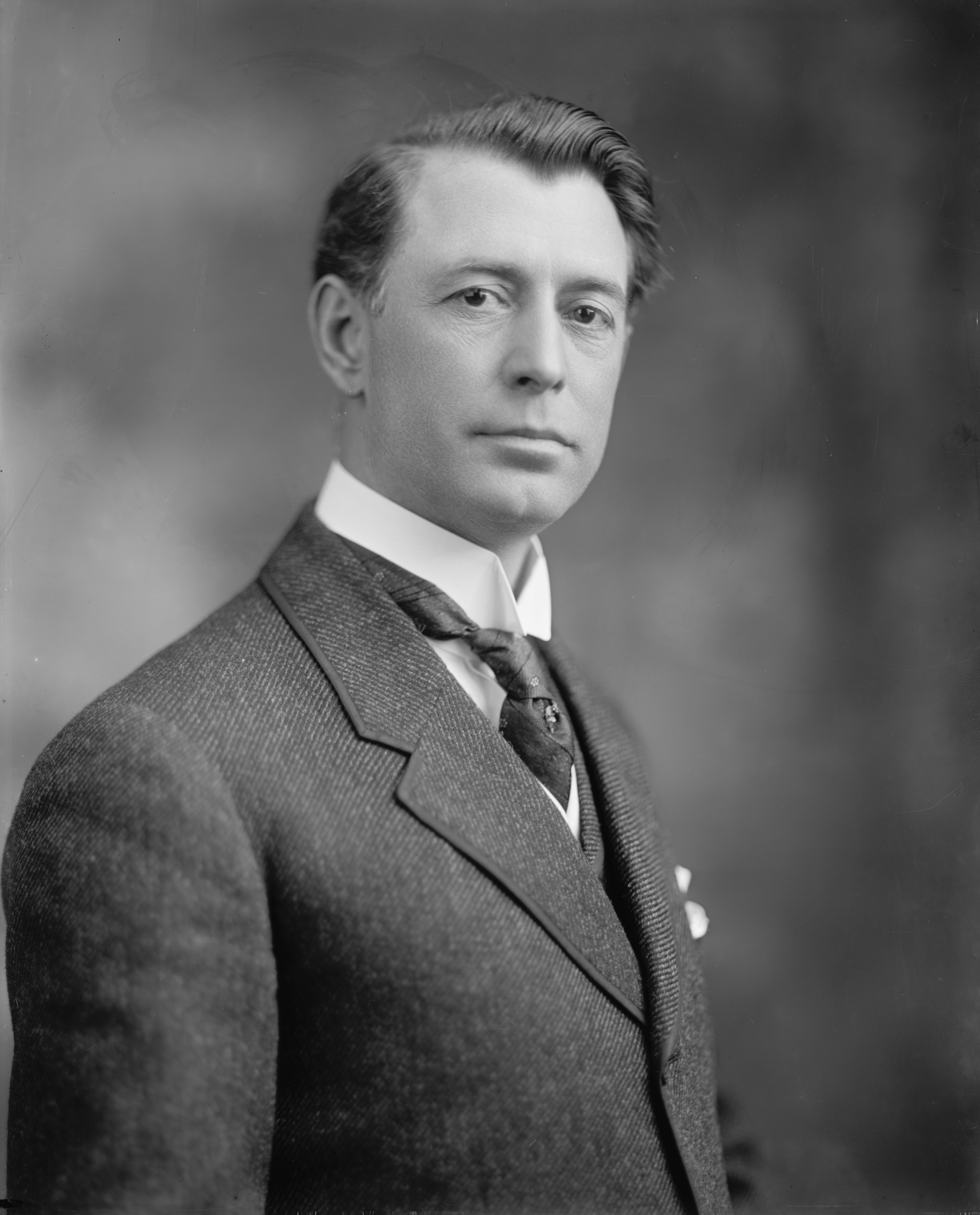
Senator Key Pittman

Popular state election results by county Pittman: 30–40% 40–50% 50–60% Massey: 30–40% 40–50% 50–60%

Republican senator George S. Nixon died on June 5, 1912. Republican former judge William A. Massey was appointed on July 1, 1912, to continue the term that would end in 1917, pending a special election. In November 1912, Massey lost the popular vote for the special election to Democratic attorney Key Pittman, who was elected by the Nevada Legislature on January 28, 1913.

Nevada popular vote (November 5, 1912)
| Party | Candidate | Votes | % |
|---|---|---|---|
| Democratic | Key Pittman | 7,942 | 39.78% |
| Republican | William A. Massey (incumbent) | 7,853 | 39.34% |
| Socialist | George A. Steele | 2,740 | 13.73% |
| Progressive | Sardis Summerfield | 1,428 | 7.15% |

Pittman had a small plurality in the November 1912 popular vote, but the legislature elected him almost unanimously.

Nevada Senate vote (January 28, 1913)
| Party | Candidate | Votes | % |
|---|---|---|---|
| Democratic | Key Pittman | 20 | 90.9% |
| Socialist | George A. Steele | 2 | 9.1% |

Nevada House of Representatives vote (January 28, 1913)
| Party | Candidate | Votes | % |
|---|---|---|---|
| Democratic | Key Pittman | 50 | 98.0% |
| Socialist | George A. Steele | 1 | 2.0% |
| Democratic gain from Republican | | | |

Massey died the next year, and Pittman would go on to serve for 27 more years and win re-election four times, serving as president pro tempore throughout the New Deal.

== New Hampshire ==
New Hampshire election
- March 26, 1913 (late)
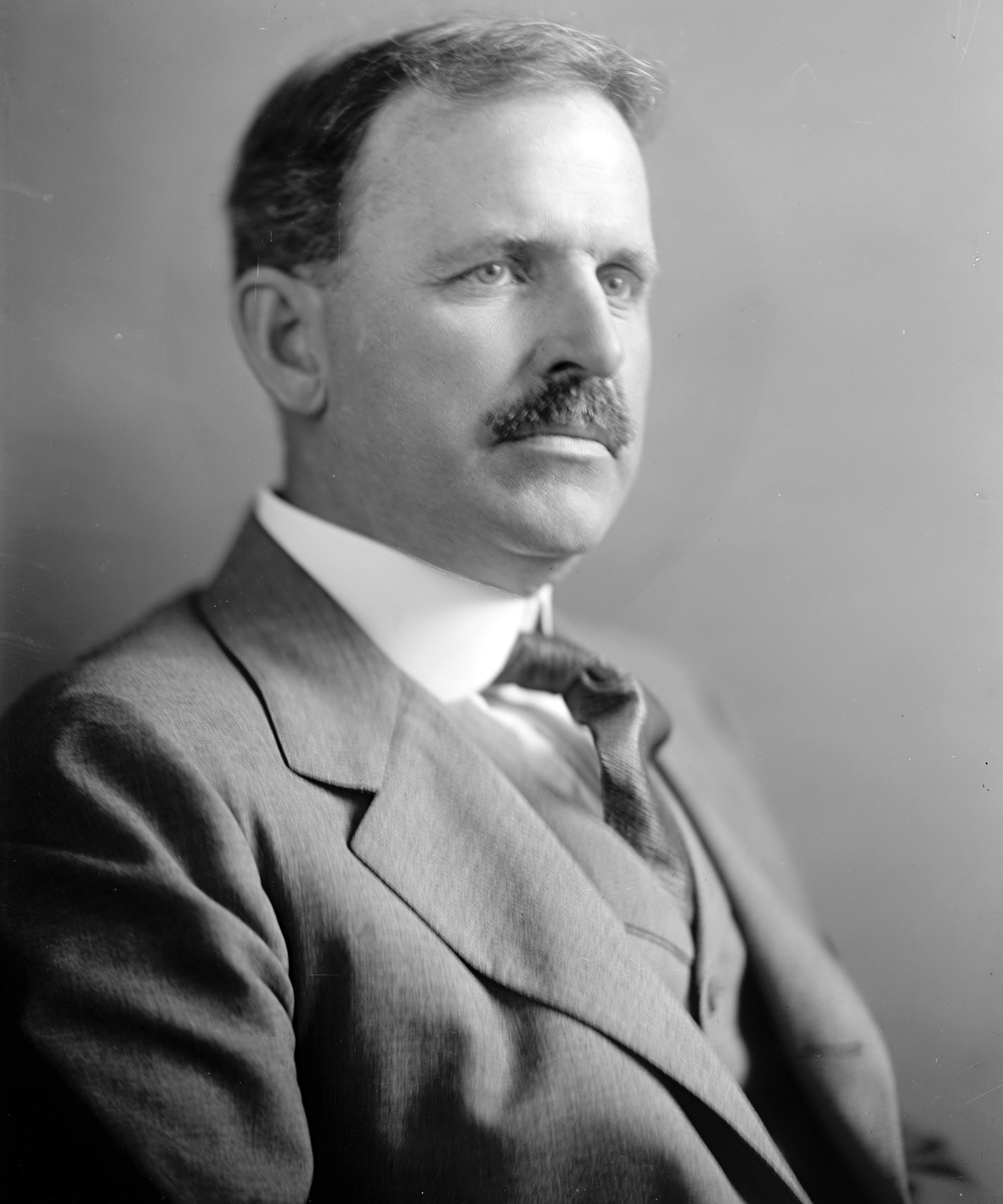

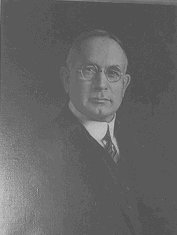
| Nominee | Henry F. Hollis | John H. Bartlett |
| Party | Democratic | Republican |
| Members' vote | 189 | 121 |
| Percentage | 50.94% | 32.62% |
U.S. senator before election
Henry E. Burnham
Republican
Elected U.S. senator
Henry F. Hollis
Democratic

Two-term Republican Henry E. Burnham decided to retire. The New Hampshire legislature failed to elect a new senator after 42 votes, so the March 4, 1913, term begin with the seat vacant.

Finally, on March 26, 1913, on the 43rd vote, Democrat Henry F. Hollis was elected with the required majority, albeit slight. Hollis was a former candidate for U.S. House of Representatives (in 1900), and twice for governor of New Hampshire (in 1902 and 1904).

New Hampshire legislative vote, class 2 (March 13, 1913)
| Party | Candidate | Votes | % |
|---|---|---|---|
| Democratic | Henry F. Hollis | 189 | 50.94% |
| Republican | John H. Bartlett | 121 | 32.62% |
| Republican | Henry B. Quinby | 18 | 4.85% |
| Republican | Edward N. Pearson | 14 | 3.77% |
| Progressive | Robert P. Bass | 12 | 3.24% |
| Republican | Sherman E. Burroughs | 5 | 1.35% |
| Democratic | Gordon Woodbury | 3 | 0.81% |
| Democratic | Clarence E. Carr | 2 | 0.54% |
| Unknown | William D. Swart | 2 | 0.54% |
| Republican | Thomas Chalmers | 1 | 0.27% |
| Republican | William Eaton Chandler | 1 | 0.27% |
| Republican | John Scammon | 1 | 0.27% |
| Unknown | Bertram Ellis | 1 | 0.27% |
| Unknown | Henry C. Wells | 1 | 0.27% |
| Democratic gain from Republican | | | |

Hollis would retire after a single term and be replaced, in a popular vote, by Republican Henry W. Keyes.

== New Jersey ==
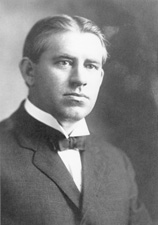
Senator William Hughes

One-term incumbent Republican Frank O. Briggs lost re-election to Democratic state judge (and former member of the U.S. House) William Hughes. The New Jersey Legislature elected Hughes on January 28, 1913.

New Jersey Senate election, January 28, 1913
| Party | Candidate | Votes | % |
|---|---|---|---|
| Democratic | William Hughes | 12 | 57.14% |
| Republican | Frank O. Briggs (incumbent) | 9 | 42.86% |

New Jersey General Assembly election, January 28, 1913
| Party | Candidate | Votes | % |
|---|---|---|---|
| Democratic | William Hughes | 51 | 86.44% |
| Republican | Frank O. Briggs (incumbent) | 8 | 13.56% |

New Jersey Legislative election, January 28, 1913
| Party | Candidate | Votes | % |
|---|---|---|---|
| Democratic | William Hughes | 63 | 78.75% |
| Republican | Frank O. Briggs (incumbent) | 17 | 21.25% |
| Democratic gain from Republican | | | |

Briggs died just a few months later, on May 8, 1913. Hughes did not serve the complete term, dying on January 30, 1918, just before the next scheduled election.

== New Mexico ==
=== New Mexico (initial) ===
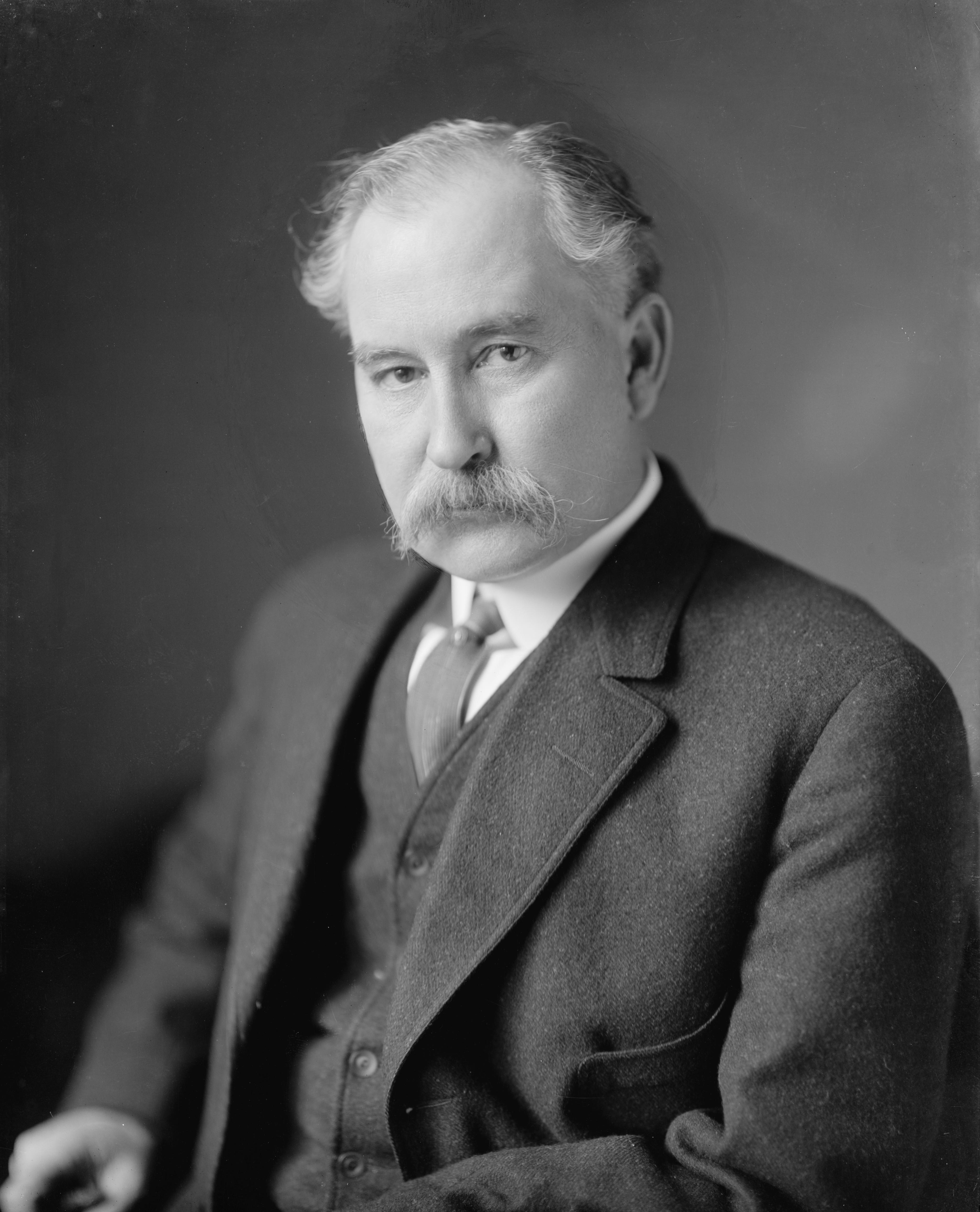
Senator Albert B. Fall

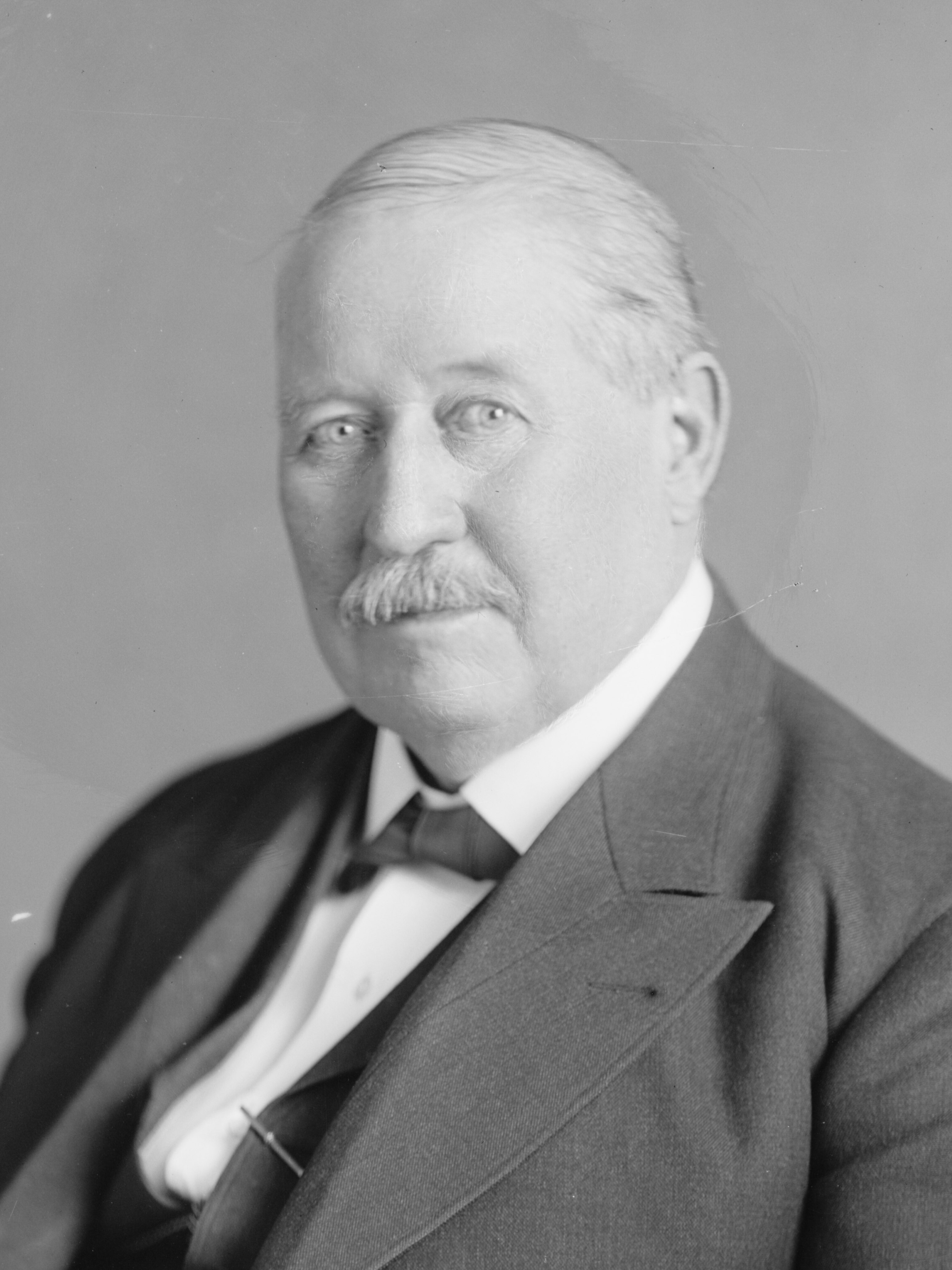
Senator Thomas B. Catron

New Mexico became a new state on January 6, 1912, with senators in classes 1 (ending 1917) and 2 (ending 1913). On March 27, 1912, the state elected its initial senators on the eighth ballot: Republican Thomas B. Catron, an early advocate for New Mexico statehood who had marshaled the territorial Republican Party to lobby Republicans at the national level for New Mexico's admission to the Union; and Republican Albert B. Fall, a powerful attorney, former territorial attorney general, future secretary of the interior, and instigator of the Teapot Dome scandal.

Catron made a personal alliance with Fall, ensuring that each of them would be elected. This alliance antagonized New Mexicans of Spanish heritage, who had hoped that one of their own would become a senator.

- ✓ Albert B. Fall (Republican) 39 votes (Class 2)
- ✓ Thomas B. Catron (Republican) 38 votes (Class 1)
- Felix Martinez (Democratic) 25 votes
- Andrieus A. Jones (Democratic) 23 votes
- William G. Mills (Republican) 7 votes
- Herbert J. Hagerman (Progressive Republican) 3 votes
- L. Bradford Prince (Republican) 3 votes
- Eugene Romero (Republican) 3 votes
- W. H. Gillenwater (Progressive Republican) 2 votes
- O. A. Larrazolo (Republican) 2 votes
- Jose D. Sena (Republican) 1 vote

=== New Mexico (regular) ===
Fall's term would end in March 1913, so he was up for re-election shortly after his initial term began.

The bitterness over Catron and Fall's alliance made Fall a target of the local Republican Party, as they believed Fall had not contributed sufficiently to their efforts to secure New Mexico's statehood, and was not worthy of their nomination. The selection of Catron and Fall also disappointed Hispanics, who had hoped that one of their own would be selected. Fall was also severely disliked by Democrats.

After various votes, the legislature re-elected Fall January 28, 1913. Governor McDonald, on the advice of his Democratic legal advisor, Summers Burkhart, said that the legislature's procedure had been illegal, and failed to sign the credentialing papers in an attempt to oust Fall by forcing a special session of the legislature and a new vote. The attempt failed; Fall won the special legislative election.

== North Carolina ==
Democratic primary results by county Simmons: 40–50% 50–60% 60–70% 70–80% 80–90% Kitchin: 40–50% 50–60% 60–70% 70–80% 80–90% >90% Clark: 30–40% 40–50% No vote:

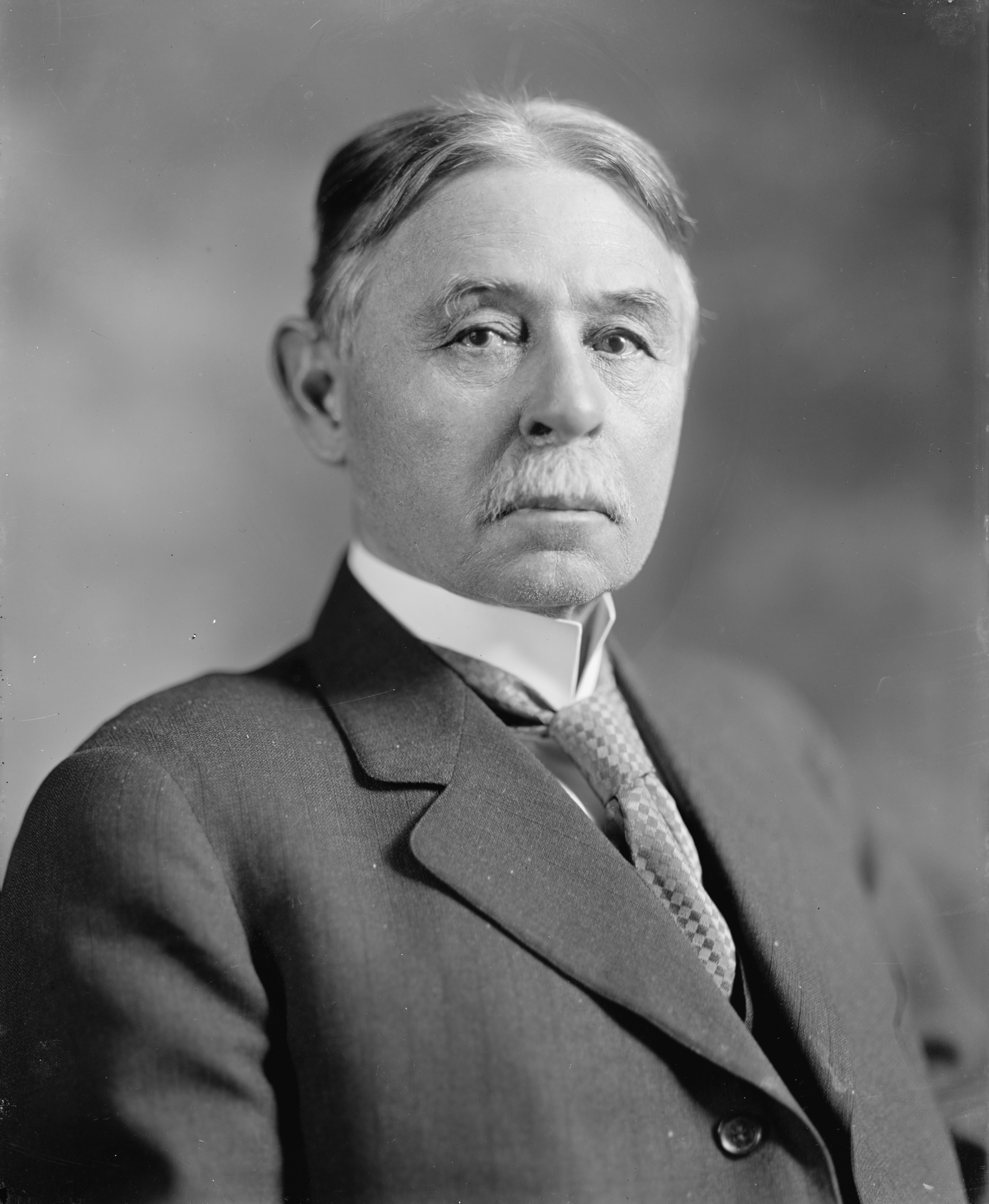
Senator Furnifold Simmons

Two-term Democrat Furnifold Simmons was easily re-elected on January 21, 1913. Simmons was a staunch segregationist, a white supremacist, and a leading perpetrator of the Wilmington massacre of 1898.

North Carolina Democratic primary (November 5, 1912 (Note: Date might be incorrect, as it is the date of the general popular election.))
| Party | Candidate | Votes | % |
|---|---|---|---|
| Democratic | Furnifold Simmons (incumbent) | 84,687 | 57.18% |
| Democratic | William W. Kitchin (Governor) | 47,010 | 31.74% |
| Democratic | Walter Clark (State judge) | 16,418 | 11.09% |

North Carolina legislative election (January 22, 1913)
| Party | Candidate | Votes | % |
|---|---|---|---|
| Democratic | Furnifold Simmons (incumbent) | 144 | 88.34% |
| Republican | Cyrus Thompson (N.C. Secretary of State) | 19 | 11.66% |

Simmons would be re-elected twice more after this, and would serve until 1931, when he fell out with the national Democratic Party.

== Oklahoma ==
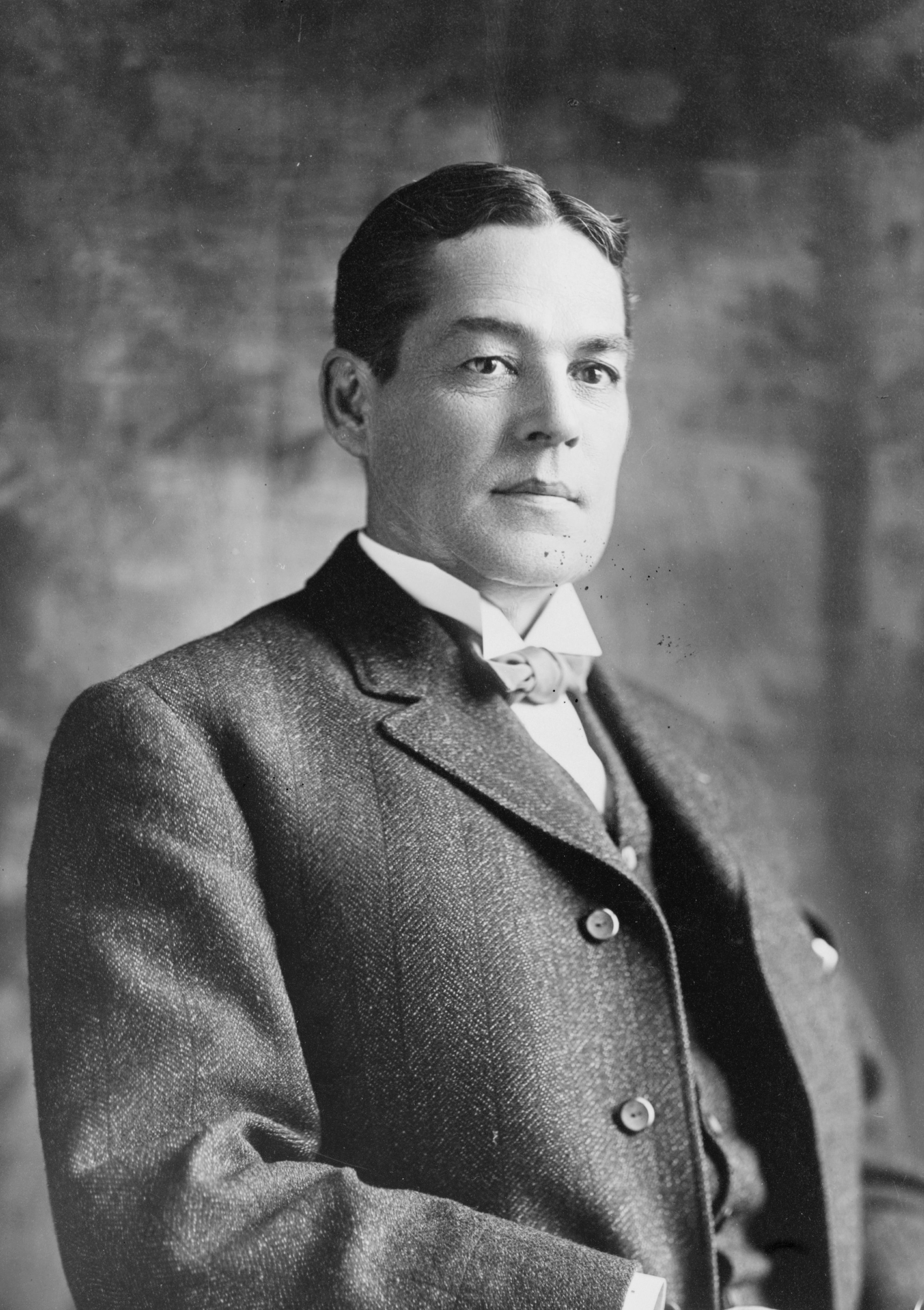
Senator Robert L. Owen

Popular state election results by county Owen: 30–40% 40–50% 50–60% 60–70% Dickerson: 40–50% 50–60%

One-term Democrat Robert L. Owen was re-elected over token opposition from Governor of Oklahoma Charles N. Haskell in the Democratic primary and perennial Republican candidate Joseph Dickerson.

Oklahoma Democratic primary (August 6, 1912)
| Party | Candidate | Votes | % |
|---|---|---|---|
| Democratic | Robert L. Owen (incumbent) | 80,204 | 64.32% |
| Democratic | Charles N. Haskell | 44,483 | 35.68% |
| Turnout | | | 7.52% |

Oklahoma popular election (November 5, 1912)
| Party | Candidate | Votes | % |
|---|---|---|---|
| Democratic | Robert L. Owen (incumbent) | 126,418 | 50.43% |
| Republican | Joseph Dickerson | 83,429 | 33.28% |
| Socialist | John Wills | 40,860 | 16.3% |
| Turnout | | | 15.13% |

Owen was formally and unanimously elected by the Oklahoma Legislature January 21, 1913.

Owen would run for U.S. president (failing to achieve his party's nomination), and then serve a third and final term as the young state's initial Class 2 senator, retiring in 1925.

== Oregon ==
Senator Harry Lane

Popular state election results by county Lane: 20–30% 30–40% Selling: 20–30% 30–40% 40–50% Bourne: 30–40%

One-term Republican Jonathan Bourne Jr. had championed direct election of senators but lost renomination as a Republican. He then ran in the popular election as a "Popular Government" candidate, but also lost re-election. Democratic Mayor of Portland Harry Lane was elected.

The ballot was cluttered. In addition to the Lane and Ben Selling, candidate of the conservative wing of the Republican Party, progressive Republicans had other electoral alternatives, including the candidate and the incumbent senator Jonathan Bourne Jr., who had failed to win the renomination of the Republican party and ran as the "Popular Government" nominee as a result. Meanwhile, Benjamin F. Ramp stood for the Socialists, and yet another candidate was the nominee of the Prohibition Party. Each of these six candidates took more than 5% of the vote, which enabled the Lane to win election with a plurality of the vote in solidly Republican Oregon. Intent on proving himself a man of the people, Harry Lane set what might be a record for campaign frugality in his victorious effort, with his entire race run for $75 plus travel expenses.

Oregon popular vote, class 2 (November 5, 1912)
| Party | Candidate | Votes | % |
|---|---|---|---|
| Democratic | Harry Lane | 40,172 | 30.07% |
| Republican | Ben Selling | 38,453 | 28.79% |
| Popular Government | Jonathan Bourne Jr. (incumbent) | 25,929 | 19.41% |
| Socialist | Benjamin F. Ramp | 11,093 | 8.31% |
| Progressive | A. E. Clark | 11,083 | 8.30% |
| Prohibition | B. Lee Paget | 6,848 | 5.13% |
| Democratic gain from Republican | | | |

The Oregon Legislature thereupon elected Lane to the seat January 21, 1913, ratifying the popular selection made in the November 1912 elections.

Election by the Oregon Senate, January 21, 1913
| Party | Candidate | Votes | % |
|---|---|---|---|
| Democratic | Harry Lane | 28 | 93.3% |
| Republican | Ben Selling | 2 | 6.7% |

Both senators voting for Selling declared that they voted to protest a new system of nomination.

Election by the Oregon House of Representatives election, January 21, 1913
| Party | Candidate | Votes | % |
|---|---|---|---|
| Democratic | Harry Lane | 59 | 98.3% |
| Republican | Ben Selling | 1 | 1.7% |

Lane died in office on May 23, 1917.

== Rhode Island ==
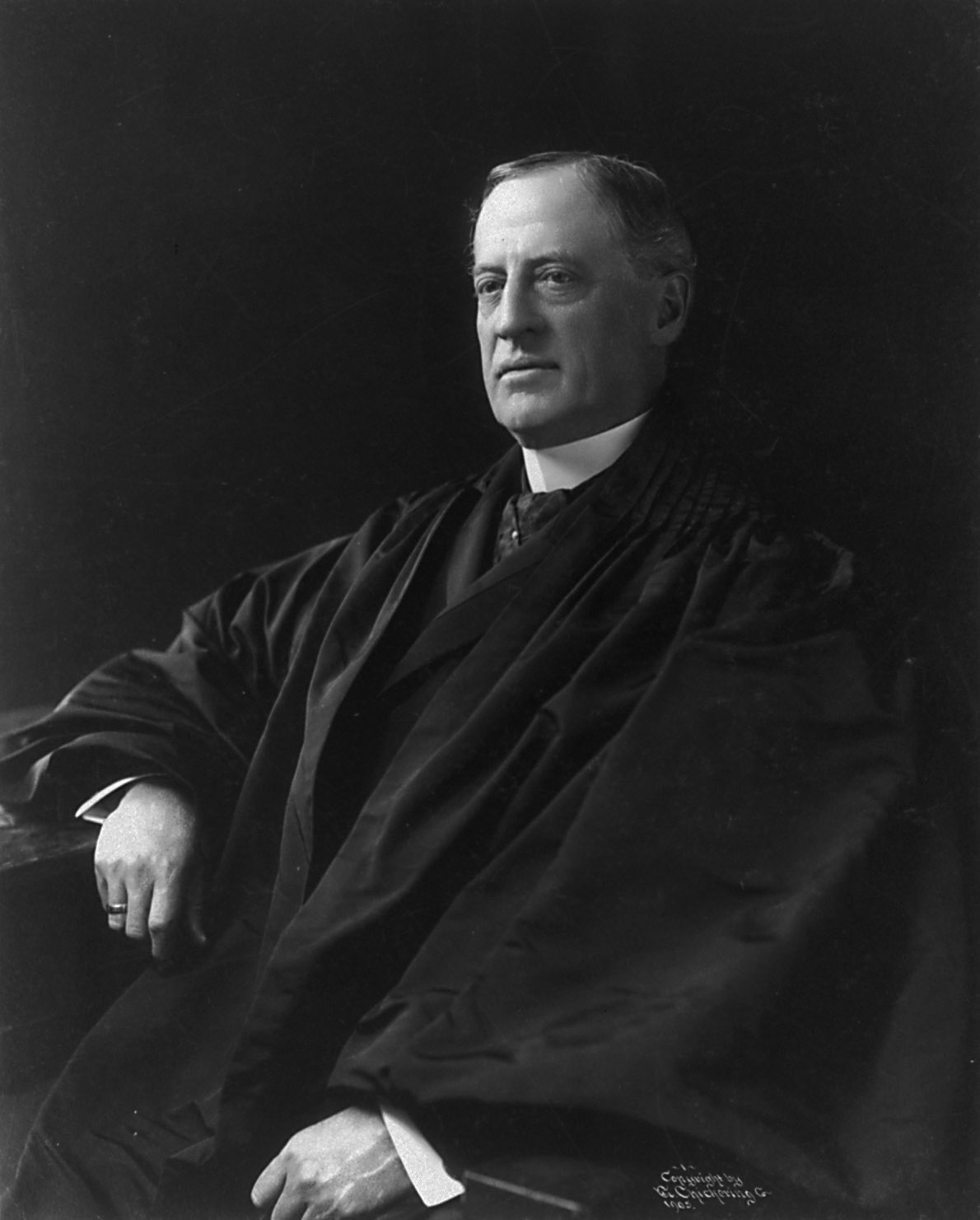
Senator LeBaron Colt

Three-term Republican George P. Wetmore retired and was replaced by Republican Judge LeBaron Colt on January 21, 1913.

Election by the Rhode Island Senate, January 21, 1913
| Party | Candidate | Votes | % |
|---|---|---|---|
| Republican | LeBaron Colt | 32 | 82.1% |
| Democratic | Addison P. Munroe | 5 | 12.8% |
| Progressive | George W. Parks | 2 | 5.1% |
| Turnout | | 39 | 100% |

Both senators voting for Selling declared that they voted to protest a new system of nomination.

Election by the Rhode Island House of Representatives election, January 21, 1913
| Party | Candidate | Votes | % |
|---|---|---|---|
| Republican | LeBaron Colt | 56 | 56.0% |
| Democratic | Addison P. Munroe | 37 | 37.0% |
| Progressive | George W. Parks | 7 | 7.0% |
| Turnout | | 100 | 100% |

The following day, the Joint Assembly formally declared Colt elected. Colt resigned on February 7, 1913, from the U.S. Court of Appeals for the First Circuit, in which he had served since 1891.

When asked concerning his ideas on national issues Judge Colt replied that he was still a member of the court, and until his resignation he did not think it would be dignified or courteous to talk upon the subject."

Colt would be re-elected in 1918, and would die near the end of that second term on August 18, 1924.

== South Carolina ==
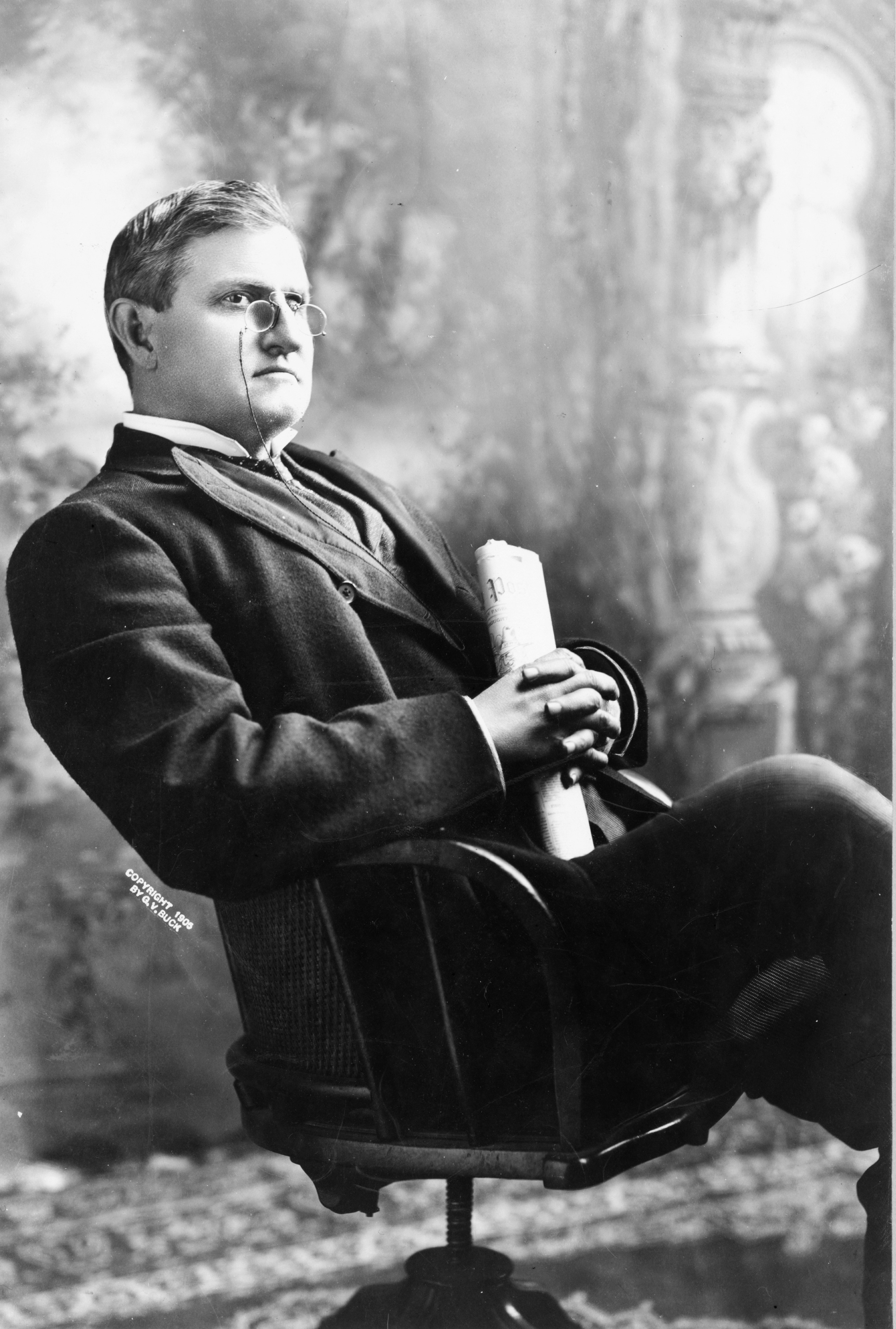
Senator Benjamin Tillman

The South Carolina race was mostly a Democratic primary election held the previous summer on August 27, 1912. The Democratic Party of South Carolina organized primary elections for the U.S. Senate beginning in 1896, and the General Assembly would confirm the choice of the Democratic voters.

Incumbent Democrat Benjamin Tillman, who had served since 1895, drew opposition in the Democratic primary for the first time during his career. He had long avoided any opposition because of his influence in the Democratic Party in the state, but by 1912 he had moderated his positions and lost the radical edge that had allowed him to build up a hard core following of support. The radicals in the state electorate had thrown their support to Coleman Livingston Blease in the gubernatorial election of 1910, and the Bleasites were determined to knock his chief opponent, Tillman, out of office. W. Jasper Talbert emerged as the candidate of the Bleasites, and Nathaniel B. Dial entered the race as an alternative to the two. The voters of the state split their support between the Tillmanite and Bleasite factions, as both Tillman and Blease won their respective primaries.

Tillman won the Democratic primary.

South Carolina Democratic primary
| Candidate | Votes | % |
|---|---|---|
| Benjamin Tillman | 73,148 | 52.7 |
| W. Jasper Talbert | 37,141 | 26.8 |
| Nathaniel B. Dial | 28,476 | 20.5 |

Tillman was re-elected on January 28, 1913, by the General Assembly, for another six-year term.

Election by the South Carolina legislature:

- Vote in the South Carolina Senate: Unanimous (37 votes of 37 senators voting)
- Vote in the South Carolina House of Representatives: Unanimous (114 votes of the 114 members voting)

== South Dakota ==
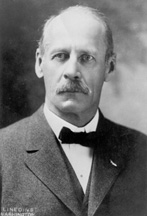
Senator Thomas Sterling

Two-term Republican Robert J. Gamble lost renomination.

South Dakota Republican primary, June 4, 1912
| Party | Candidate | Votes | % |
|---|---|---|---|
| Republican | Thomas Sterling | 25,896 | 35.00% |
| Republican | Robert J. Gamble (incumbent) | 25,161 | 34.01% |
| Republican | Richard Olsen Richards | 16,983 | 22.96% |
| Republican | Melvin Grigsby | 5,941 | 8.03% |
| Turnout | | 73,981 | 12.67% |

Republican Thomas Sterling was elected on January 22, 1913, with 97 votes.

== Tennessee ==
One-term Democrat Robert Love Taylor died on March 31, 1912, and Republican Newell Sanders was appointed in his place, pending a special election. Sanders was not a candidate in either election.

The Tennessee legislature elected two senators: one to the next term and one to finish the current term.

=== Tennessee (regular) ===
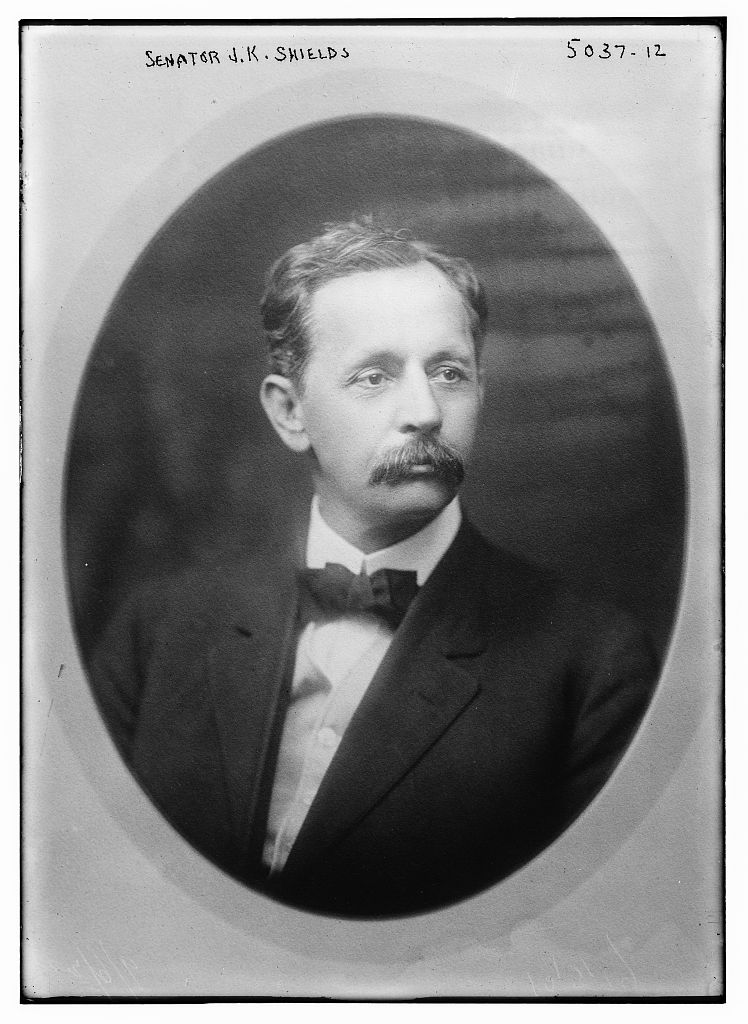
Senator John K. Shields

Chief Justice of the Tennessee Supreme Court John K. Shields was elected on January 23, 1913, to the next term beginning on March 4, 1913. He had not been a candidate in the special election.

General election by the Tennessee Legislature, January 23, 1913 (Seventh Ballot)
| Party | Candidate | Votes | % |
|---|---|---|---|
| Democratic | John K. Shields | 69 | 52.7% |
| Independent Democratic | Charles T. Cates Jr. | 61 | 46.6% |
| | Present but not voting | 1 | 0.8% |
| Turnout | | 130 | 96% |

Shields would be re-elected in 1918, but would lose renomination in 1924.

=== Tennessee (special) ===
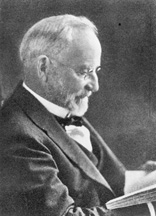
Senator William R. Webb

Democrat William R. Webb, the founder of the Webb School and former Confederate soldier, was elected on January 23, 1913, to finish the term ending on March 3, 1913. Webb was not a candidate in the general election.

Special election by the Tennessee Legislature, January 24, 1913
| Party | Candidate | Votes | % |
|---|---|---|---|
| Democratic | William R. Webb | 73 | 57.0% |
| Democratic | M. T. Bryan | 53 | 41.4% |
| Democratic | J. A. Clement | 1 | 0.8% |
| Democratic | C. W. Tyler | 1 | 0.8% |
| Turnout | | 128 | 96% |

The election was then made unanimous by motion of the joint convention.

== Texas ==
Texas special election
- January 28, 1913

Needed to win: Majority of votes cast in both houses (Note: Senate ballot: 29 votes cast, 15 needed for a majority House ballot: 142 votes cast, 71 needed for a majority)
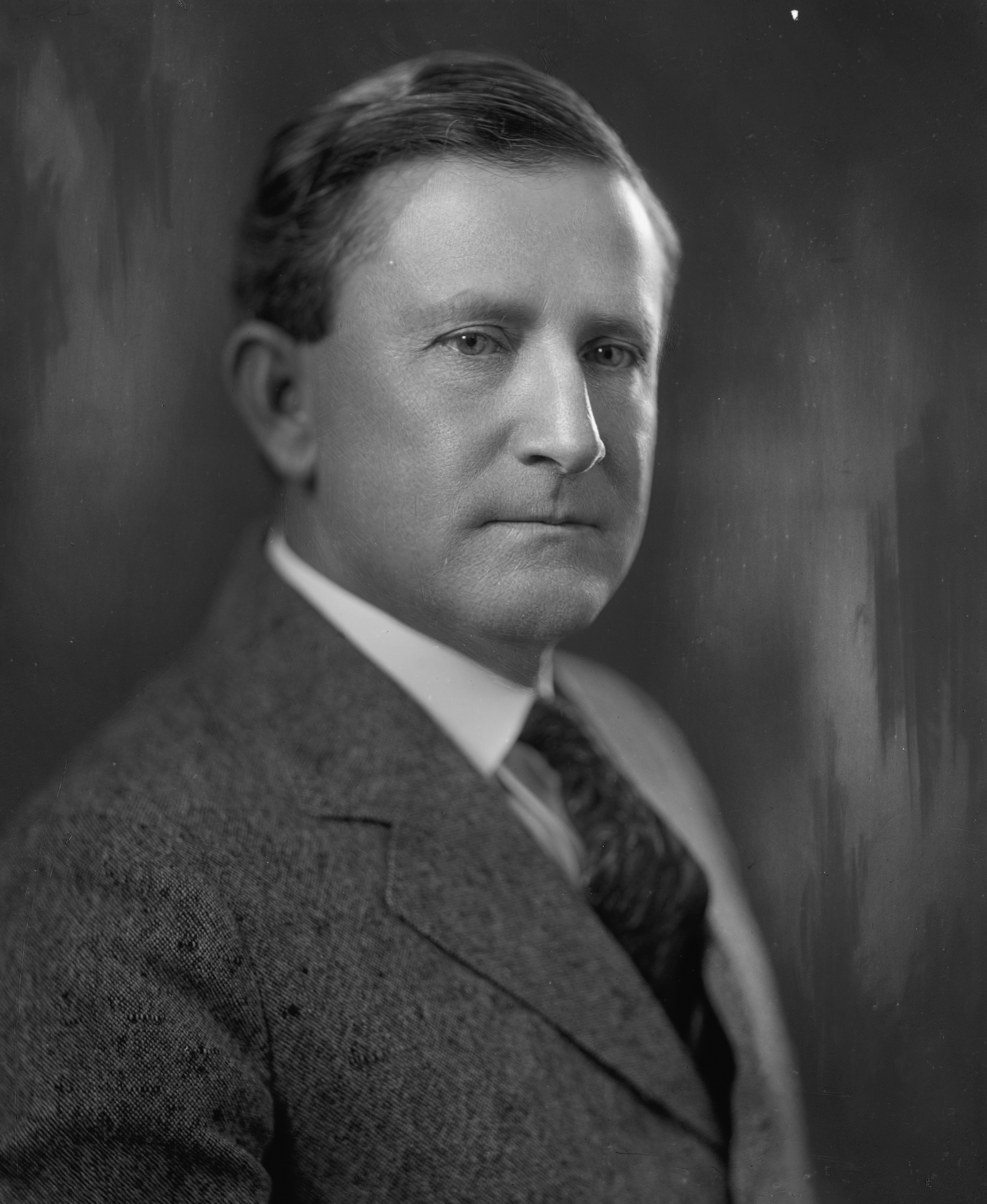

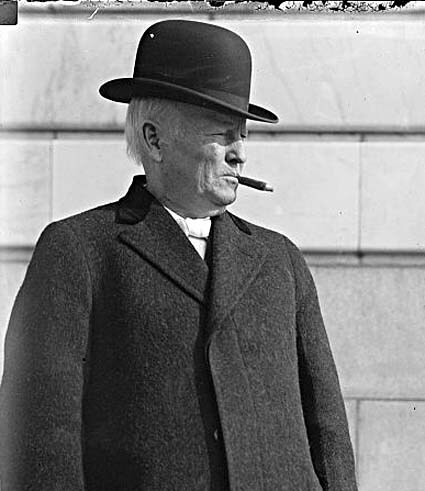

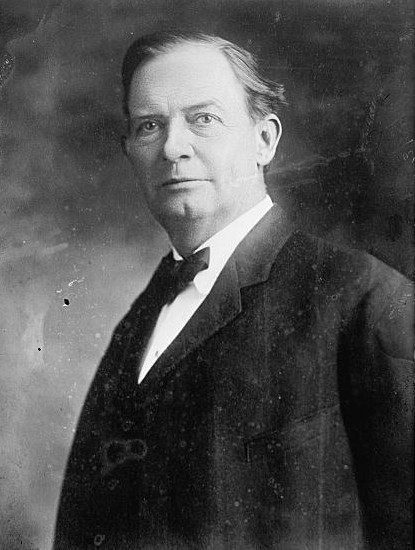
| | Majority party | Minority party | Third party |
|---|---|---|---|
| Candidate | Morris; Sheppard | Rienzi M. Johnston | Choice B. Randell |
| Party | Democratic | Democratic | Democratic |
| Senate ballot | 17 (58.6%) | 12 (41.3%) | — |
| House ballot | 87 (61.2%) | 54 (38.0%) | 1 (0.70%) |
- Senate ballot

House ballot
Sheppard
Not voting
Johnston
Randall
U.S. Senator before election
Rienzi M. Johnston
Democratic
Elected U.S. Senator
Morris Sheppard
Democratic

Two-term Democrat Joseph Weldon Bailey resigned on January 3, 1913, and Democrat Rienzi M. Johnston was appointed on January 4, 1913, to continue the term, pending a special election. In fact, Texas held two elections on January 28, 1913: a special election for the term ending March 3, 1913, and a general election for the next term starting on March 4, 1913. Both were won by Democratic Congressman Morris Sheppard.

=== Texas (special) ===
The Democratic primary was held on July 27, 1912. Morris Sheppard, C. B. Randell, Mat Zollner, and Jake Wolters were candidates. Sheppard received a plurality of the vote.

Texas Democratic primary (1912)
| Party | Candidate | Votes | % |
|---|---|---|---|
| Democratic | Morris Sheppard | 182,907 | 48.94% |
| Democratic | Jacob F. Wolters | 146,214 | 39.12% |
| Democratic | Choice B. Randell | 40,693 | 10.89% |
| Democratic | Matthew Zollner | 3,960 | 1.06% |
| Total votes | | 373,774 | 100.00% |

Appointee Rienzi M. Johnston ran for but lost election to finish the shortened term.

Special election by the Texas Legislature, January 29, 1913
| Party | Candidate | Votes | % |
|---|---|---|---|
| Democratic | Morris Sheppard | 104 | 60.8% |
| Democratic | Rienzi M. Johnston | 66 | 38.6% |
| Democratic | Choice B. Randell | 1 | 0.6% |

Following his brief 25-day Senate term, Johnston returned to Houston and resumed his role as editor of the Houston Post. He retired from the newspaper business in 1919.

=== Texas (regular) ===
Perhaps due to the overwhelming support for the special election, Sheppard had no opposition in the subsequent general election.

Election by the Texas Legislature, January 29, 1913
| Party | Candidate | Votes | % |
|---|---|---|---|
| Democratic | Morris Sheppard | 172 | 100.0% |

Sheppard would win re-election four times, serving until his death in 1941.

== Virginia ==
Virginia held non-binding primaries on September 7, 1911, for both the class 2 seat held by Democrat Thomas S. Martin, who was running for re-election, and the class 1 seat held by Democrat Claude Swanson, who had been appointed to fill a vacancy.

=== Virginia (special) ===
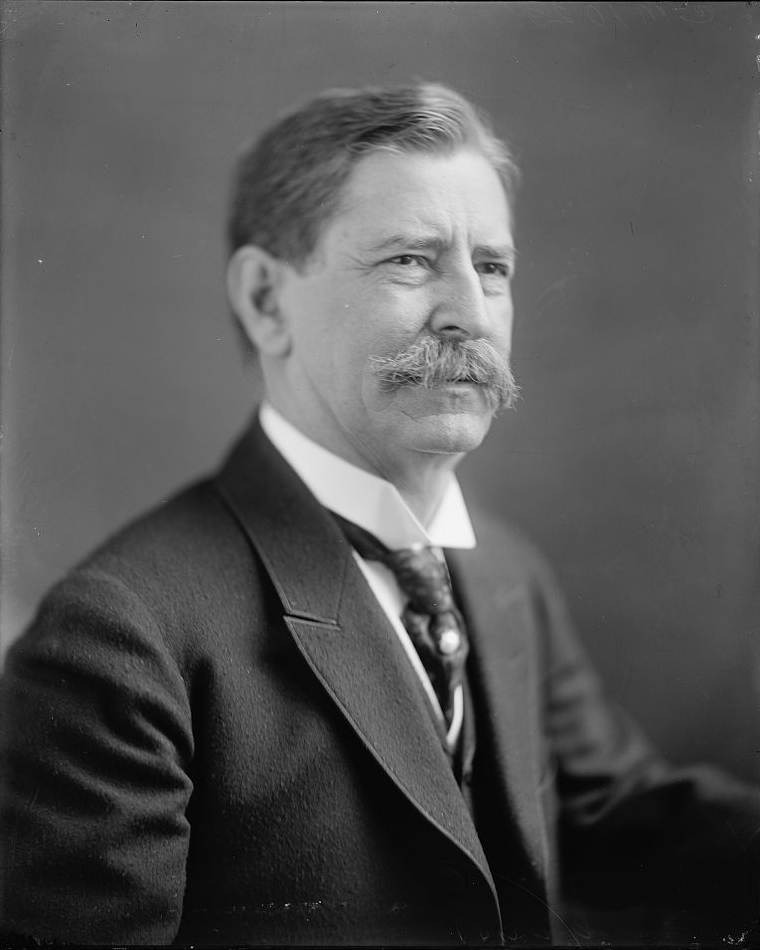
Senator Claude A. Swanson

Democrat John W. Daniel died on June 29, 1910, and Democrat Claude A. Swanson, former governor of Virginia and former congressman, was appointed on August 1, 1910, to finish the term ending in March 1911, and was again appointed on February 28, 1911, to begin the 1911–1917 term, pending a special election.

Swanson won the class 1 Democratic primary for the term ending in 1917 with 67,495 votes over (future senator) Carter Glass's 28,757 votes.

On January 24, 1912, the Virginia General Assembly unanimously elected Swanson.

Virginia Senate election, January 23, 1912
| Party | Candidate | Votes | % |
|---|---|---|---|
| Democratic | Claude A. Swanson (incumbent) | 34 | 100% |

Virginia House of Delegates election, January 23, 1912
| Party | Candidate | Votes | % |
|---|---|---|---|
| Democratic | Claude A. Swanson (incumbent) | 83 | 100% |

=== Virginia (regular) ===
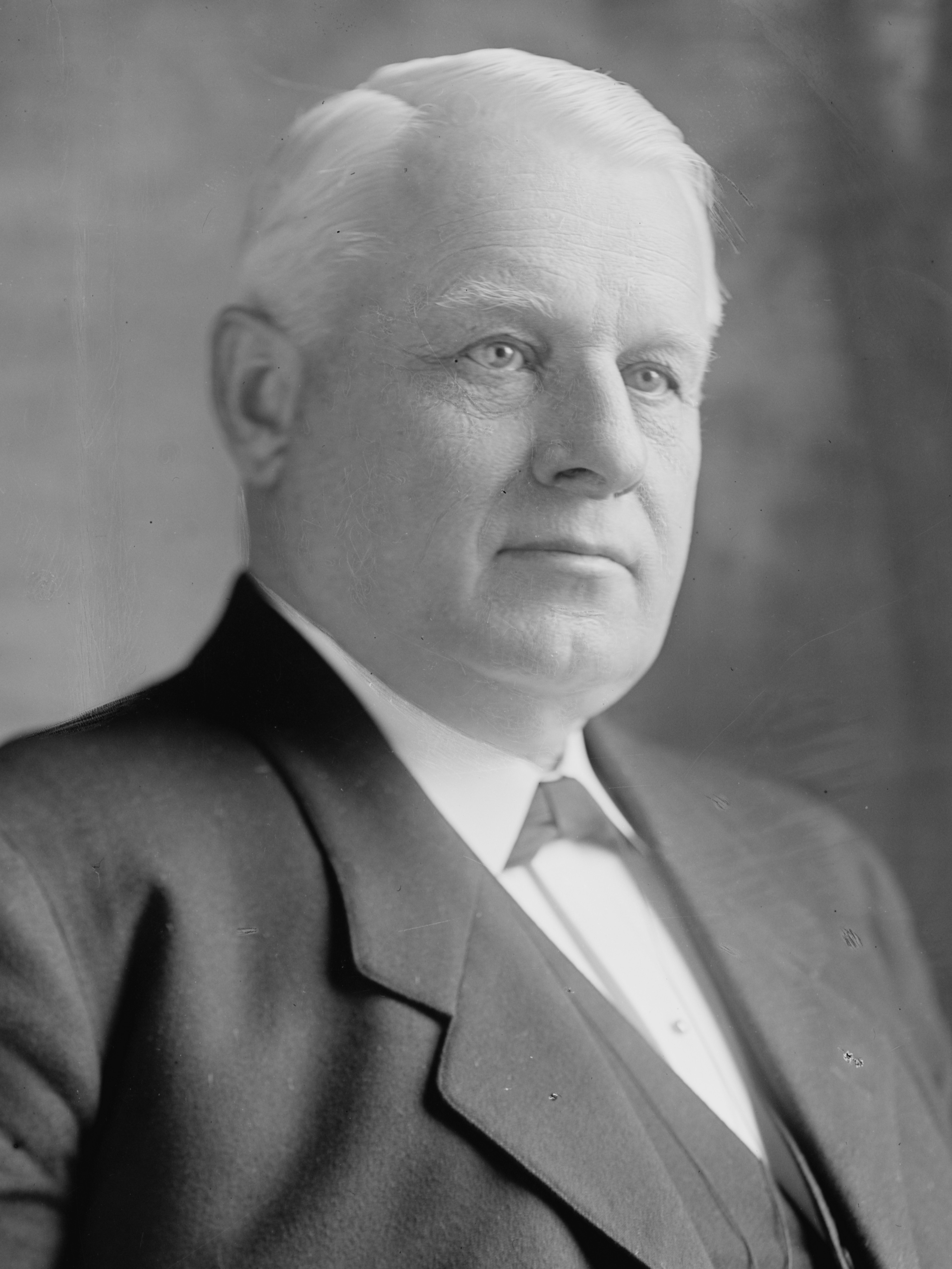
Senator Thomas S. Martin

Three-term incumbent Democrat Thomas S. Martin won the Democratic primary for the class 2 term ending in 1919, receiving 57,120 votes to 25,005 for William Atkinson Jones.

On January 24, 1912, the Virginia General Assembly unanimously elected Martin.

Virginia Senate election, January 23, 1912
| Party | Candidate | Votes | % |
|---|---|---|---|
| Democratic | Thomas S. Martin (incumbent) | 34 | 100% |

Virginia House of Delegates election, January 23, 1912
| Party | Candidate | Votes | % |
|---|---|---|---|
| Democratic | Thomas S. Martin (incumbent) | 85 | 100% |

== West Virginia ==
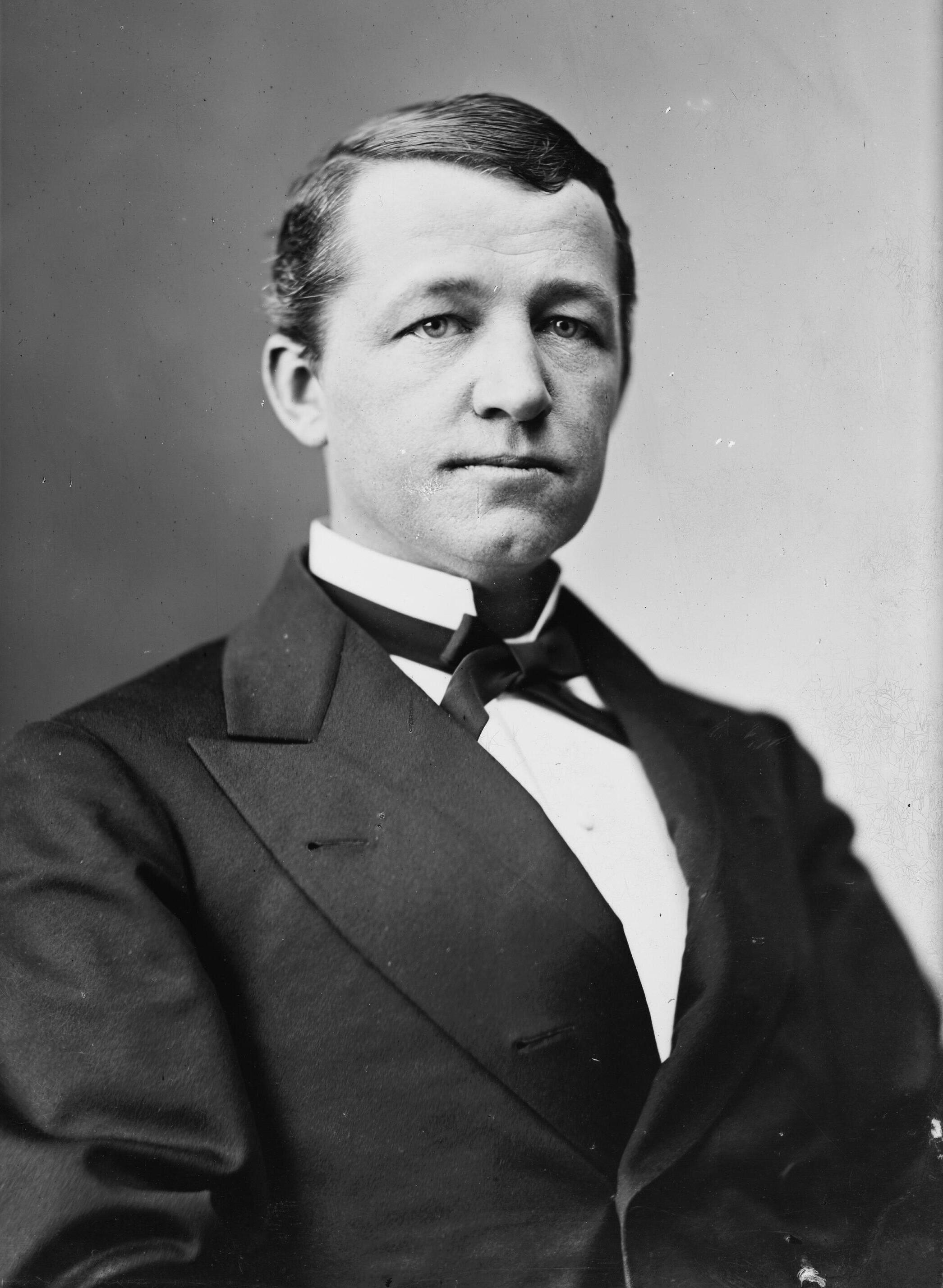
Senator Nathan Goff Jr.

Democrat Clarence Watson had been elected in 1911 to finish a vacant term, but he lost re-election on February 21, 1913, to Republican federal judge Nathan Goff Jr. after multiple deadlocked ballots.

Election in the joint assembly of the West Virginia Legislature, February 21, 1913
| Party | Candidate | Votes | % |
|---|---|---|---|
| Republican | Nathan Goff Jr. | 60 | 56.6% |
| Democratic | Clarence W. Watson (incumbent) | 43 | 40.6% |
| Democratic | Robert W. Dailey | 1 | 0.9% |
| Democratic | John W. Davis | 1 | 0.9% |
| Democratic | John W. Hamilton | 1 | 0.9% |

Goff would remain a judge until April 1, 1913, before taking his Senate seat. He would only serve the one term, retiring in 1919 due to ill health, and having barely cast any roll call votes throughout his Senate career. Goff held on to his seat despite being almost entirely absent from his duties in the Senate.

== Wyoming ==
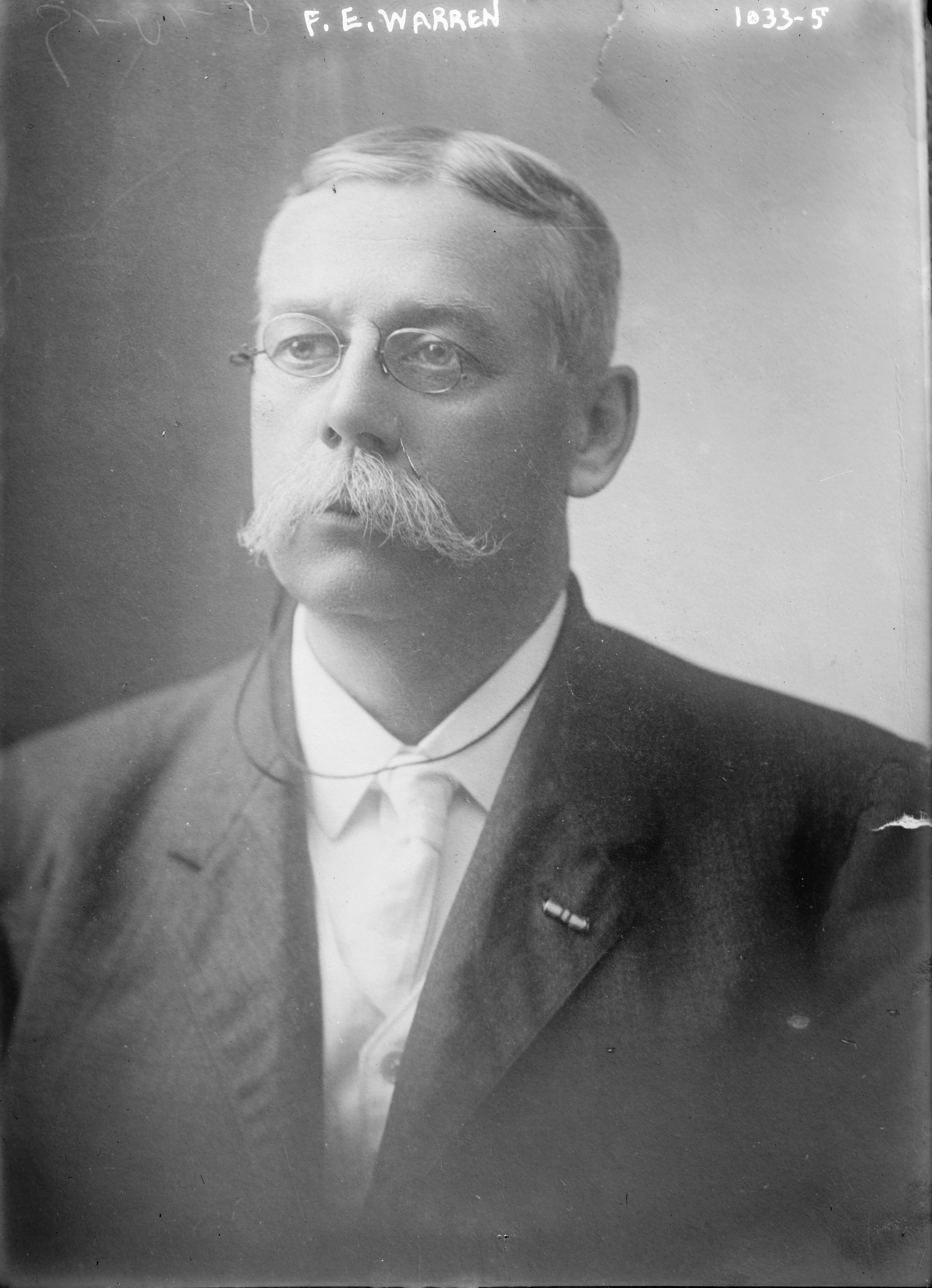
Senator Francis E. Warren

Four-term Republican Francis E. Warren was re-elected on January 28, 1913.

Election in the Wyoming Senate, January 28, 1913
| Party | Candidate | Votes | % |
|---|---|---|---|
| Republican | Francis E. Warren (incumbent) | 16 | 61.5% |
| Democratic | John B. Kendrick | 10 | 38.5% |

Election in the Wyoming House of Representatives, January 28, 1913
| Party | Candidate | Votes | % |
|---|---|---|---|
| Republican | Francis E. Warren (incumbent) | 29 | 51.8% |
| Democratic | John B. Kendrick | 27 | 48.2% |
| | Not voting | 1 | |

Kendrick would be elected to the other seat in 1916.

Warren would be re-elected two more times, becoming the dean of the United States Senate, and would serve until his death in 1929.

== See also ==
- 1912 United States elections
  - 1912 United States House of Representatives elections
  - 1912 United States presidential election
- 62nd United States Congress
- 63rd United States Congress

== Sources ==
- "United States Senate".
- "COLT MADE SENATOR". The New York Times. January 22, 1913. p. 4., with election stories from Rhode Island, Iowa, Nebraska, Oklahoma, Minnesota, South Dakota, Oregon, Delaware, New Hampshire, Tennessee, Wyoming, Idaho, West Virginia, and Illinois. Some are results and some are deadlocks.
- "United States Senators Chosen, 1911". The Tribune Almanac and Political Register 1912. New York: The Tribune Association. 1912. pp. 455–458 – via HathiTrust Digital Library.
- "United States Senators Chosen, 1912". The Tribune Almanac and Political Register 1913. New York: The Tribune Association. 1913. p. 457 – via HathiTrust Digital Library.
- "United States Senators Chosen, 1913". The Tribune Almanac and Political Register 1914. New York: The Tribune Association. 1914. pp. 458–460 – via HathiTrust Digital Library.
- Byrd, Robert C. (October 1, 1993). Wolff, Wendy (ed.). The Senate, 1789-1989: Historical Statistics, 1789-1992. United States Senate Historical Office (volume 4 Bicentennial ed.). Washington, D.C.: U.S. Government Printing Office. ISBN 9780160632563 – via Google Books.
- Fazio, Steven A. (Spring 1970). "Marcus Aurelius Smith: Arizona Delegate and Senator". Arizona and the West. 12 (1): 23–62. JSTOR 40168029.
- Goff, John S. (1985). Arizona Territorial Officials Volume III: The Delegates to Congress 1863-1912. Cave Creek, Arizona: Black Mountain Press. OCLC 12559708.
- Goff, John S. (1989). Marcus A. Smith. Arizona biographical series. Vol. 5. Cave Creek, Arizona: Black Mountain Press. OCLC 21013345.
