= 1918 United States Senate elections =

- November 5, 1918 (Note: There was a general election September 9, 1918, in Maine, and special elections in April and November 1918.)
- Class 2

38 of the 96 seats in the United States Senate 49 seats needed for a majority
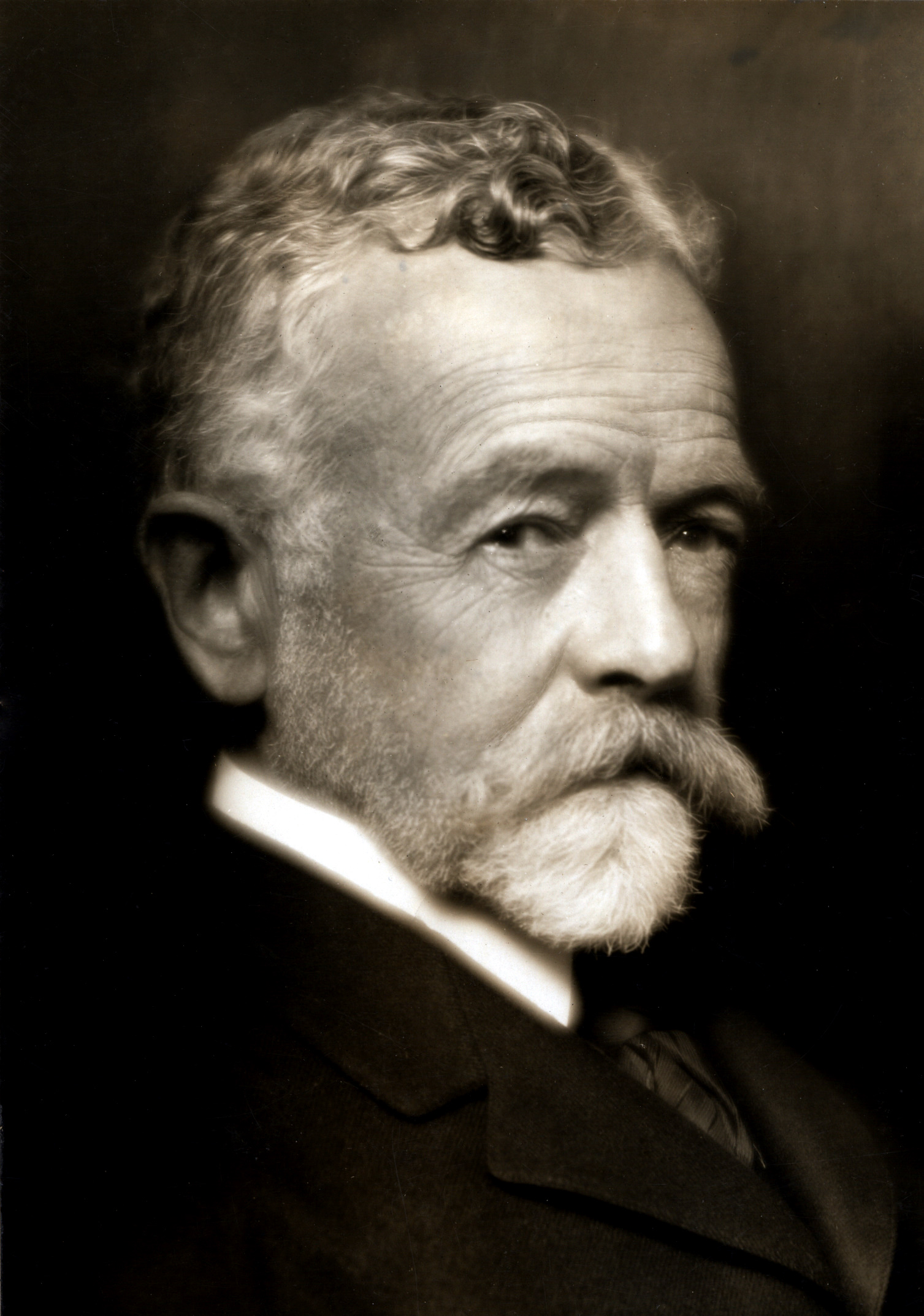

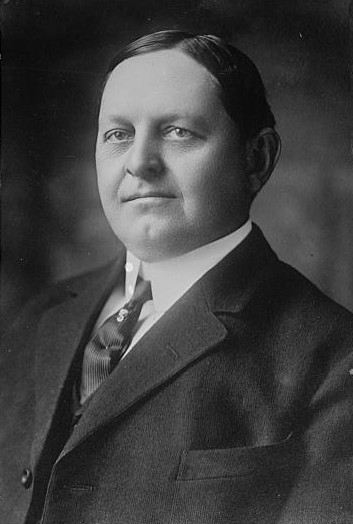
	Majority party	Minority party
Leader	Henry Cabot Lodge (Note: as Republican Conference Chairman)	Oscar Underwood
Party	Republican	Democratic
Leader since	March 4, 1919	April 27, 1920
Leader's seat	Massachusetts	Alabama
Seats before	44	52
Seats after	49	47
Seat change	▲5	▼5
Seats up	17	23
Seats won	22	18
- Results of the elections: Democratic gain Democratic hold Republican gain Republican hold No election
Majority Leader before election
Thomas S. Martin
(as Conference Chairman)
Democratic
Elected Majority Leader
Henry Cabot Lodge
(Unofficial)
Republican

The 1918 United States Senate elections were held throughout 1918, the midpoint of Woodrow Wilson's second term as president. This was the first election since the ratification of the 17th Amendment in 1913 that all 32 Class 2 senators were subject to direct or popular election, making them the final class under the old system of being selected by state legislatures. Special elections were also held to fill vacancies.

Republicans gained a slim 2-seat control after picking a net of 6 seats up. This came after an April 1918 special election where they flipped a seat in Wisconsin.

== Gains, losses, and holds ==
=== Retirements ===
Three Republicans and one Democrat retired instead of seeking re-election. Two Republicans retired instead of seeking election to finish the unexpired terms, one Democrat retired instead of seeking election to a full term and two Democrats retired instead of seeking election to finish the unexpired terms.

State	Senator	Replaced by
Kentucky	George B. Martin	Augustus O. Stanley
Louisiana (special)	Walter Guion	Edward J. Gay
Michigan	William Alden Smith	Truman H. Newberry
New Hampshire (special)	Irving W. Drew	George H. Moses
New Hampshire	Henry F. Hollis	Henry W. Keyes
New Jersey	David Baird	Walter E. Edge
Oregon (special)	Charles L. McNary	Frederick W. Mulkey
South Carolina (special)	Christie Benet	Nathaniel B. Dial
West Virginia	Nathan Goff Jr.	Davis Elkins

=== Defeats ===
Eight Democrats and one Republican sought re-election but lost in the primary or general election.

State	Senator	Replaced by
Colorado	John F. Shafroth	Lawrence C. Phipps
Delaware	Willard Saulsbury Jr.	L. Heisler Ball
Georgia	Thomas W. Hardwick	William J. Harris
Illinois	J. Hamilton Lewis	Medill McCormick
Kansas	William H. Thompson	Arthur Capper
Massachusetts	John W. Weeks	David I. Walsh
Mississippi	James K. Vardaman	Pat Harrison
Missouri	Xenophon P. Wilfley	Selden P. Spencer
South Carolina (special)	Christie Benet	William P. Pollock

=== Deaths ===
One Democrat died on October 21, 1917, and his seat remained vacant until an April 1918 election.

State	Senator	Replaced by
Wisconsin	Paul O. Husting	Irvine Lenroot

=== Post-election changes ===
State	Senator	Replaced by
Alabama	John H. Bankhead	Braxton B. Comer
Virginia	Thomas S. Martin	Carter Glass

Source: United States Senate Official Website

== Change in composition ==
=== Before the elections ===
		D_{1}	D_{2}	D_{3}	D_{4}	D_{5}	D_{6}	D_{7}	D_{8}
D_{18}	D_{17}	D_{16}	D_{15}	D_{14}	D_{13}	D_{12}	D_{11}	D_{10}	D_{9}
D_{19}	D_{20}	D_{21}	D_{22}	D_{23}	D_{24}	D_{25}	D_{26}	D_{27}	D_{28}
D_{38} Kan. Ran	D_{37} Ill. Ran	D_{36} Idaho; Ran	D_{35} Ga. Ran	D_{34} Del. Ran	D_{33} Colo. Ran	D_{32} Ark. Ran	D_{31} Ala. Ran	D_{30}	D_{29}
D_{39} La. (reg); Ran	D_{40} La. (sp); Ran	D_{41} Mo. (sp); Ran	D_{42} Mont. Ran	D_{43} Nev. (sp); Ran	D_{44} N.H. (reg); Retired	D_{45} N.C. Ran	D_{46} Okla. Ran	D_{47} S.C. (reg) & S.C. (sp); Ran	D_{48} Tenn. Ran
Majority →									D_{49} Va. Ran
R_{39} N.J. (sp); Ran N.J. (reg); Retired	R_{40} N.M. Ran	R_{41} Ore. (sp); Retired Ore. (reg); Ran	R_{42} R.I. Ran	R_{43} S.D. Ran	R_{44} Texas; Ran	R_{45} W.Va. Retired	D_{51} Wyo. Ran	D_{50} Wis. Died	D_{49} Va. Ran
R_{38} N.H. (sp); Retired	R_{37} Neb. Ran	R_{36} Miss. Ran	R_{35} Minn. Ran	R_{34} Mich. Retired	R_{33} Mass. Ran	R_{32} Me. Ran	R_{31} Ky. Retired	R_{30} Iowa; Ran	R_{29} Idaho (reg); Ran
R_{19}	R_{20}	R_{21}	R_{22}	R_{23}	R_{24}	R_{25}	R_{26}	R_{27}	R_{28}
R_{18}	R_{17}	R_{16}	R_{15}	R_{14}	R_{13}	R_{12}	R_{11}	R_{10}	R_{9}
		R_{1}	R_{2}	R_{3}	R_{4}	R_{5}	R_{6}	R_{7}	R_{8}

=== Elections results ===
		D_{1}	D_{2}	D_{3}	D_{4}	D_{5}	D_{6}	D_{7}	D_{8}
D_{18}	D_{17}	D_{16}	D_{15}	D_{14}	D_{13}	D_{12}	D_{11}	D_{10}	D_{9}
D_{19}	D_{20}	D_{21}	D_{22}	D_{23}	D_{24}	D_{25}	D_{26}	D_{27}	D_{28}
D_{38} Mass. Gain	D_{37} La. (sp); Hold	D_{36} La. (reg); Re-elected	D_{35} Ky. Hold	D_{34} Idaho; Elected (Note: Appointee elected)	D_{33} Ga. Hold	D_{32} Ark. Re-elected	D_{31} Ala. Re-elected	D_{30}	D_{29}
D_{39} Miss. Hold	D_{40} Mont. Re-elected	D_{41} Nev. Elected	D_{42} N.C. Re-elected	D_{43} Okla. Re-elected	D_{44} S.C. (reg) & S.C. (sp); Hold	D_{45} Tenn. Re-elected	D_{46} Texas; Re-elected	D_{47} Va. Re-elected	R_{49} Wyo. Re-elected
Majority →									R_{49} Wyo. Re-elected
R_{39} Neb. Re-elected	R_{40} N.H. (reg); Gain	R_{41} N.H. (sp); Hold	R_{42} N.J. (sp); Elected N.J. (reg); Hold	R_{43} N.M. Re-elected	R_{44} Ore. (sp); Hold Ore. (reg); Elected	R_{45} R.I. Re-elected	R_{46} S.D. Re-elected	R_{47} W.Va. Hold	R_{48} Wis. Gain
R_{38} Mo. Gain	R_{37} Minn. Re-elected	R_{36} Mich. Hold	R_{35} Me. Re-elected	R_{34} Kan. Gain	R_{33} Iowa; Re-elected	R_{32} Ill. Gain	R_{31} Idaho (reg); Re-elected	R_{30} Del. Gain	R_{29} Colo. Gain
R_{19}	R_{20}	R_{21}	R_{22}	R_{23}	R_{24}	R_{25}	R_{26}	R_{27}	R_{28}
R_{18}	R_{17}	R_{16}	R_{15}	R_{14}	R_{13}	R_{12}	R_{11}	R_{10}	R_{9}
		R_{1}	R_{2}	R_{3}	R_{4}	R_{5}	R_{6}	R_{7}	R_{8}

Key:	D_{#} / Democratic; R_{#} / Republican

== Complete list of races ==
=== Special elections during the 65th Congress ===
In these special elections, the winner was seated during 1918 or before March 4, 1919; ordered by election date.

State	Incumbent			Results	Candidates
State	Senator	Party	Electoral history	Results	Candidates
Wisconsin (Class 3)	Paul O. Husting	Democratic	1914	Incumbent died October 21, 1917. New senator elected April 2, 1918. Republican gain.	▌ ✓ Irvine Lenroot (Republican) 38.73%; ▌Joseph E. Davies (Democratic) 35.12%; ▌Victor L. Berger (Socialist) 26.09%; ▌Anthony J. Benjamin (Prohibition) 0.06%
Idaho (Class 3)	John F. Nugent	Democratic	1918 (appointed)	Interim appointee elected November 5, 1918.	▌ ✓ John F. Nugent (Democratic) 50.5%; ▌Frank R. Gooding (Republican) 49.5%
Louisiana (Class 3)	Walter Guion	Democratic	1918 (appointed)	Interim appointee retired. New senator elected November 5, 1918. Democratic hold.	▌ ✓ Edward J. Gay (Democratic); Unopposed
Missouri (Class 3)	Xenophon P. Wilfley	Democratic	1918 (appointed)	Interim appointee lost nomination. New senator elected November 5, 1918. Republican gain.	▌ ✓ Selden P. Spencer (Republican) 52.39%; ▌Joseph W. Folk (Democratic) 46.29%; Others: ▌Caleb Lipscomb (Socialist) 1.16%; ▌William Wesley Cox (Socialist Labor) 0.16%
Nevada (Class 3)	Charles Henderson	Democratic	1918 (appointed)	Interim appointee elected November 5, 1918.	▌ ✓ Charles Henderson (Democratic), 47.71%; ▌Edwin E. Roberts (Republican) 31.5%; ▌Anne Henrietta Martin (Independent) 18.01%; ▌Martin Scanlan (Socialist) 2.78%
New Hampshire (Class 3)	Irving W. Drew	Republican	1918 (appointed)	Interim appointee retired. New senator elected November 5, 1918. Republican hold.	▌ ✓ George H. Moses (Republican) 50.76%; ▌John B. Jameson (Democratic) 49.24%
New Jersey (Class 2)	David Baird	Republican	1918 (appointed)	Interim appointee elected November 5, 1918. Interim appointee was not a candidate for the next term; see below.	▌ ✓ David Baird (Republican) 49.17%; ▌Charles O. Hennessy (Democratic) 44.64%; ▌James M. Reilly (Socialist) 3.82%; ▌Grafton Day (Prohibition) 2.38%
Oregon (Class 2)	Charles L. McNary	Republican	1917 (appointed)	Interim appointee retired. New senator elected November 5, 1918. Republican hold. Interim appointee was instead elected to the next term; see below. Mulkey took the seat but subsequently resigned so McNary could be re-appointed ahead of the term.	▌ ✓ Frederick W. Mulkey (Republican) 84.53%; ▌Martha Bean (Socialist) 15.47%
South Carolina (Class 2)	Christie Benet	Democratic	1918 (appointed)	Interim appointee lost renomination. New senator elected November 5, 1918. Democratic hold. Neither the interim appointee nor the winner were elected to the next term; see below.	▌ ✓ William P. Pollock (Democratic); Unopposed

=== Elections leading to the 66th Congress ===
In these general elections, the winners were elected for the term beginning March 4, 1919; ordered by state.

All of the elections involved the Class 2 seats.

State	Incumbent			Results	Candidates
State	Senator	Party	Electoral history	Results	Candidates
Alabama	John H. Bankhead	Democratic	1907 (appointed); 1907 (special); 1911 (early)	Incumbent re-elected.	▌ ✓ John H. Bankhead (Democratic); Unopposed
Arkansas	Joseph T. Robinson	Democratic	1913	Incumbent re-elected.	▌ ✓ Joseph T. Robinson (Democratic); Unopposed
Colorado	John F. Shafroth	Democratic	1913	Incumbent lost re-election. New senator elected. Republican gain.	▌ ✓ Lawrence C. Phipps (Republican) 49.49%; ▌John F. Shafroth (Democratic) 47.94%; ▌P. A. Richardson (Prohibition) 2.58%
Delaware	Willard Saulsbury Jr.	Democratic	1913	Incumbent lost re-election. New senator elected. Republican gain.	▌ ✓ L. Heisler Ball (Republican) 51.17%; ▌Willard Saulsbury Jr. (Democratic) 47.83%; ▌William H. Connor (Socialist) 1.0%
Georgia	Thomas W. Hardwick	Democratic	1914 (special)	Incumbent lost renomination. New senator elected. Democratic hold.	▌ ✓ William J. Harris (Democratic) 88.34%; ▌G. H. Williams (Republican) 11.66%
Idaho	William Borah	Republican	1907; 1913	Incumbent re-elected.	▌ ✓ William Borah (Republican) 67.21%; ▌Frank L. Moore (Democratic) 32.79%
Illinois	J. Hamilton Lewis	Democratic	1913 (Late)	Incumbent lost re-election. New senator elected. Republican gain.	▌ ✓ Medill McCormick (Republican) 50.5%; ▌J. Hamilton Lewis (Democratic) 44.92%; ▌William B. Lloyd (Socialist) 3.91%; ▌John M. Francis (Socialist Labor) 0.34%
Iowa	William S. Kenyon	Republican	1911 (special); 1913	Incumbent re-elected.	▌ ✓ William S. Kenyon (Republican) 65.4%; ▌Charles Rollin Keyes (Democratic) 34.6%
Kansas	William H. Thompson	Democratic	1913	Incumbent lost re-election. New senator elected. Republican gain.	▌ ✓ Arthur Capper (Republican) 63.69%; ▌William H. Thompson (Democratic) 33.73%; ▌Eva Harding (Socialist) 2.58%
Kentucky	George B. Martin	Democratic	1918 (appointed)	Incumbent retired. New senator elected. Democratic hold.	▌ ✓ Augustus O. Stanley (Democratic) 50.77%; ▌Ben Bruner (Republican) 49.23%
Louisiana	Joseph E. Ransdell	Democratic	1912	Incumbent re-elected.	▌ ✓ Joseph E. Ransdell (Democratic); Unopposed
Maine	Bert M. Fernald	Republican	1916 (special)	Incumbent re-elected September 9, 1918.	▌ ✓ Bert M. Fernald (Republican) 55.4%; ▌Elmer E. Newbert (Democratic) 44.6%
Massachusetts	John W. Weeks	Republican	1913	Incumbent lost re-election. New senator elected. Democratic gain.	▌ ✓ David I. Walsh (Democratic) 49.67%; ▌John W. Weeks (Republican) 45.07%; ▌Thomas W. Lawson (Independent) 5.26%
Michigan	William Alden Smith	Republican	1911; 1913	Incumbent retired. New senator elected. Republican hold.	▌ ✓ Truman H. Newberry (Republican) 50.19%; ▌Henry Ford (Democratic) 48.47%; Others: ▌E. O. Foss (Socialist) 1.09%; ▌William Faull (Prohibition) 0.26%
Minnesota	Knute Nelson	Republican	1895; 1901; 1907; 1913	Incumbent re-elected.	▌ ✓ Knute Nelson (Republican) 60.05%; ▌Willis G. Calderwood (National) 39.95%
Mississippi	James K. Vardaman	Democratic	1912	Incumbent lost renomination. New senator elected.	▌ ✓ Pat Harrison (Democratic) 95.04%; ▌Summer W. Rose (Socialist) 4.96%
Montana	Thomas J. Walsh	Democratic	1913	Incumbent re-elected.	▌ ✓ Thomas J. Walsh (Democratic) 41.07%; ▌Oscar Lanstrum (Republican) 35.79%; ▌Jeannette Rankin (National) 23.14%
Nebraska	George W. Norris	Republican	1913	Incumbent re-elected.	▌ ✓ George W. Norris (Republican) 54.52%; ▌John H. Morehead (Democratic) 45.49%
New Hampshire	Henry F. Hollis	Democratic	1913	Incumbent retired. New senator elected. Republican gain.	▌ ✓ Henry W. Keyes (Republican) 53.54%; ▌Eugene E. Reed (Democratic) 46.46%
New Jersey	David Baird	Republican	1918 (appointed)	Interim appointee retired. New senator elected. Republican hold. Interim appointee (Baird) was elected to finish the current term; see above.	▌ ✓ Walter E. Edge (Republican) 50.34%; ▌George M. La Monte (Democratic) 43.23%; ▌James M. Reilly (Socialist) 4.14%; Others: ▌Grafton Day (Prohibition) 1.62%; ▌William J. Wallace (Single Tax) 0.66%
New Mexico	Albert B. Fall	Republican	1912 (new state); 1912 (Invalidated); 1913	Incumbent re-elected.	▌ ✓ Albert B. Fall (Republican) 51.4%; ▌William B. Walton (Democratic) 47.48%; ▌W. P. Metcalf (Socialist) 1.12%
North Carolina	F. M. Simmons	Democratic	1901; 1907; 1913	Incumbent re-elected.	▌ ✓ F. M. Simmons (Democratic) 60.5%; ▌John M. Morehead (Republican) 39.5%
Oklahoma	Robert L. Owen	Democratic	1907 (New state); 1913	Incumbent re-elected.	▌ ✓ Robert L. Owen (Democratic) 55.44%; ▌W. B. Johnson (Republican) 40.73%; ▌C. M. Greenland (Socialist) 3.83%
Oregon	Charles L. McNary	Republican	1917 (appointed)	Interim appointee elected to the next term but not to finish the term. Winner appointed to begin next term early when winner of the special election (see above) resigned.	▌ ✓ Charles L. McNary (Republican) 54.17%; ▌Oswald West (Democratic) 42.3%; ▌Albert Slaughter (Socialist) 3.53%
Rhode Island	LeBaron B. Colt	Republican	1913	Incumbent re-elected.	▌ ✓ LeBaron B. Colt (Republican) 51.76%; ▌George F. O'Shaunessy (Democratic) 46.24%; ▌Frederick W. Hunt (Socialist) 2.0%
South Carolina	Christie Benet	Democratic	1918 (appointed)	Interim appointee retired. New senator elected. Democratic hold. Neither the interim appointee nor the winner were elected to finish the current term; see above.	▌ ✓ Nathaniel B. Dial (Democratic); Unopposed
South Dakota	Thomas Sterling	Republican	1913	Incumbent re-elected.	▌ ✓ Thomas Sterling (Republican) 55.07%; ▌W. T. Rinehart (Democratic) 38.95%; ▌Orville Rafferty (Independent) 5.98%
Tennessee	John K. Shields	Democratic	1913	Incumbent re-elected.	▌ ✓ John K. Shields (Democratic) 62.17%; ▌H. Clay Evans (Republican) 37.83%
Texas	Morris Sheppard	Democratic	1913 (special)	Incumbent re-elected.	▌ ✓ Morris Sheppard (Democratic) 86.69%; ▌J. Webster Flanagan (Republican) 12.41%; ▌M. A. Smith (Socialist) 0.9%
Virginia	Thomas S. Martin	Democratic	1893 (early); 1899 (early); 1906; 1912	Incumbent re-elected.	▌ ✓ Thomas S. Martin (Democratic); Unopposed
West Virginia	Nathan Goff Jr.	Republican	1913	Incumbent retired. New senator elected. Republican hold.	▌ ✓ Davis Elkins (Republican) 53.53%; ▌Clarence W. Watson (Democratic) 45.4%; ▌D. M. S. Holt (Socialist) 1.06%
Wyoming	Francis E. Warren	Republican	1890; 1893 (lost); 1895; 1901; 1907; 1913	Incumbent re-elected.	▌ ✓ Francis E. Warren (Republican) 57.77%; ▌John Eugene Osborne (Democratic) 42.23%

== Closest races ==
Eighteen races had a margin of victory under 10%:

State	Party of winner	Margin
Idaho (special)	Democratic	1.0%
New Hampshire (special)	Republican	1.52% (Note: New Hampshire (special) was the "tipping-point state".)
Kentucky	Democratic	1.54%
Colorado	Republican (flip)	1.55%
Michigan	Republican	1.72%
Delaware	Republican (flip)	3.34%
Wisconsin (special)	Republican (flip)	3.61%
New Mexico	Republican	3.92%
New Jersey (special)	Republican	4.53%
Massachusetts	Democratic (flip)	4.6%
Montana	Democratic	5.28%
Rhode Island	Republican	5.52%
Illinois	Republican (flip)	5.58%
Missouri (special)	Republican (flip)	6.1%
New Hampshire	Republican (flip)	7.08%
New Jersey	Republican	7.11%
West Virginia	Republican	8.13%
Nebraska	Republican	9.03%

== Alabama ==
1918 United States Senate election in Alabama
- November 5, 1918
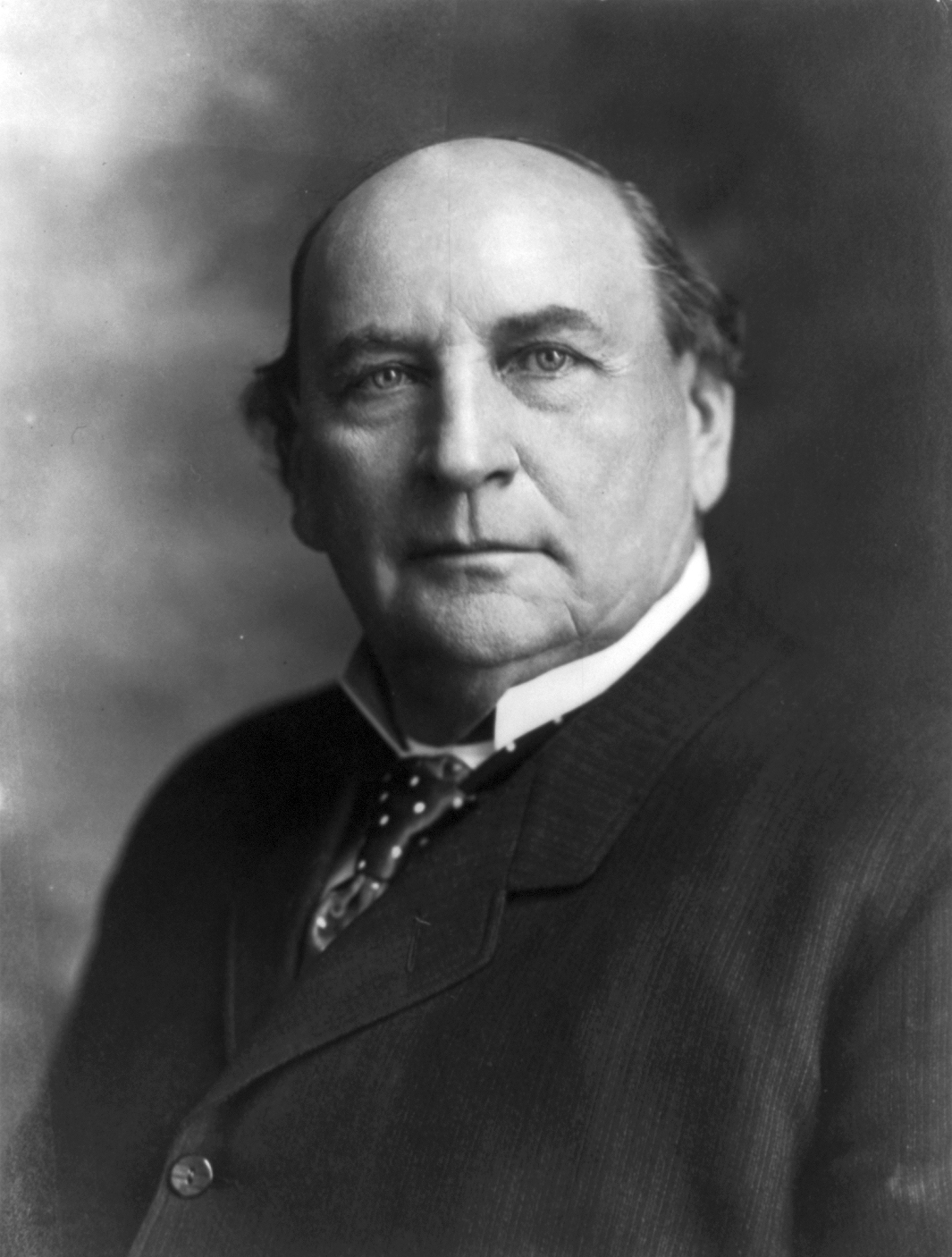
Nominee	John H. Bankhead
Party	Democratic
Popular vote	54,880
Percentage	100.00%
- Bankhead: 50–60% 60–70% 70–80% 80–90% 90–100% White: 50–60% 60–70% 70–80%
U.S. senator before election
John H. Bankhead
Democratic
Elected U.S. senator
John H. Bankhead
Democratic

Alabama primary
Party	Candidate	Votes	%
Democratic	John H. Bankhead (incumbent)	59,387	55.62
Democratic	Frank White	47,381	44.38
Total votes		106,768	100.00
Democratic hold			

Alabama election
Party	Candidate	Votes	%
Democratic	John H. Bankhead (incumbent)	54,880	100.00
Total votes		54,880	100.00

== Arkansas ==
1918 United States Senate election in Arkansas
- November 5, 1918
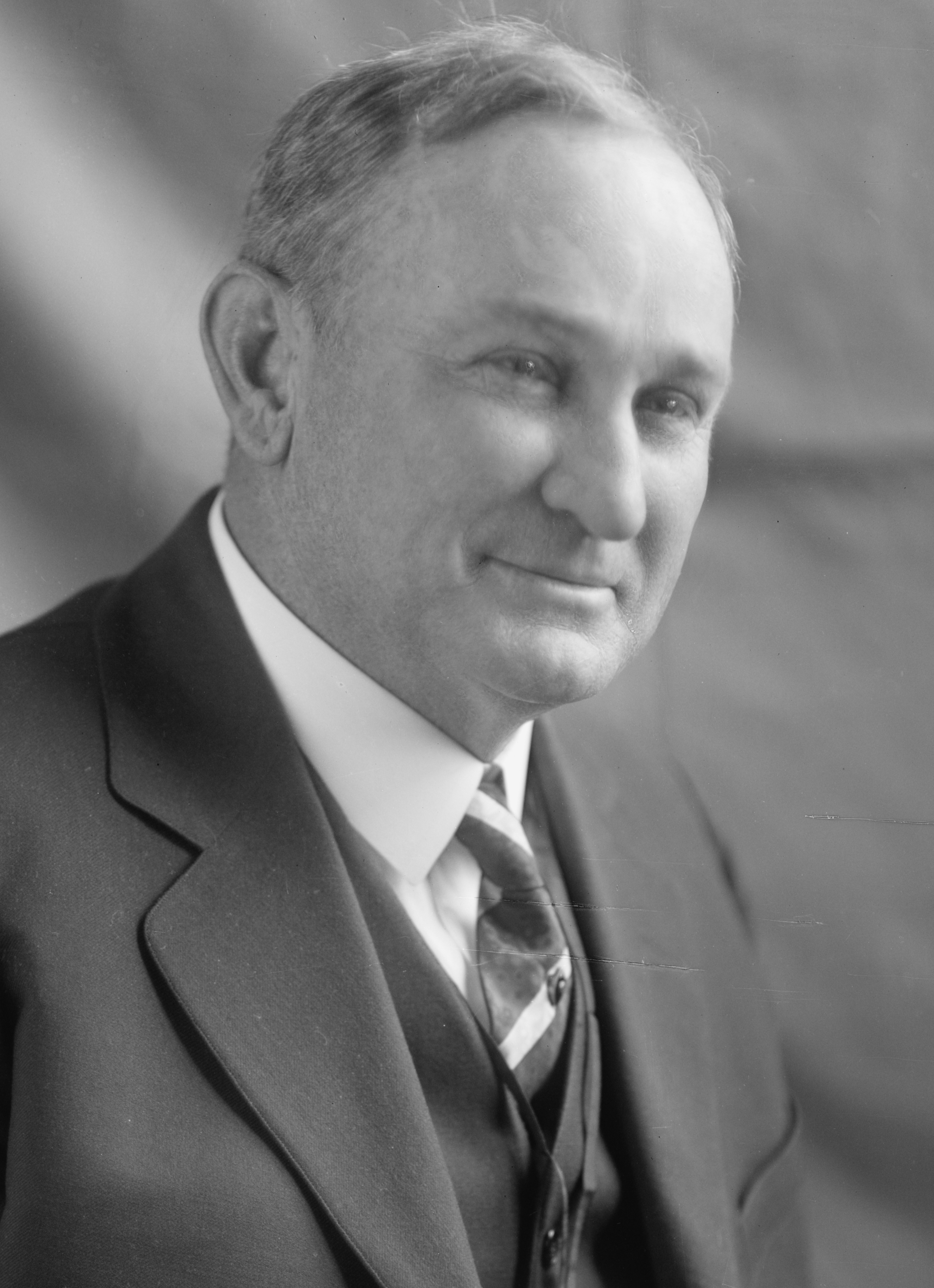
Nominee	Joseph T. Robinson
Party	Democratic
Popular vote	78,377
Percentage	100.00%
- County results Robinson: 90–100%
U.S. senator before election
Joseph T. Robinson
Democratic
Elected U.S. senator
Joseph T. Robinson
Democratic

Arkansas election
Party	Candidate	Votes	%
Democratic	Joseph T. Robinson (incumbent)	78,377	100.00
Total votes		78,377	100.00
Democratic hold			

== Colorado ==
1918 United States Senate election in Colorado
- November 5, 1918
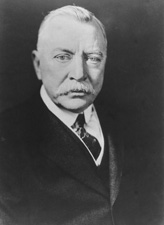

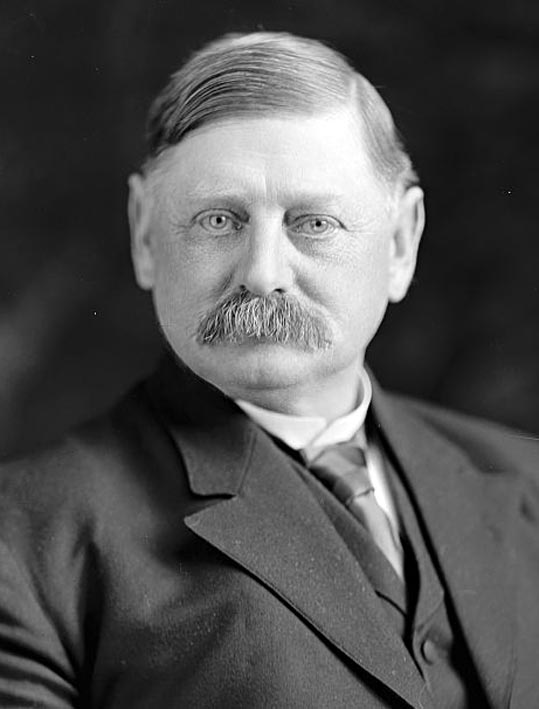
Nominee	Lawrence C. Phipps	John F. Shafroth
Party	Republican	Democratic
Popular vote	107,726	104,347
Percentage	49.49%	47.94%
- County results Phipps: 40–50% 50–60% Shafroth: 40–50% 50–60% 60–70% 70–80%
U.S. senator before election
John F. Shafroth
Democratic
Elected U.S. Senator
Lawrence C. Phipps
Republican

Colorado election
Party	Candidate	Votes	%
Republican	Lawrence C. Phipps	107,726	49.49
Democratic	John F. Shafroth (incumbent)	104,347	47.94
Prohibition	P. A. Richardson	5,606	2.58
Majority		3,379	1.55
Total votes		217,679	100.00
Republican gain from Democratic			

== Delaware ==
1918 United States Senate election in Delaware
- November 5, 1918
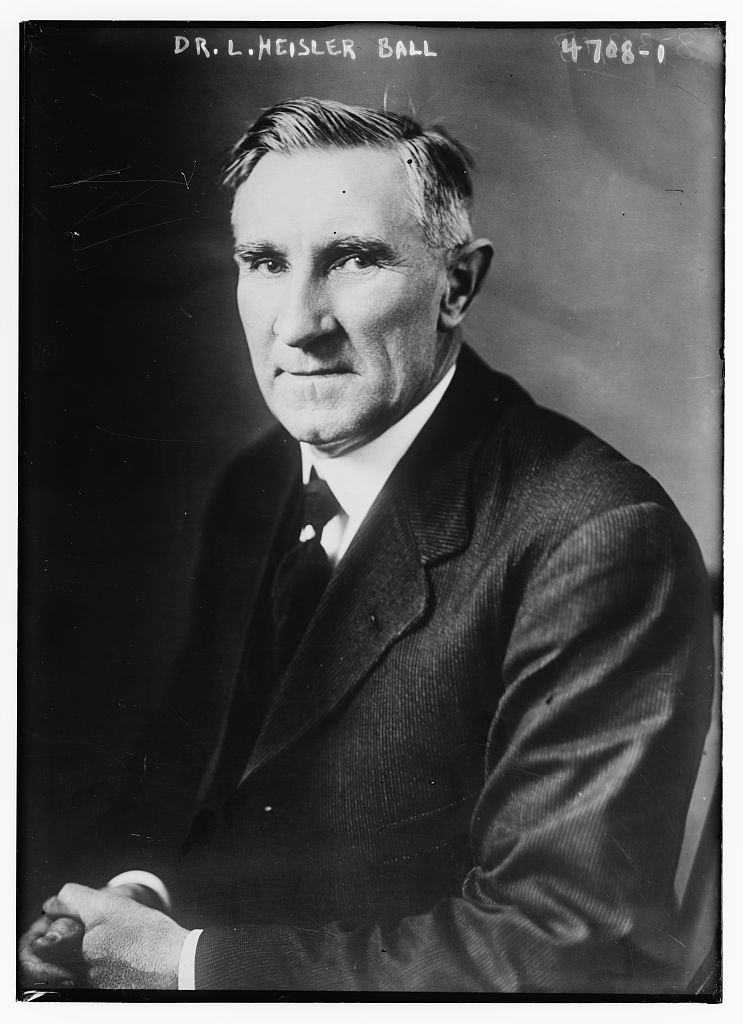

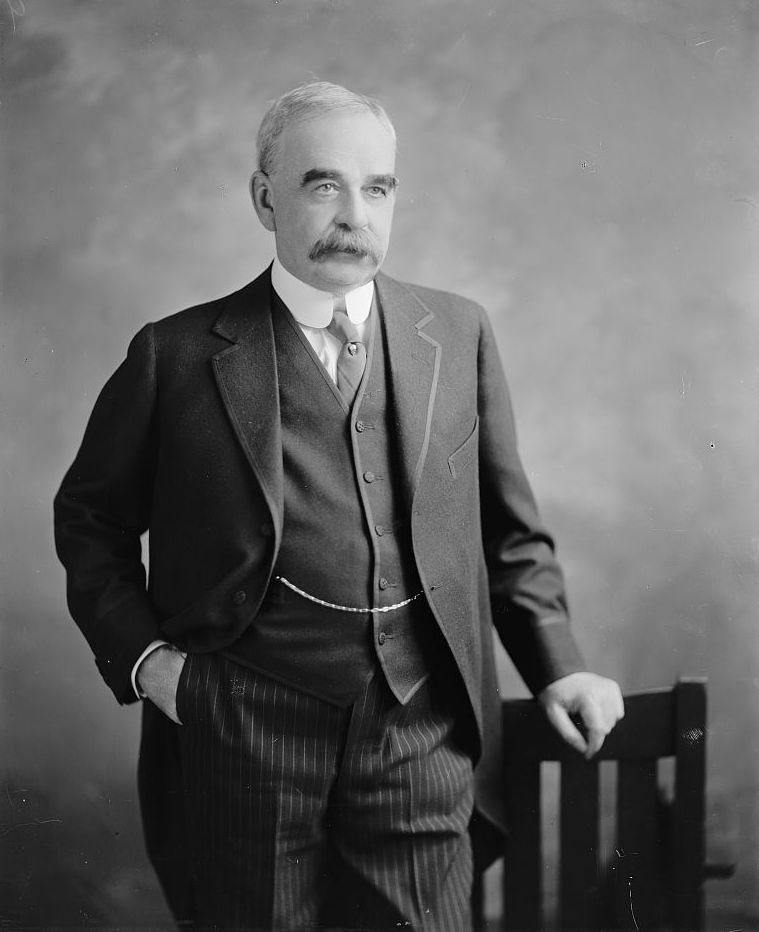
Nominee	L. Heisler Ball	Willard Saulsbury Jr.
Party	Republican	Democratic
Popular vote	21,519	20,113
Percentage	51.17%	47.83%
U.S. senator before election
Willard Saulsbury Jr.
Democratic
Elected U.S. senator
L. Heisler Ball
Republican

== Georgia ==
1918 United States Senate election in Georgia
- November 5, 1918
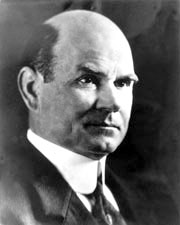

Nominee	William J. Harris	G. H. Williams
Party	Democratic	Republican
Popular vote	53,731	7,078
Percentage	88.34%	11.66%
U.S. senator before election
Thomas W. Hardwick
Democratic
Elected U.S. senator
William J. Harris
Democratic

== Idaho ==
=== Idaho (regular) ===
1918 United States Senate election in Idaho
- November 5, 1918
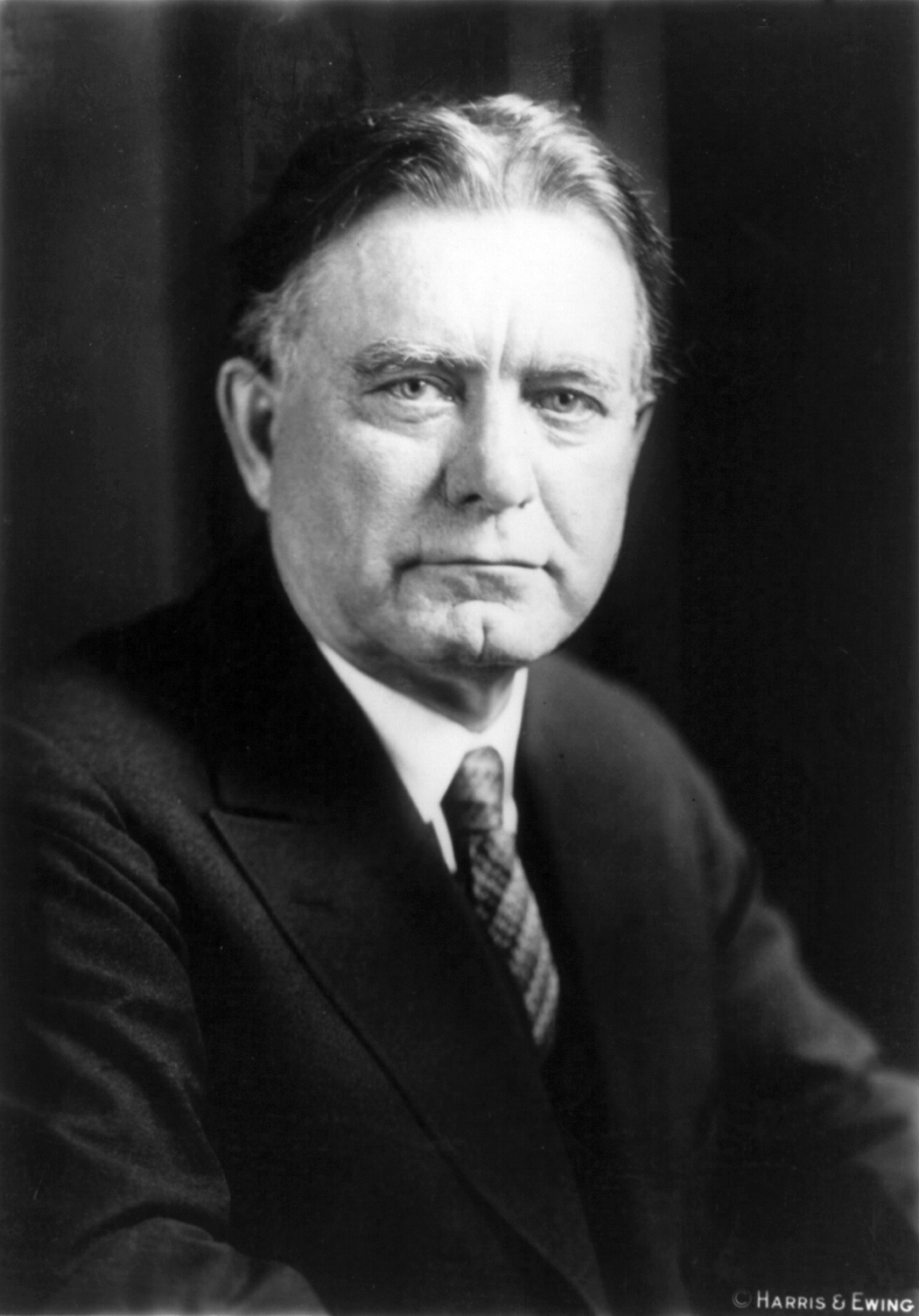

Nominee	William Borah	Frank L. Moore
Party	Republican	Democratic
Popular vote	63,587	31,018
Percentage	67.21%	32.79%
- County results Borah: 50–60% 60–70% 70–80% Moore: 50–60%
U.S. senator before election
William Borah
Republican
Elected U.S. senator
William Borah
Republican

=== Idaho (special) ===
1918 United States Senate special election in Idaho
- November 5, 1918
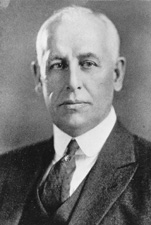

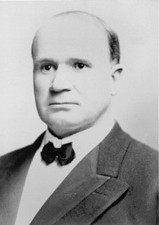
Nominee	John F. Nugent	Frank R. Gooding
Party	Democratic	Republican
Popular vote	48,467	47,497
Percentage	50.50%	49.50%
- County results Nugent: 50–60% 60–70% Gooding: 50–60% 60–70%
U.S. senator before election
John F. Nugent
Democratic
Elected U.S. senator
John F. Nugent
Democratic

Incumbent Democratic Senator John Frost Nugent defeated Republican nominee Frank Robert Gooding by a very narrow margin of 1.00% and by 970 votes. Upon his election, John Frost Nugent became the first Democrat ever to have been elected to the United States Senate in Idaho or from Idaho and the first non-Republican to win a United States Senate seat in Idaho or from Idaho since 1901 and the first non-Republican to win the Class 3 Senate seat in Idaho or from Idaho since 1897.

== Illinois ==
1918 United States Senate election in Illinois
- November 5, 1918
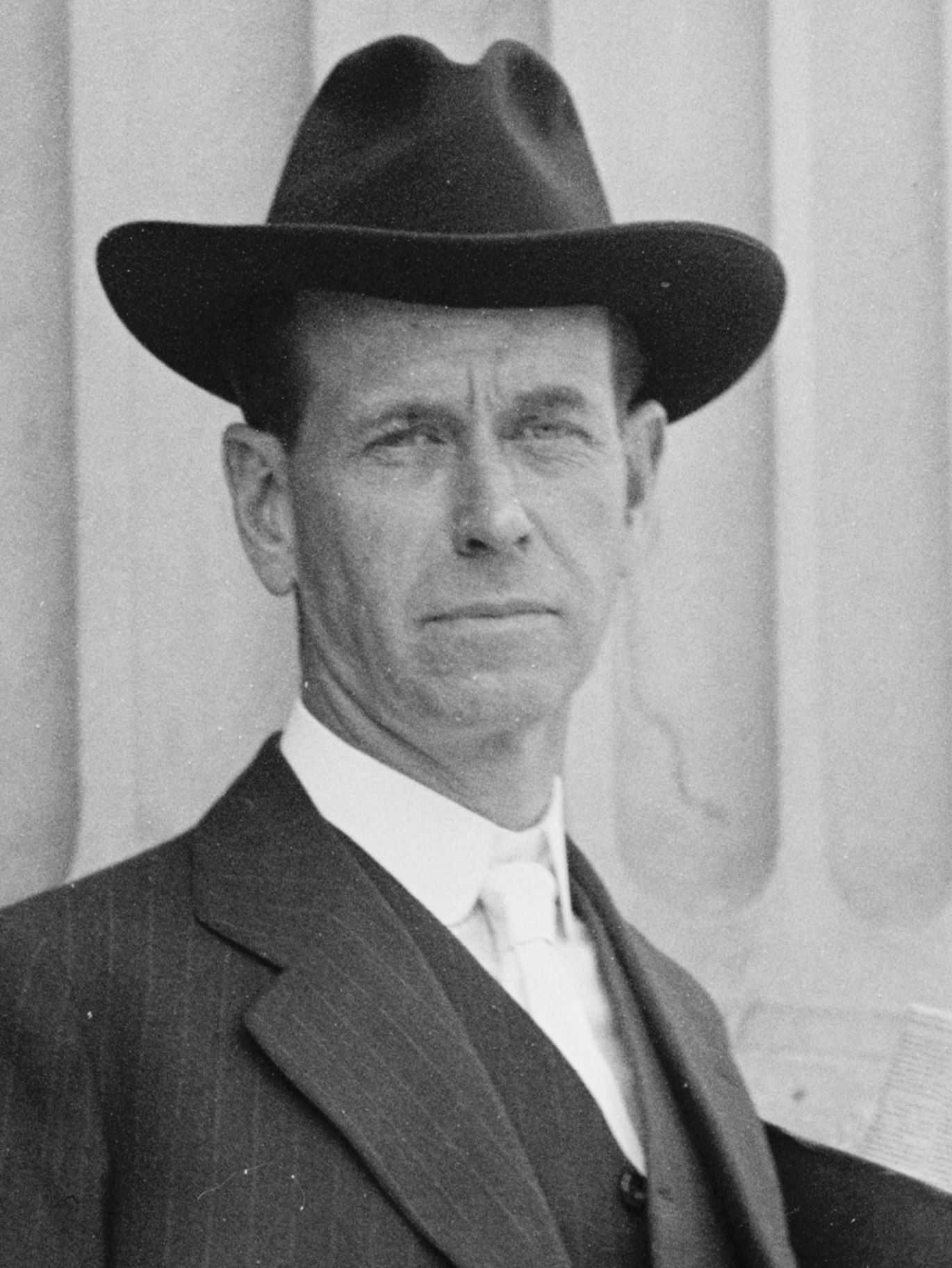

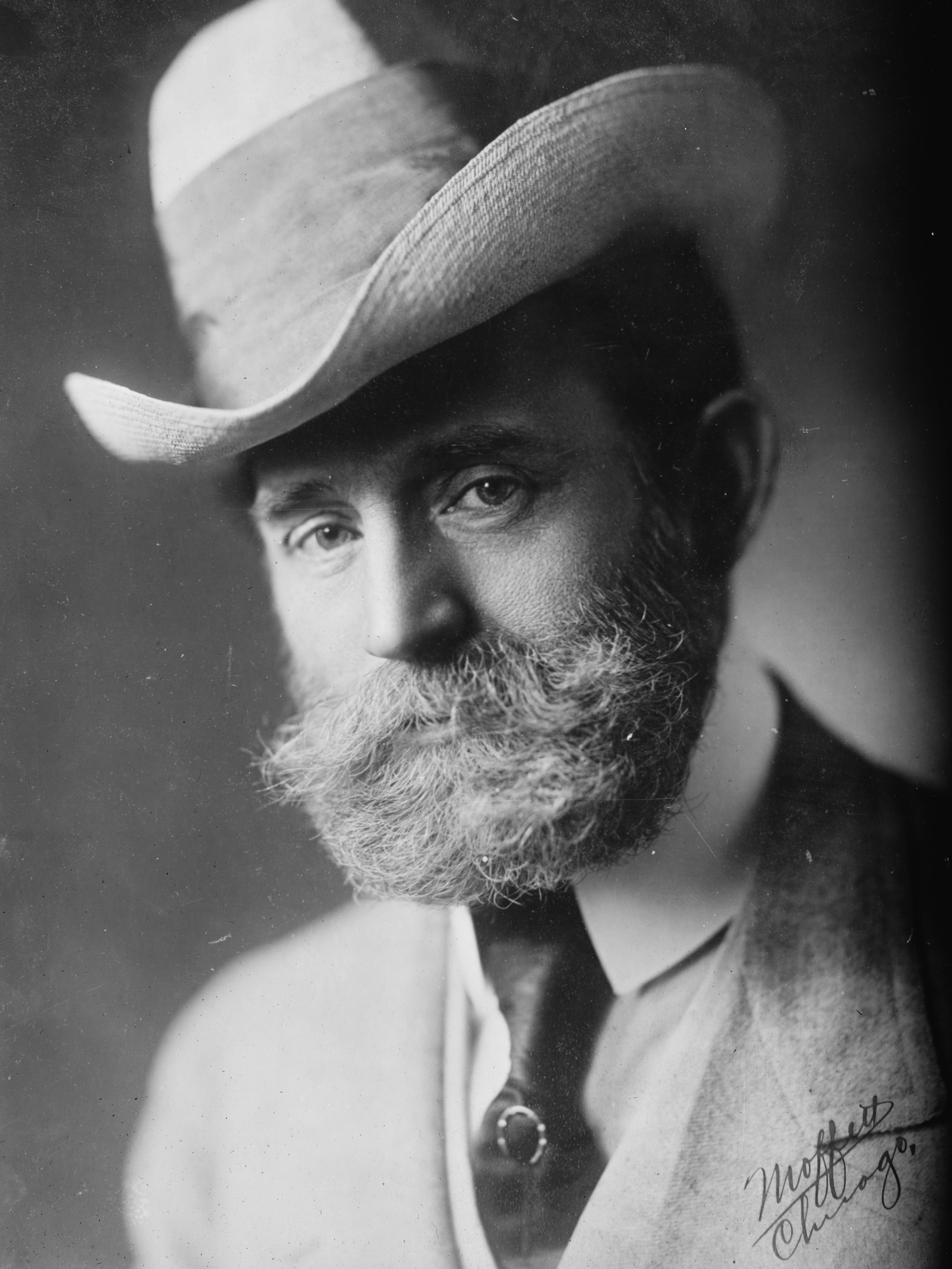
Nominee	Medill McCormick	J. Hamilton Lewis
Party	Republican	Democratic
Popular vote	479,967	426,943
Percentage	50.50%	44.92%
- Results by county McCormick: 40–50% 50–60% 60–70% 70–80% 80–90% Lewis: 40–50% 50–60% 60–70%
U.S. senator before election
J. Hamilton Lewis
Democratic
Elected U.S. senator
Medill McCormick
Republican

Illinois election
Party	Candidate	Votes	%
Republican	Medill McCormick	479,983	50.50
Democratic	James Hamilton Lewis (incumbent)	426,943	44.92
Socialist	William Bross Lloyd	37,167	3.91
Socialist Labor	John M. Francis	3,268	0.34
Prohibition	Frank B. Vennum	3,151	0.33
Majority		53,024	5.58
Turnout		950,496	
Republican gain from Democratic			

== Iowa ==
1918 United States Senate election in Iowa
- November 5, 1918
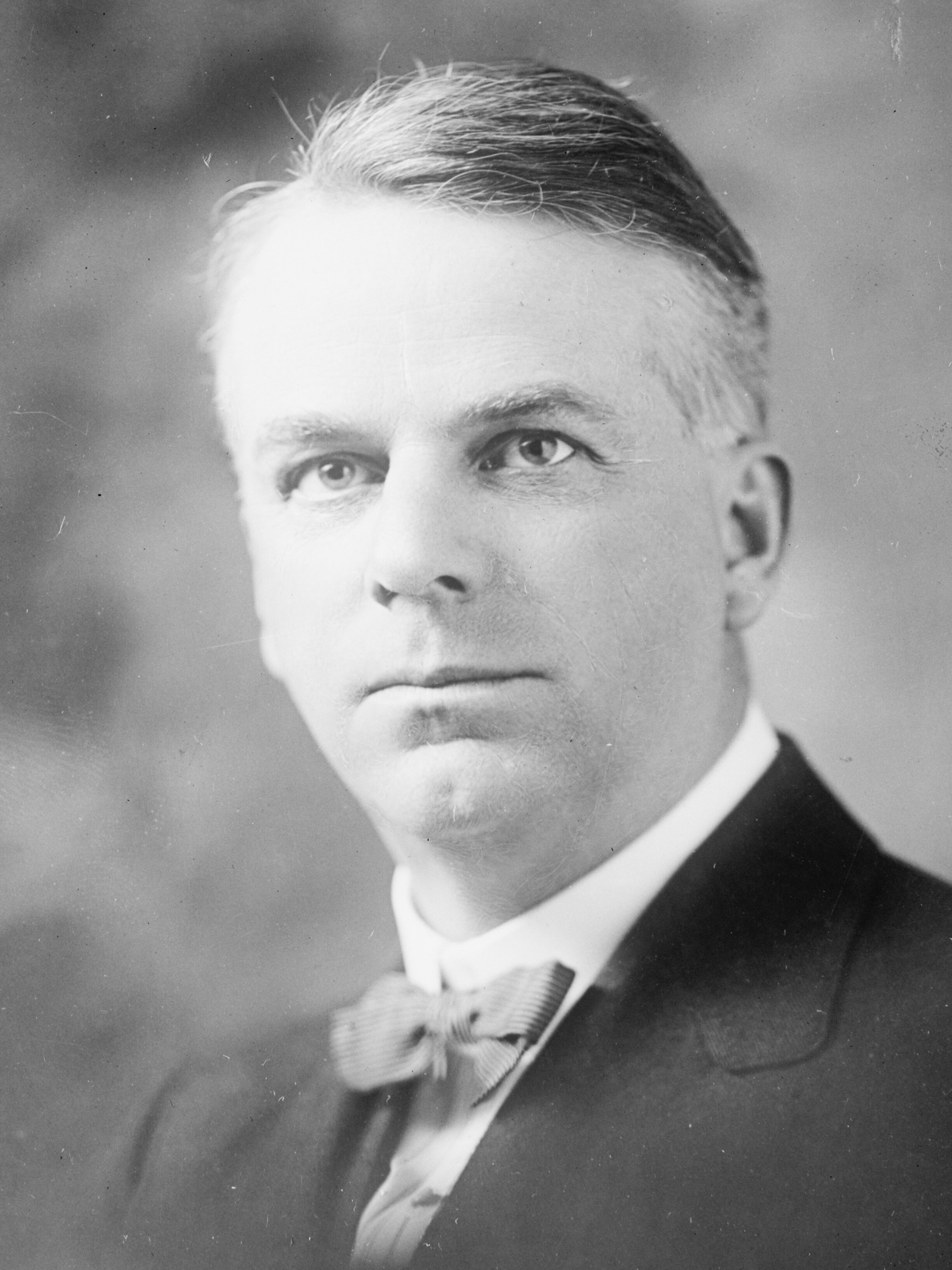

Nominee	William S. Kenyon	Charles R. Keyes
Party	Republican	Democratic
Popular vote	230,264	121,830
Percentage	65.4%	34.6%
- Results by county Kenyon: 50–60% 60–70% 70–80% 80–90% Keyes: 50–60%
[[List of United States senators from {{{country}}}|U.S. senator]] before election
William S. Kenyon
Republican
Elected U.S. Senator
William S. Kenyon
Republican

== Kansas ==
1918 United States Senate election in Kansas
- November 5, 1918
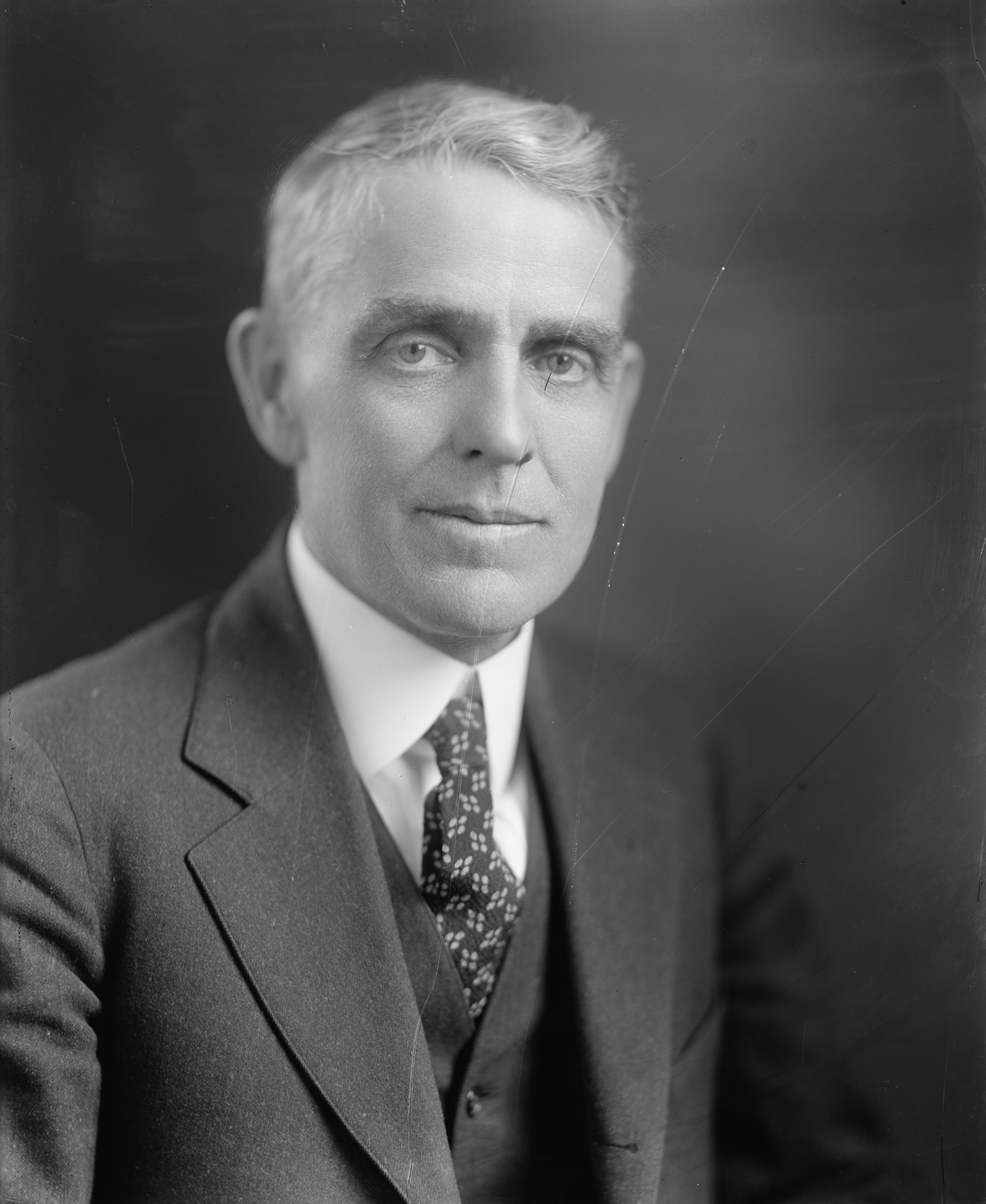

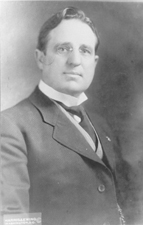
Nominee	Arthur Capper	William Howard Thompson
Party	Republican	Democratic
Popular vote	281,931	149,300
Percentage	63.69%	33.73%
- Results by county Capper: 40–50% 50–60% 60–70% 70–80% 80–90% Thompson: 40–50% 50–60%
[[List of United States senators from {{{country}}}|U.S. senator]] before election
William Howard Thompson
Democratic
Elected U.S. senator
Arthur Capper
Republican

== Kentucky ==
1918 United States Senate election in Kentucky
- November 5, 1918
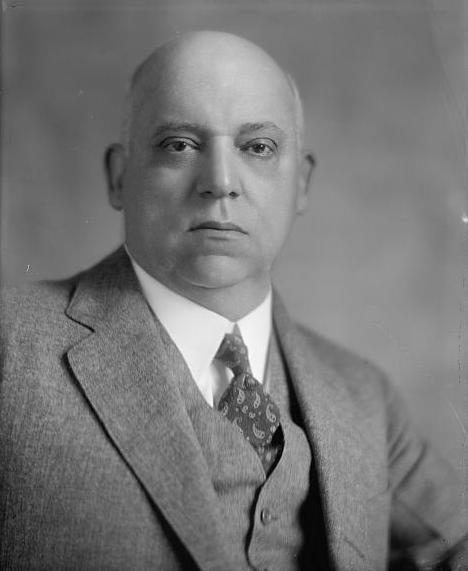

Nominee	Augustus O. Stanley	Ben Bruner
Party	Democratic	Republican
Popular vote	184,385	178,797
Percentage	50.77%	49.23%
- County results Stanley: 50–60% 60–70% 70–80% 80–90% Bruner: 50–60% 60–70% 70–80% 80–90% >90%
U.S. senator before election
George Brown Martin
Democratic
Elected U.S. senator
Augustus O. Stanley
Democratic

== Louisiana ==
=== Louisiana (regular) ===
1918 United States Senate election in Louisiana
- November 5, 1918
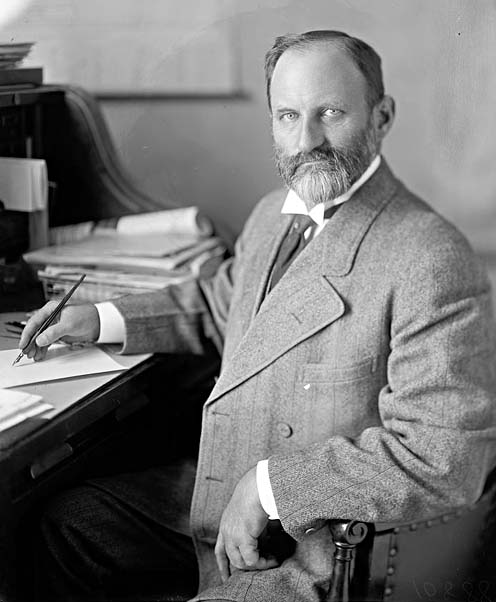
Nominee	Joseph E. Ransdell
Party	Democratic
Popular vote	44,224
Percentage	100%
- Parish results Ransdell: 90–100%
U.S. senator before election
Joseph E. Ransdell
Democratic
Elected U.S. senator
Joseph E. Ransdell
Democratic

=== Louisiana (special) ===
1918 United States Senate special election in Louisiana
- September 10, 1918
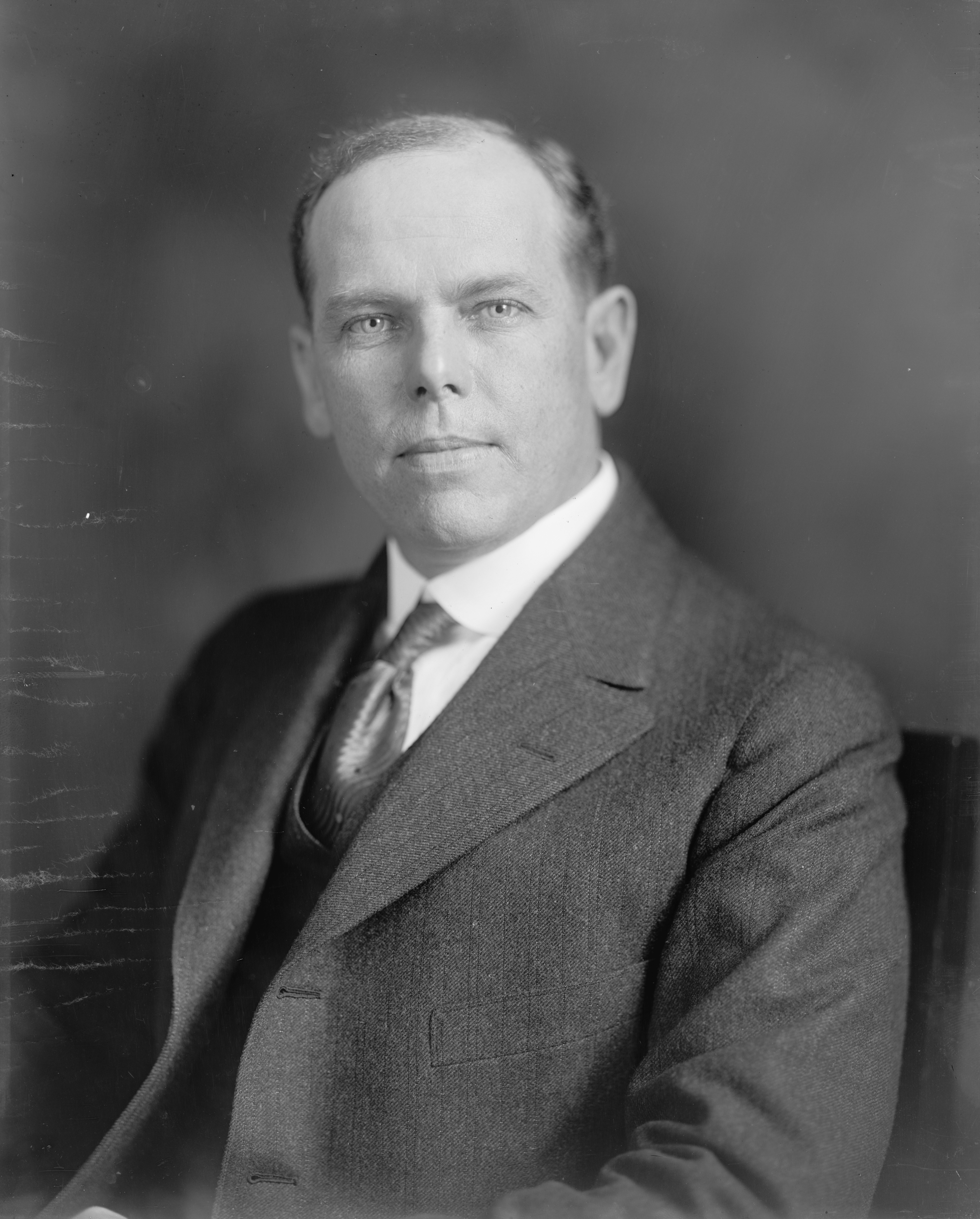
Nominee	Edward James Gay Jr.
Party	Democratic
Popular vote	44,345
Percentage	100%
- Parish results Gay: 90–100%
U.S. senator before election
Walter Guion
Democratic
Elected U.S. senator
Edward James Gay Jr.
Democratic

== Maine ==
1918 United States Senate election in Maine
- September 9, 1918
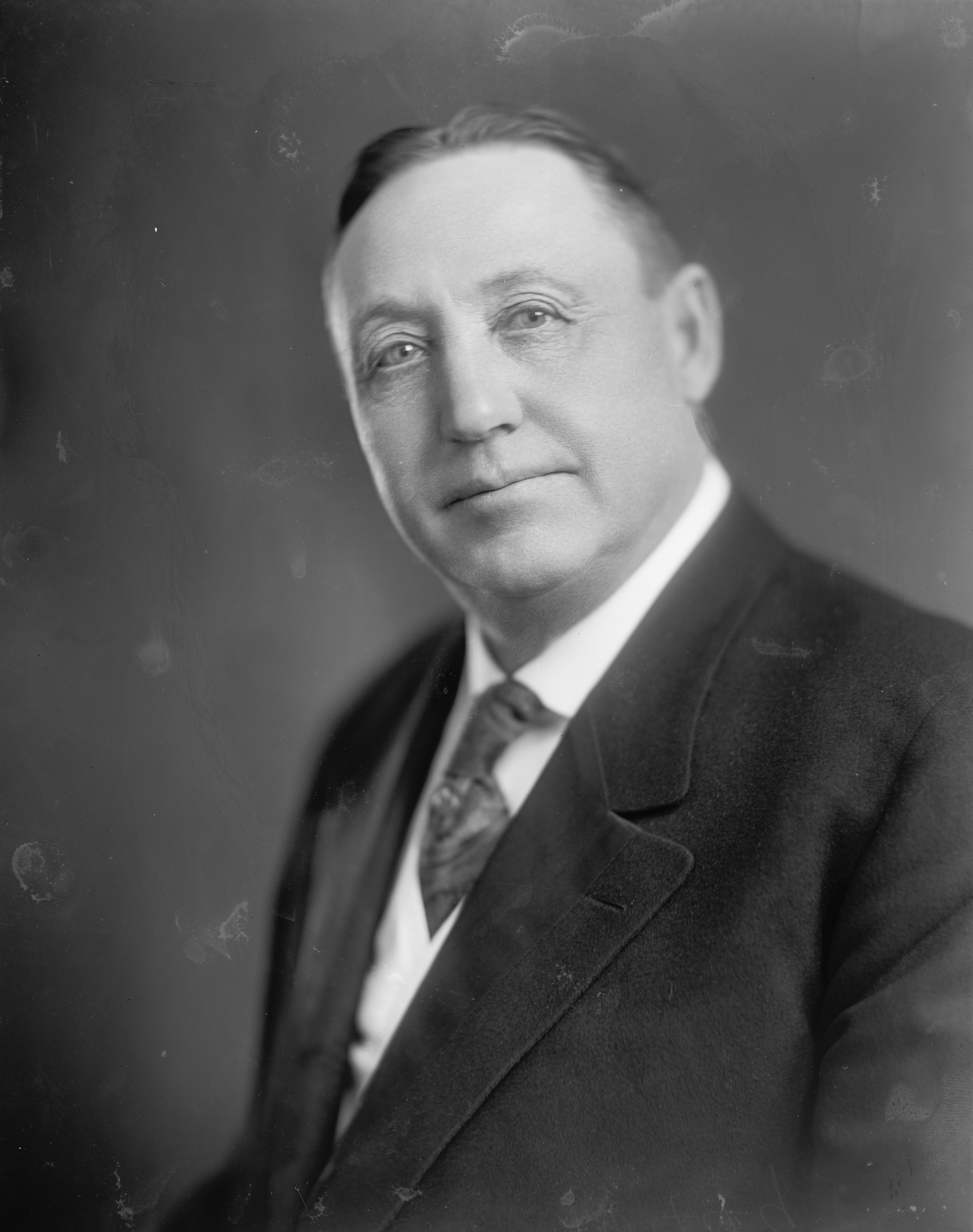

Nominee	Bert Fernald	Elmer E. Newbert
Party	Republican	Democratic
Popular vote	67,431	54,289
Percentage	55.40%	44.60%
- County results Fernald: 50–60% 60–70% Newbert: 50–60%
U.S. senator before election
Bert Fernald
Republican
Elected U.S. Senator
Bert Fernald
Republican

== Massachusetts ==
1918 United States Senate election in Massachusetts
- November 5, 1918
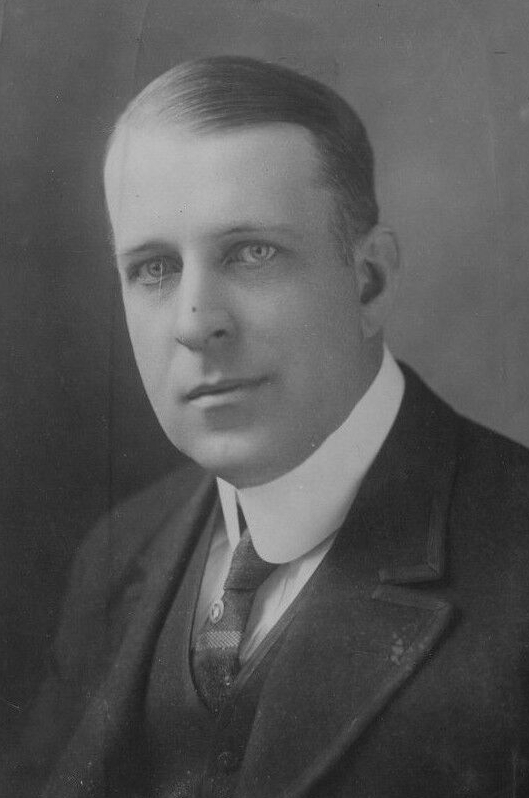

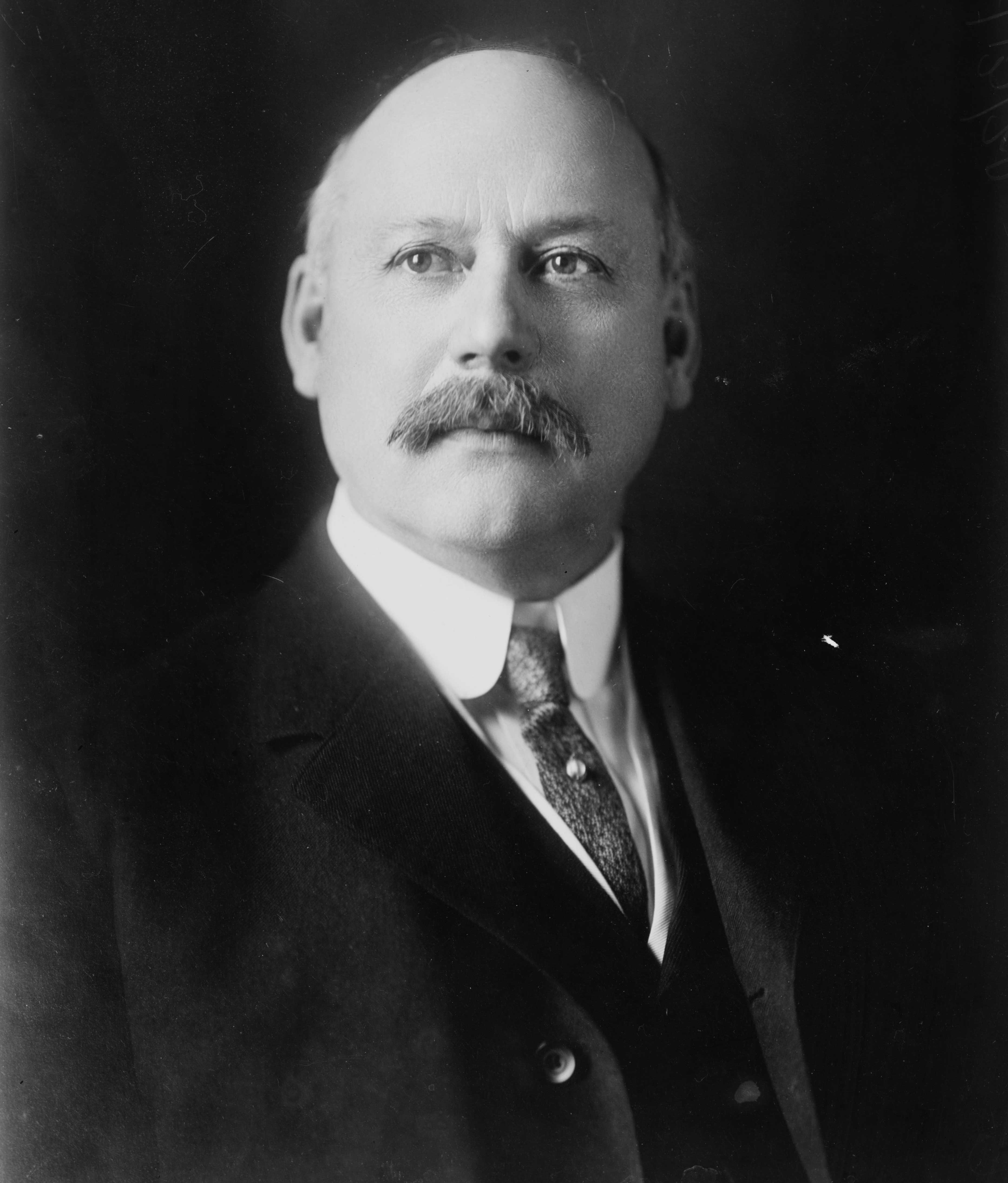

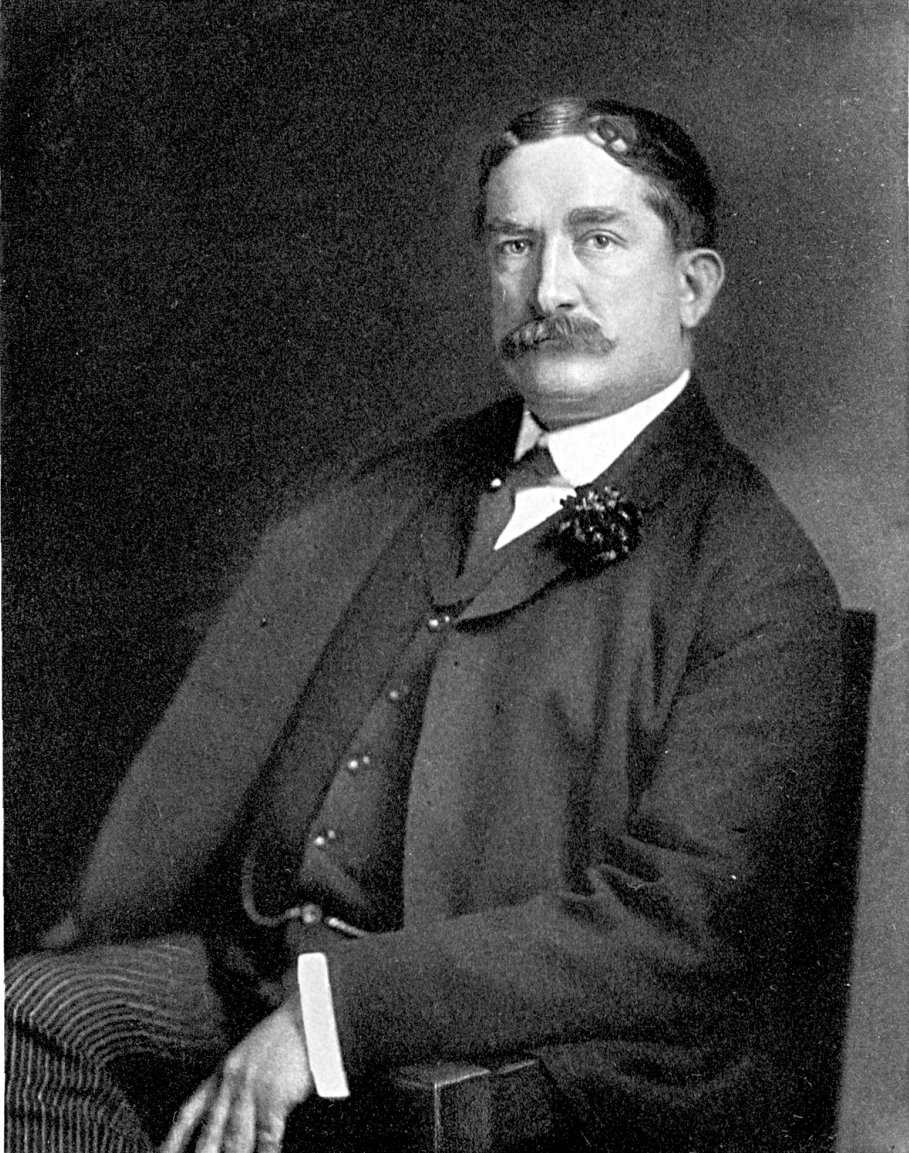
Nominee	David I. Walsh	John W. Weeks	Thomas W. Lawson
Party	Democratic	Republican	Independent
Popular vote	207,478	188,287	21,985
Percentage	49.66%	45.06%	5.26%
- County results Walsh: 40–50% 50–60% 60–70% Weeks: 40–50% 50–60% 60–70%
Senator before election
John W. Weeks
Republican
Elected Senator
David I. Walsh
Democratic

== Michigan ==
1918 United States Senate election in Michigan
- November 5, 1918
- Turnout: 15.60%
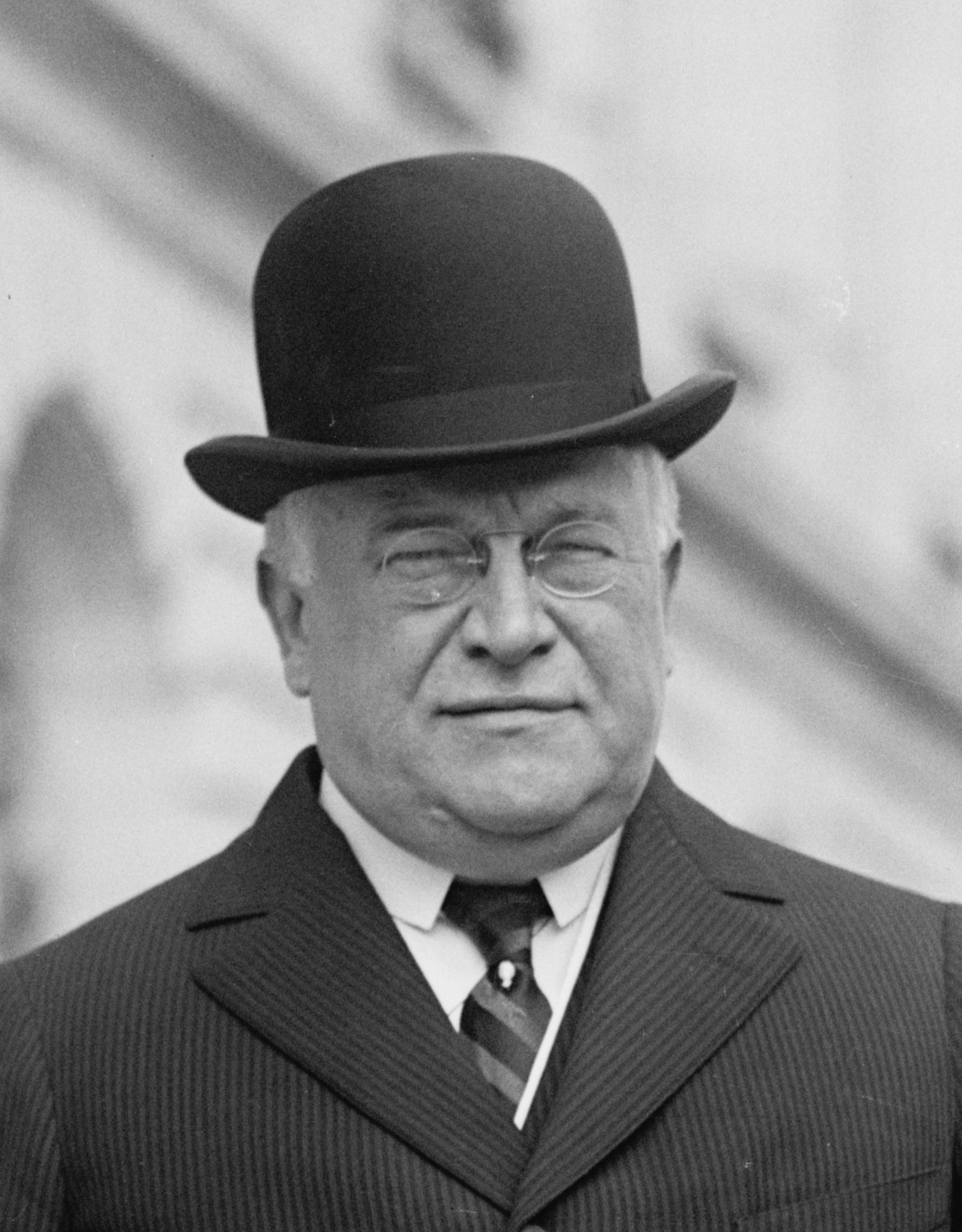

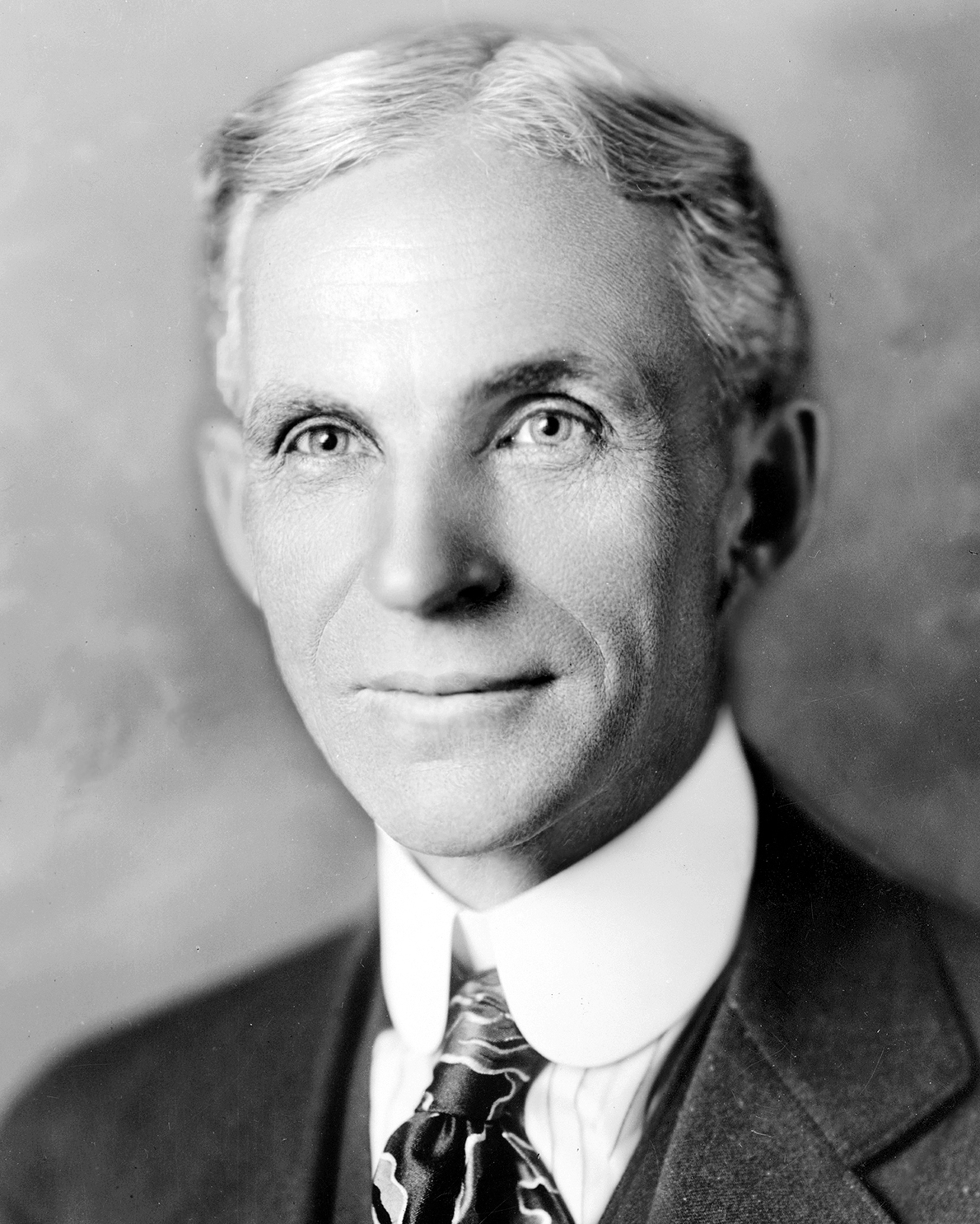
Nominee	Truman Newberry	Henry Ford
Party	Republican	Democratic
Popular vote	220,054	212,487
Percentage	50.19%	48.47%
- County Results Newberry: 40–50% 50–60% 60–70% 70–80% Ford: 40–50% 50–60% 60–70%
U.S. senator before election
William Alden Smith
Republican
Elected U.S. Senator
Truman Handy Newberry
Republican

1918 United States Senate election in Michigan
Republican	Truman H. Newberry	220,054	50.19%
Democratic	Henry Ford	212,487	48.47%
Socialist	Edward O. Foss	4,763	1.09%
Prohibition	William J. Faull	1,133	0.26%
Party	Candidate	Votes	%
Majority		7,567	1.72
Total votes		438,437	100.00
Republican hold			

== Minnesota ==
1918 United States Senate election in Minnesota
- November 5, 1918
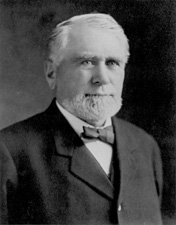

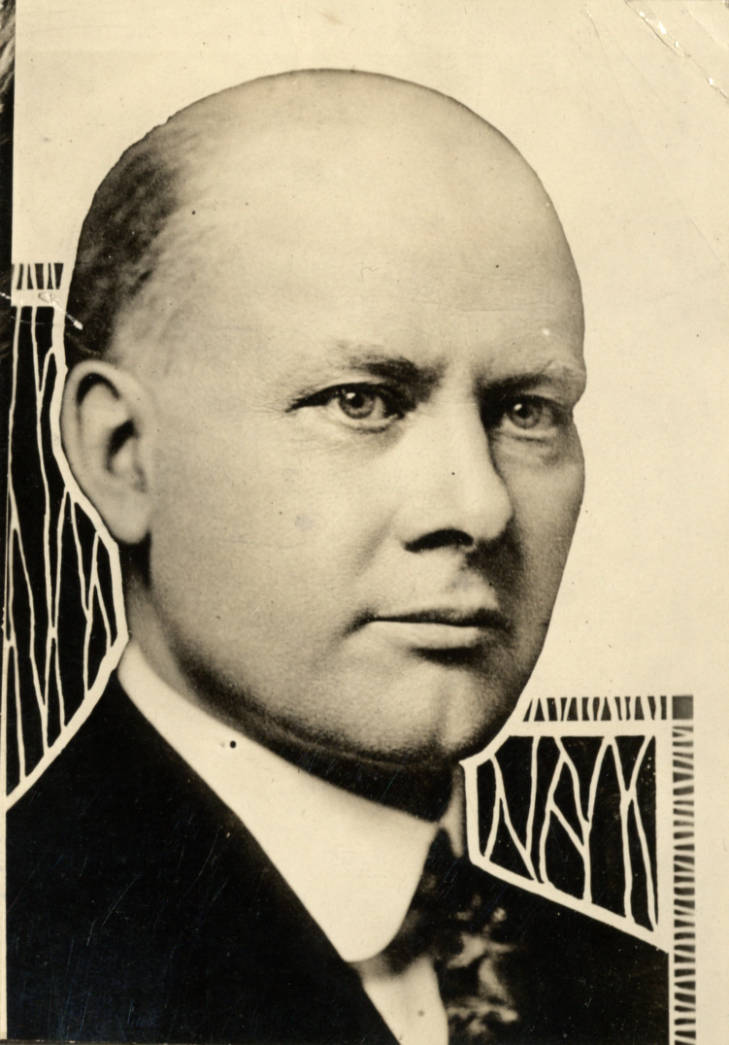
Nominee	Knute Nelson	Willis Calderwood
Party	Republican	National
Popular vote	206,428	137,334
Percentage	60.05%	39.95%
- County results Nelson: 50–60% 60–70% 70–80% Calderwood: 50–60% 60–70%
U.S. senator before election
Knute Nelson
Republican
Elected U.S. senator
Knute Nelson
Republican

Minnesota election
Party	Candidate	Votes	%
Republican	Knute Nelson (incumbent)	206,428	60.05
National	Willis Calderwood	137,334	39.95
Majority		69,094	20.10
Total votes		343,762	100.00
Republican hold			

== Mississippi ==
1918 U.S. Senate Democratic primary in Mississippi
- August 20, 1918
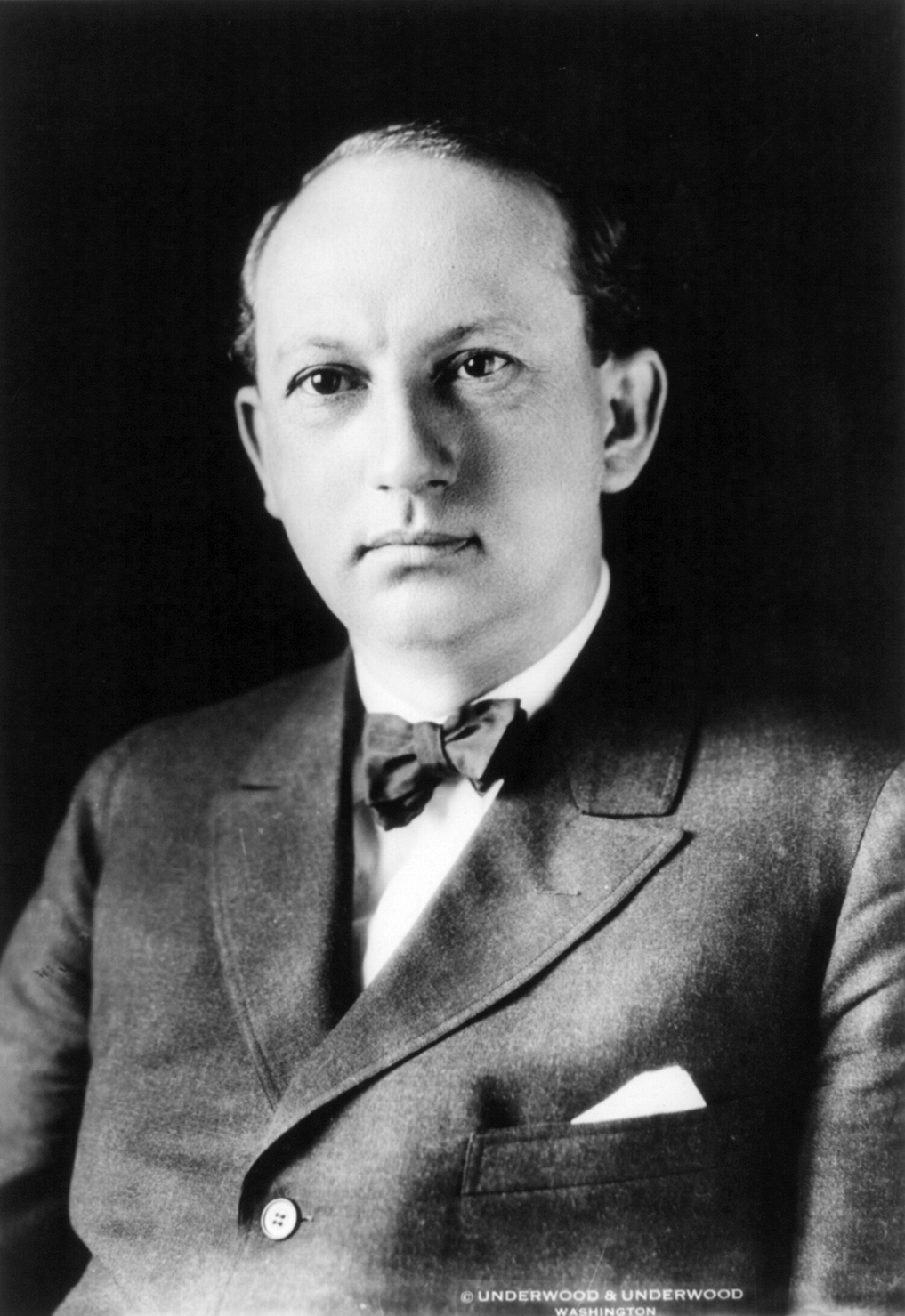

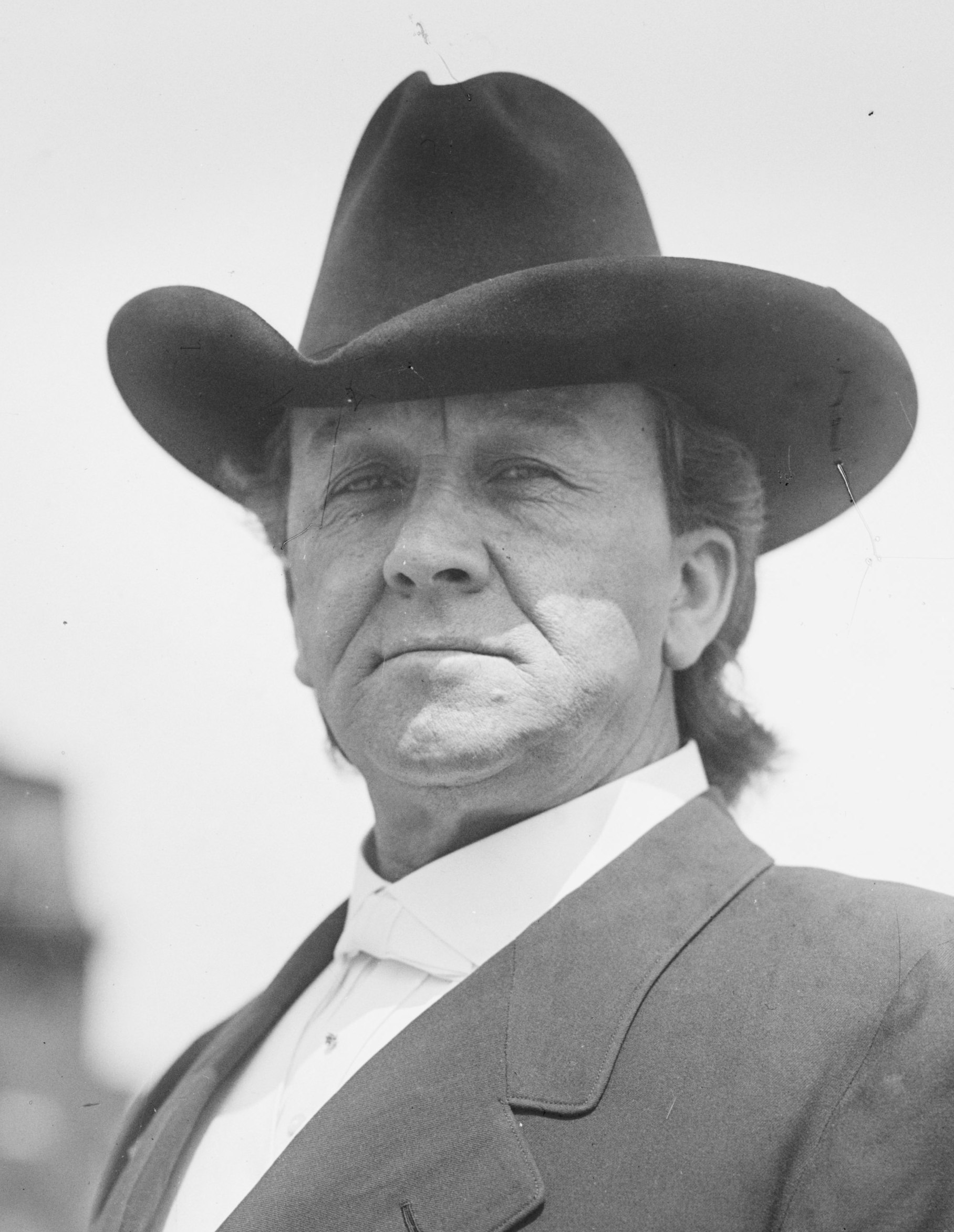

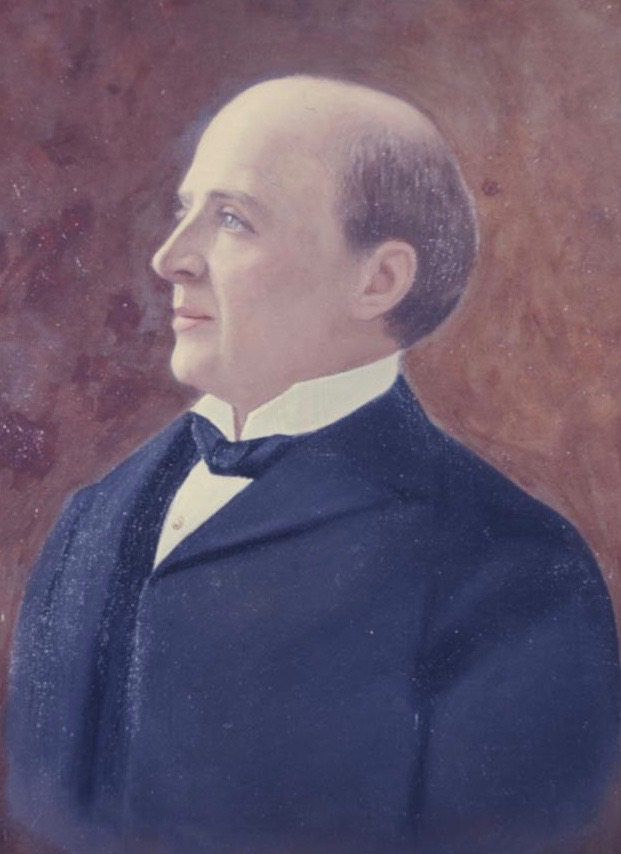
Nominee	Pat Harrison	James K. Vardaman	Edmond Noel
Party	Democratic	Democratic	Democratic
Popular vote	56,715	44,154	6,730
Percentage	52.71%	41.04%	6.26%
- County results Harrison: 40–50% 50–60% 60–70% 70–80% 80–90% Vardaman: 40–50% 50–60% 60–70% 70–80% Noel: 50–60%
U.S. senator before election
James K. Vardaman
Democratic
Elected U.S. Senator
Pat Harrison
Democratic

== Missouri (special) ==
1918 United States Senate special election in Missouri
- November 5, 1918
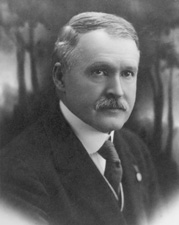

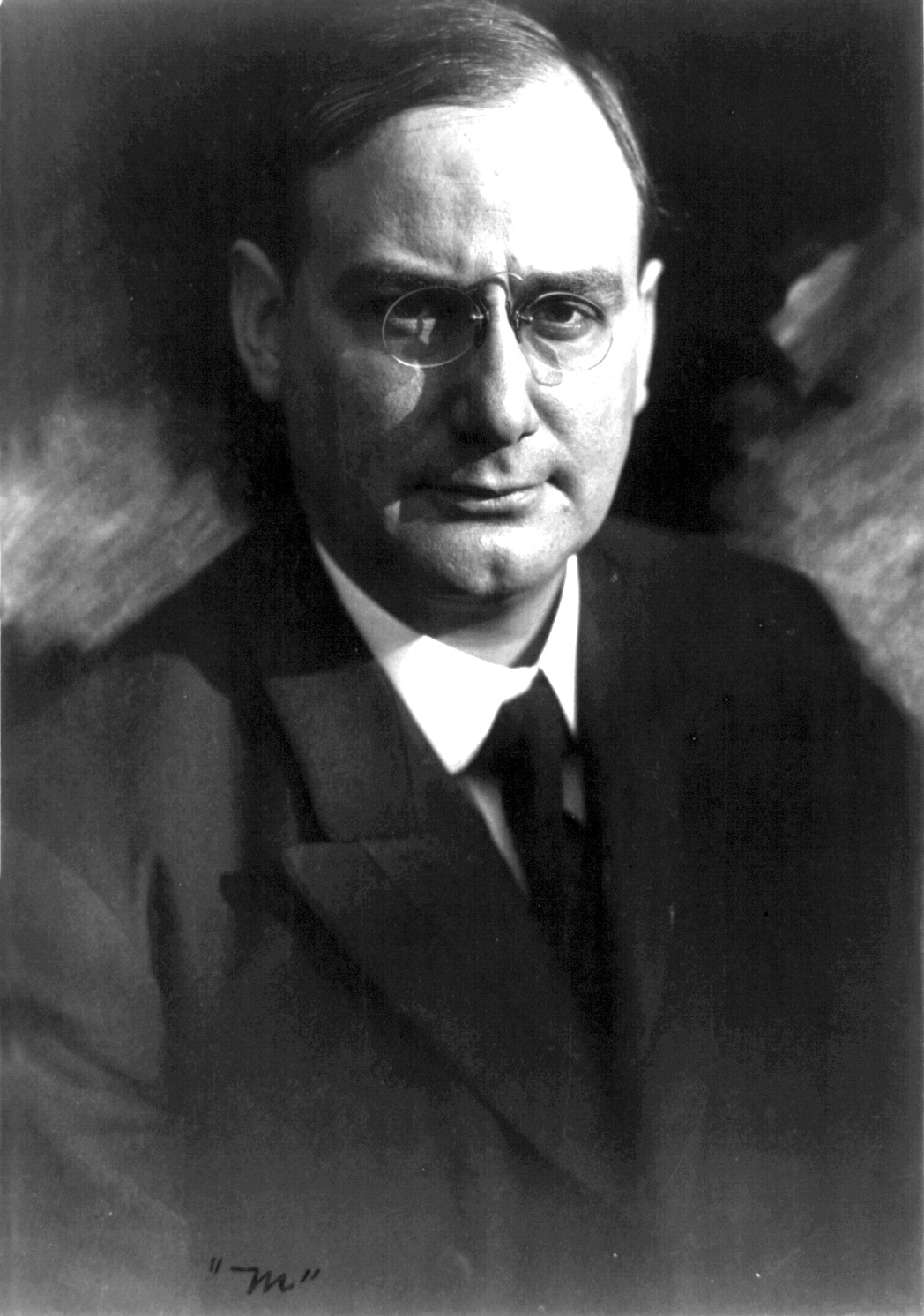
Nominee	Selden P. Spencer	Joseph W. Folk
Party	Republican	Democratic
Popular vote	302,680	267,397
Percentage	52.39%	46.29%
- County results Spencer: 40–50% 50–60% 60–70% 70–80% 80–90% Folk: 40–50% 50–60% 60–70% 70–80% 80–90%
U.S. senator before election
Xenophon P. Wilfley
Democratic
Elected U.S. senator
Selden P. Spencer
Republican

== Montana ==
1918 United States Senate election in Montana
- November 5, 1918
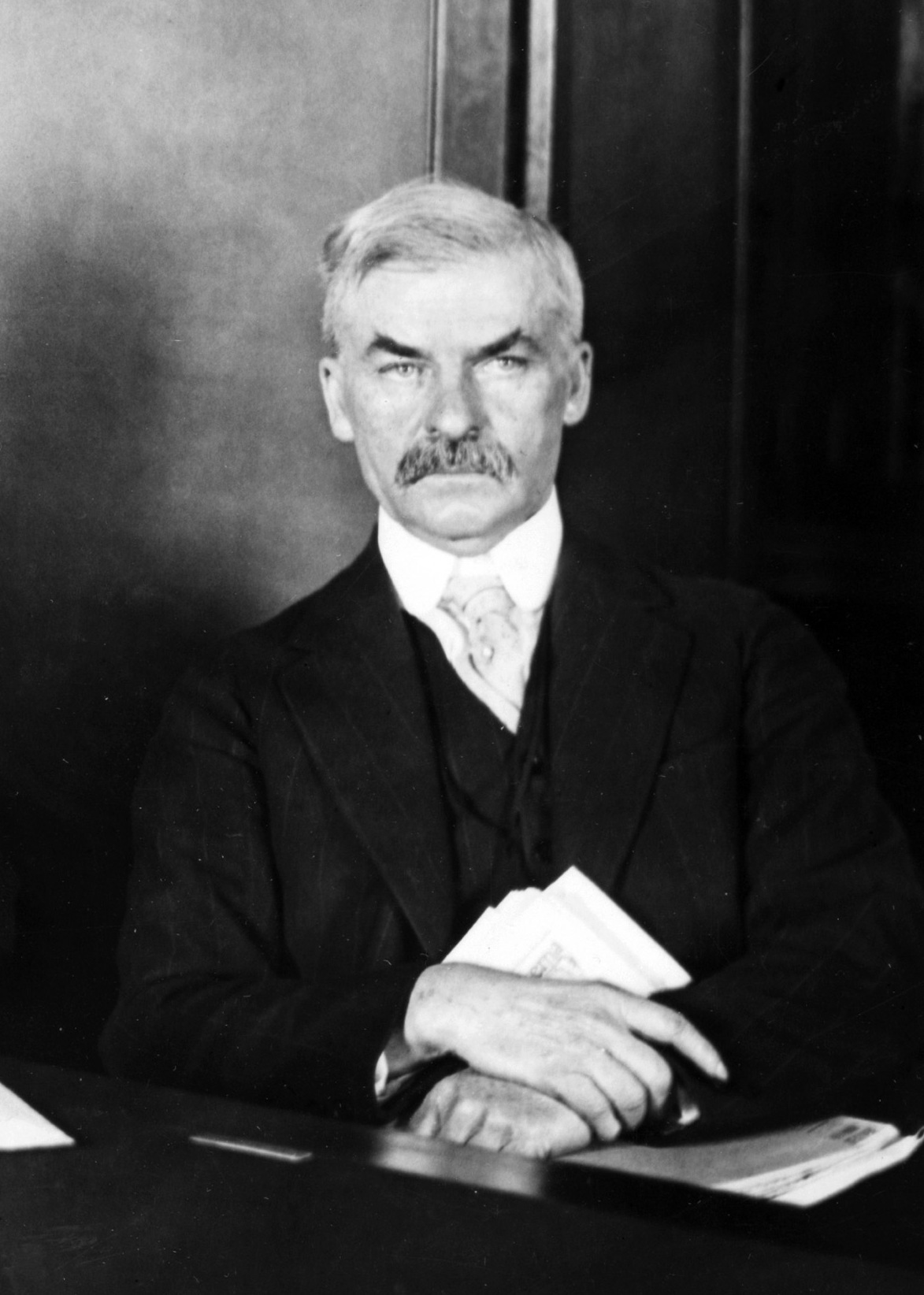

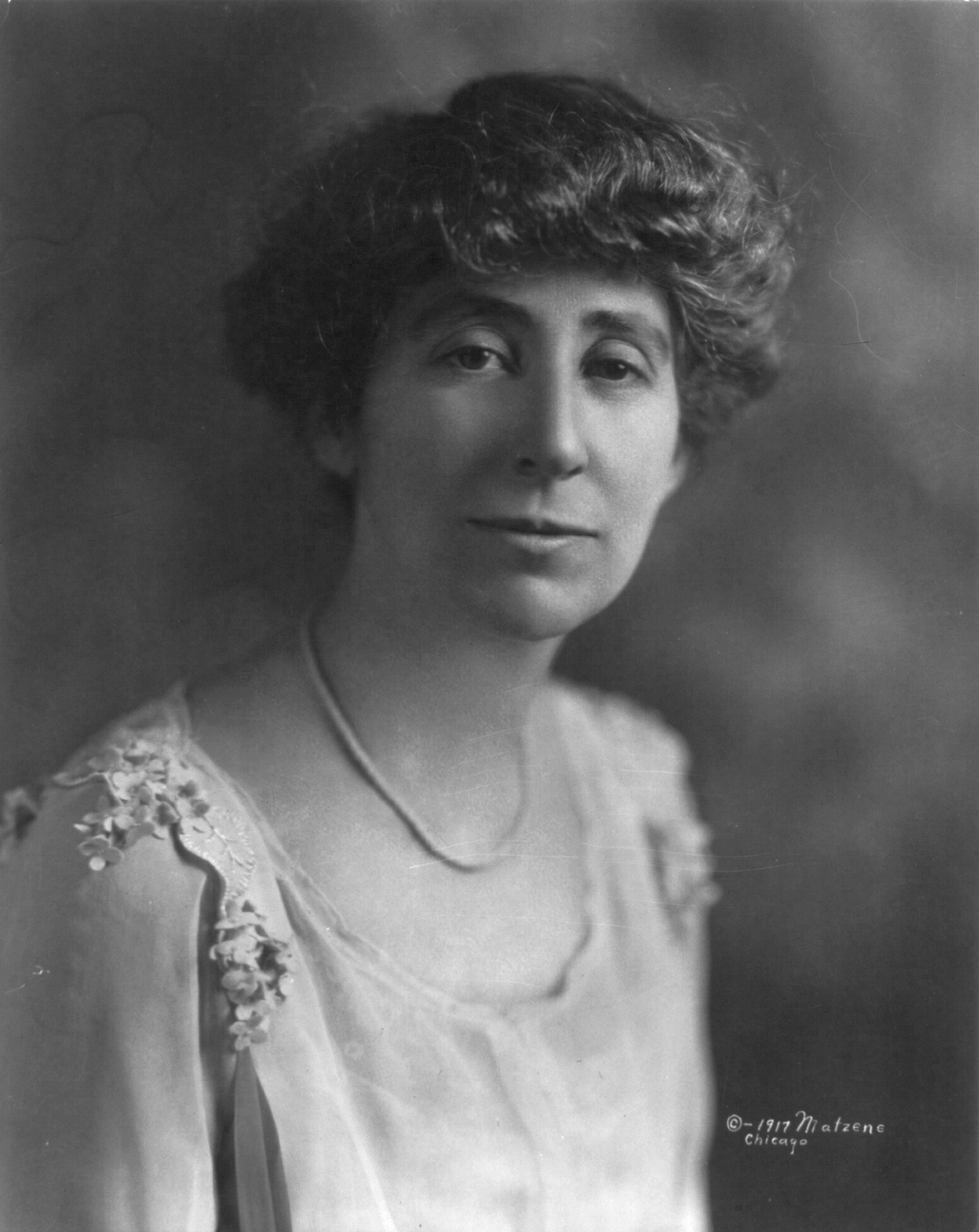
Nominee	Thomas J. Walsh	Oscar M. Lanstrum	Jeannette Rankin
Party	Democratic	Republican	National
Popular vote	46,160	40,229	26,013
Percentage	41.07%	35.79%	23.14%
- County results Walsh: 30–40% 40–50% 50–60% Lanstrum: 30–40% 40–50% 50–60% Rankin: 30–40% 40–50% No Data/Vote
U.S. senator before election
Thomas J. Walsh
Democratic
Elected U.S. Senator
Thomas J. Walsh
Democratic

== Nebraska ==
1918 United States Senate election in Nebraska
- November 5, 1918
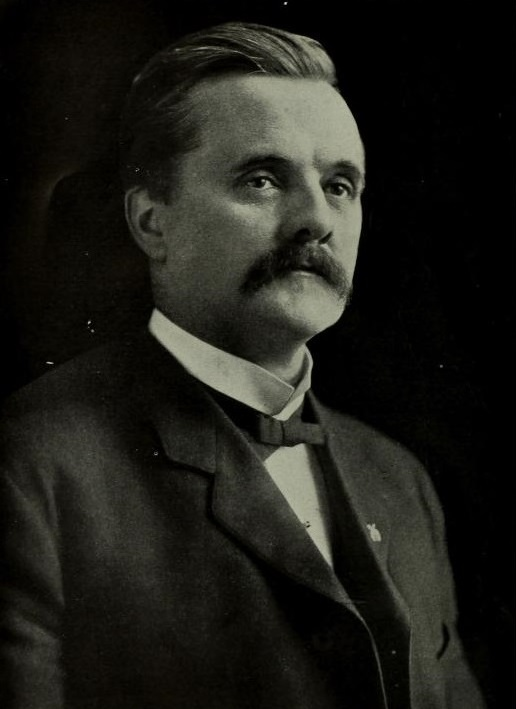

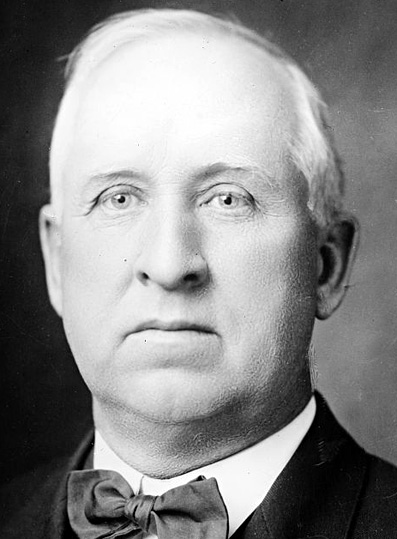
Nominee	George W. Norris	John H. Morehead
Party	Republican	Democratic
Popular vote	119,486	99,696
Percentage	54.51%	45.49%
- County results Norris: 50–60% 60–70% Morehead: 50–60% 60–70%
U.S. senator before election
George W. Norris
Republican
Elected U.S. senator
George W. Norris
Republican

== Nevada (special) ==
1918 United States Senate special election in Nevada
- November 5, 1918
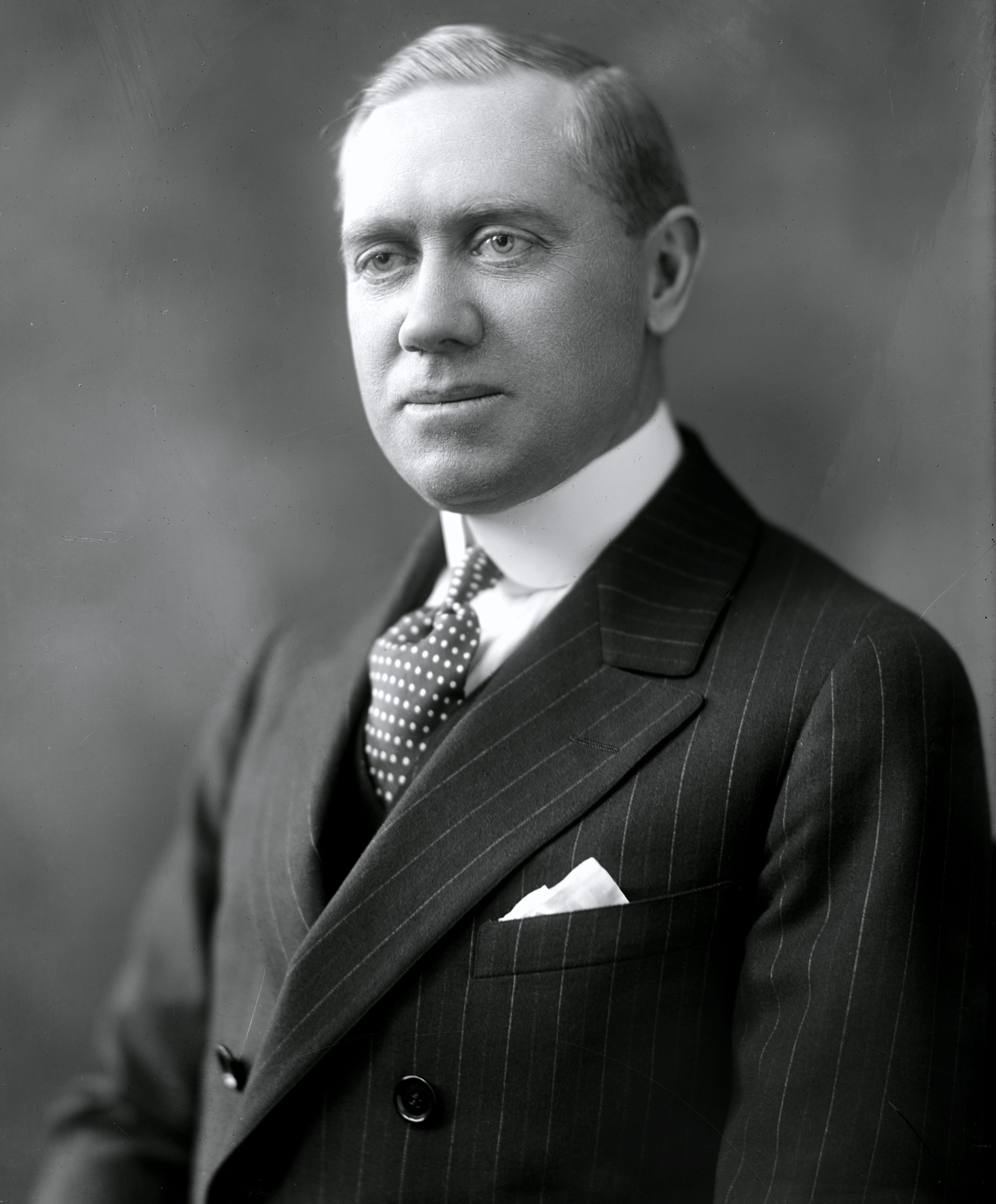

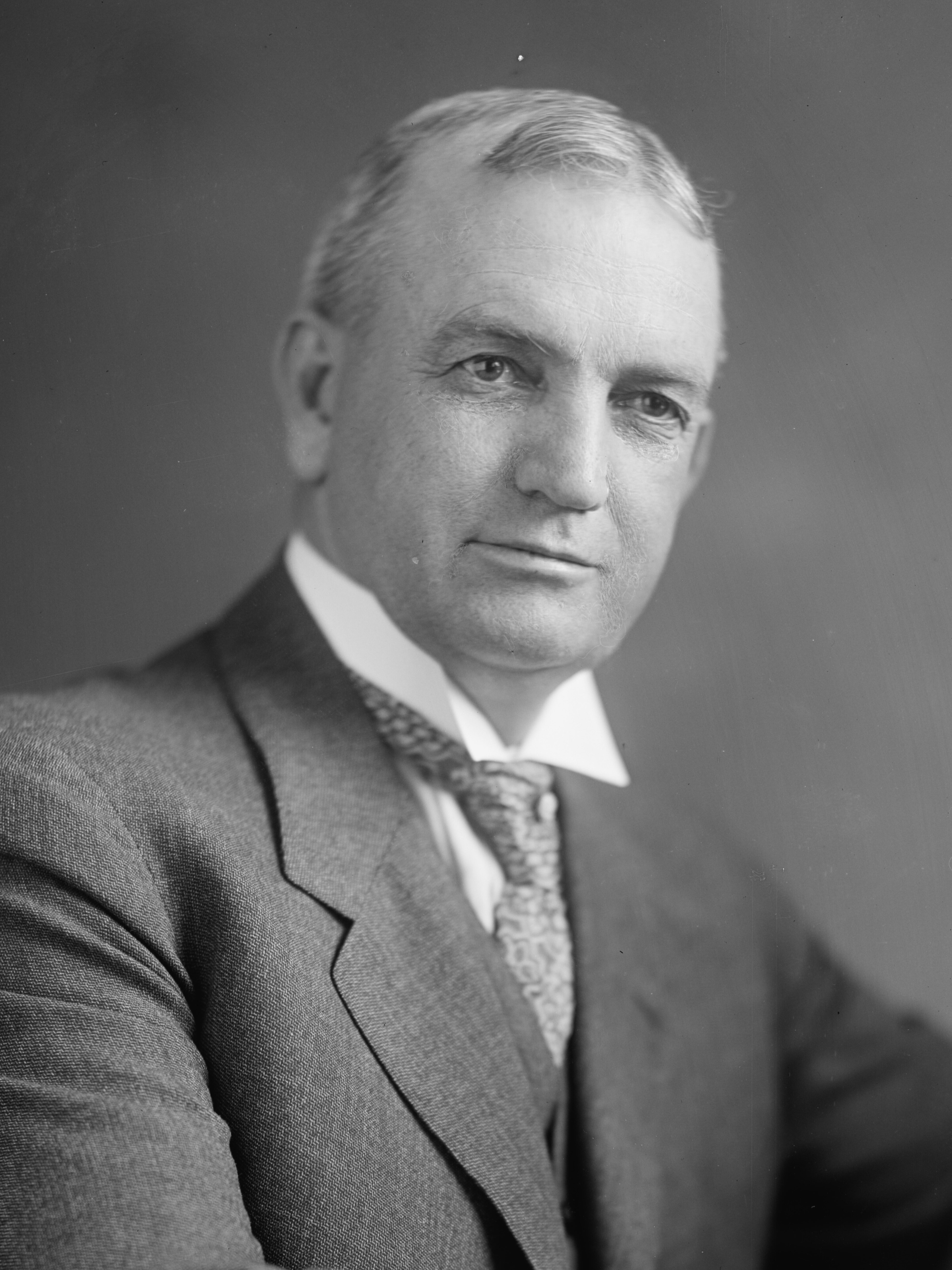

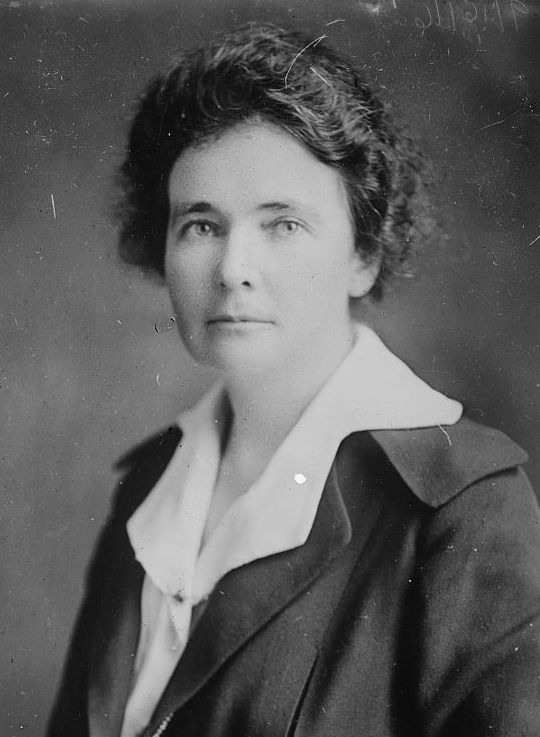
Nominee	Charles Henderson	Edwin E. Roberts	Anne Henrietta Martin
Party	Democratic	Republican	Independent
Popular vote	12,197	8,053	4,603
Percentage	47.71%	31.50%	18.01%
- Results by county Henderson: 30–40% 40–50% 50–60% 60–70% Roberts: 40–50% 50–60%
U.S. senator before election
Charles Henderson
Democratic
Elected U.S. senator
Charles Henderson
Democratic

== New Hampshire ==
=== New Hampshire (regular) ===
1918 United States Senate election in New Hampshire
- November 5, 1918
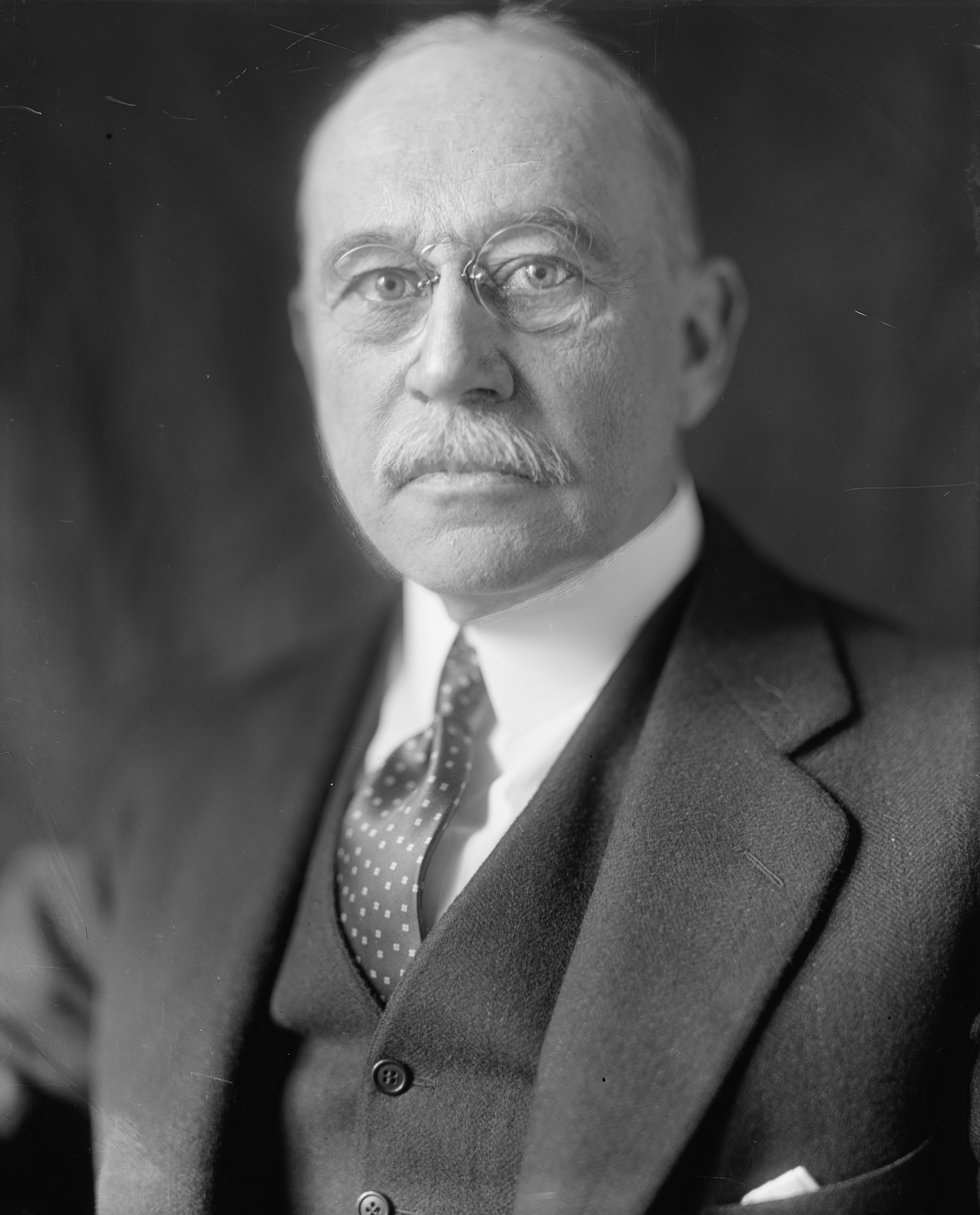

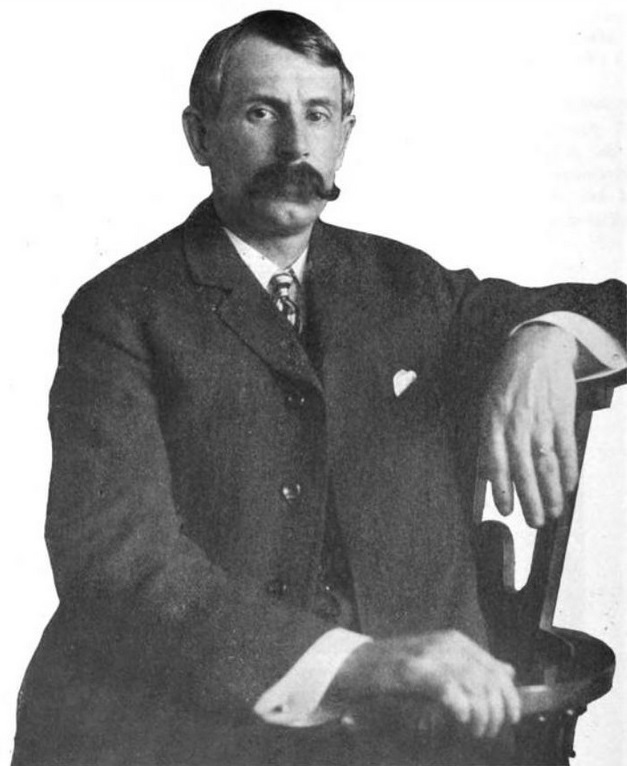
Nominee	Henry W. Keyes	Eugene Elliott Reed
Party	Republican	Democratic
Popular vote	37,783	32,783
Percentage	53.54%	46.46%
- Keyes: 50–60% 60–70% 70–80% 80–90% >90% Reed: 50–60% 60–70% 70–80% Tie: 50%
U.S. senator before election
Henry F. Hollis
Republican
Elected U.S. senator
Henry W. Keyes
Republican

=== New Hampshire (special) ===
1918 United States Senate special election in New Hampshire
- November 5, 1918
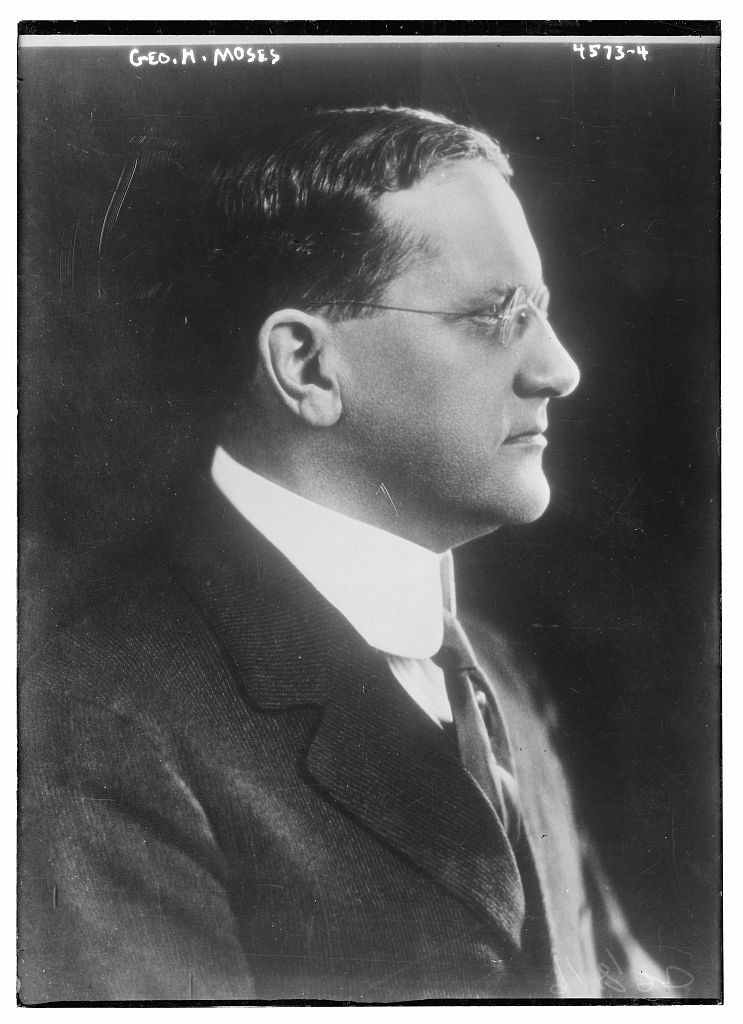

Nominee	George H. Moses	John B. Jameson
Party	Republican	Democratic
Popular vote	35,528	34,458
Percentage	50.76%	49.24%
- Moses: 50–60% 60–70% 70–80% 80–90% >90% Jameson: 50–60% 60–70% 70–80% Tied: 50%
U.S. senator before election
Irving W. Drew
Republican
Elected U.S. senator
George H. Moses
Republican

== New Jersey ==
=== New Jersey (regular) ===
1918 United States Senate election in New Jersey
- November 5, 1918
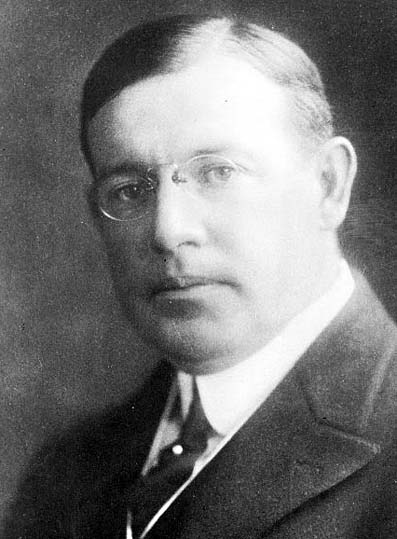

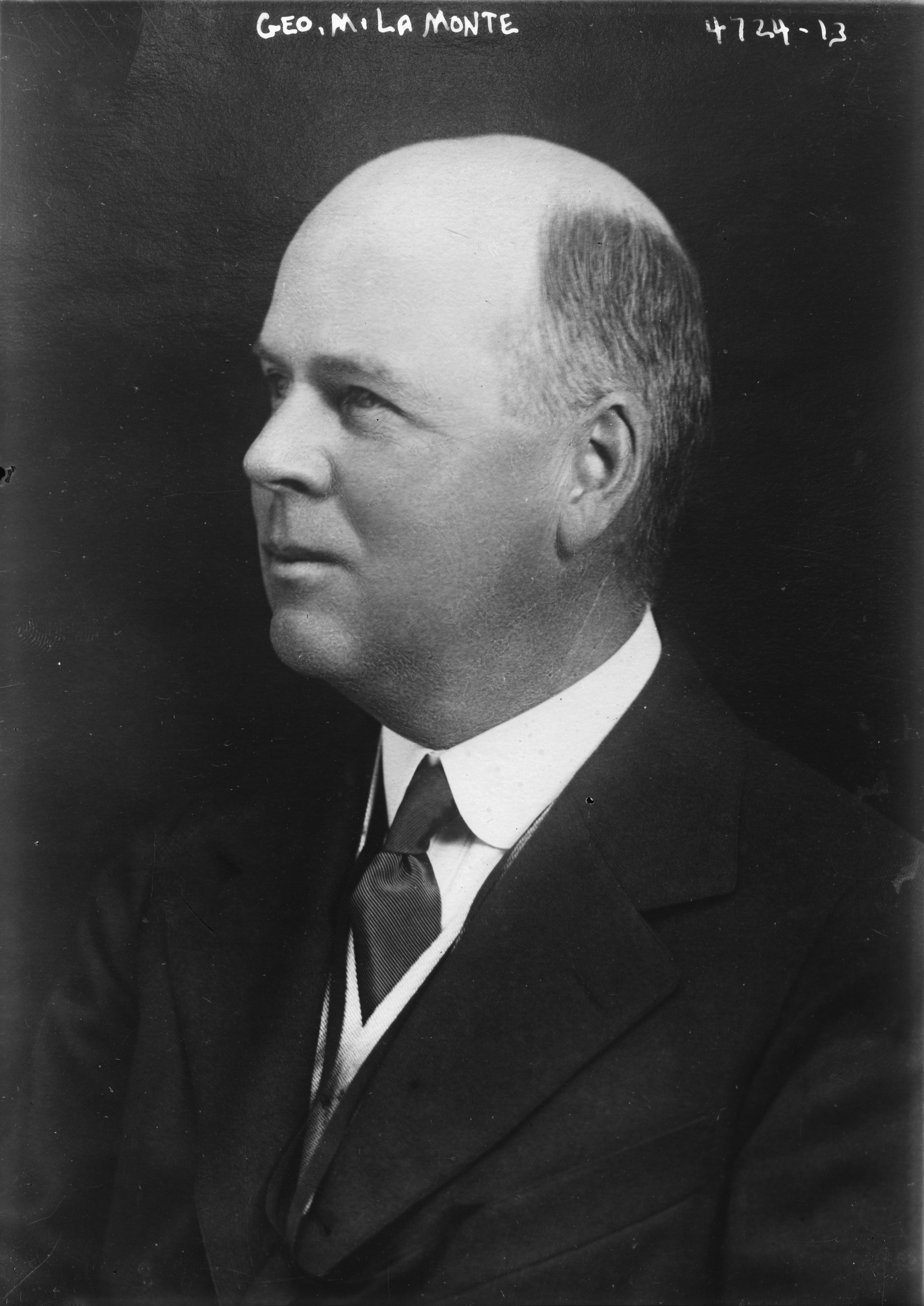
Nominee	Walter E. Edge	George M. La Monte
Party	Republican	Democratic
Popular vote	179,022	153,743
Percentage	50.34%	43.23%
- Results by county Edge: 40–50% 50–60% 60–70% 70–80% Monte: 40–50% 50–60% 60–70%
Senator before election
David Baird Sr.
Republican
Elected Senator
Walter E. Edge
Republican

=== New Jersey (special) ===
1918 United States Senate special election in New Jersey
- November 7, 1918
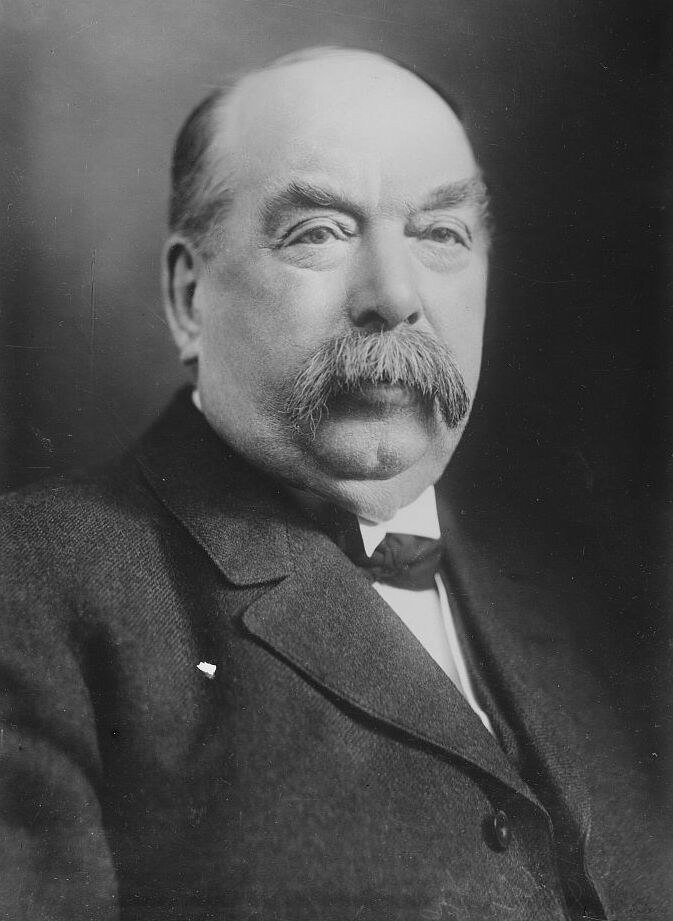

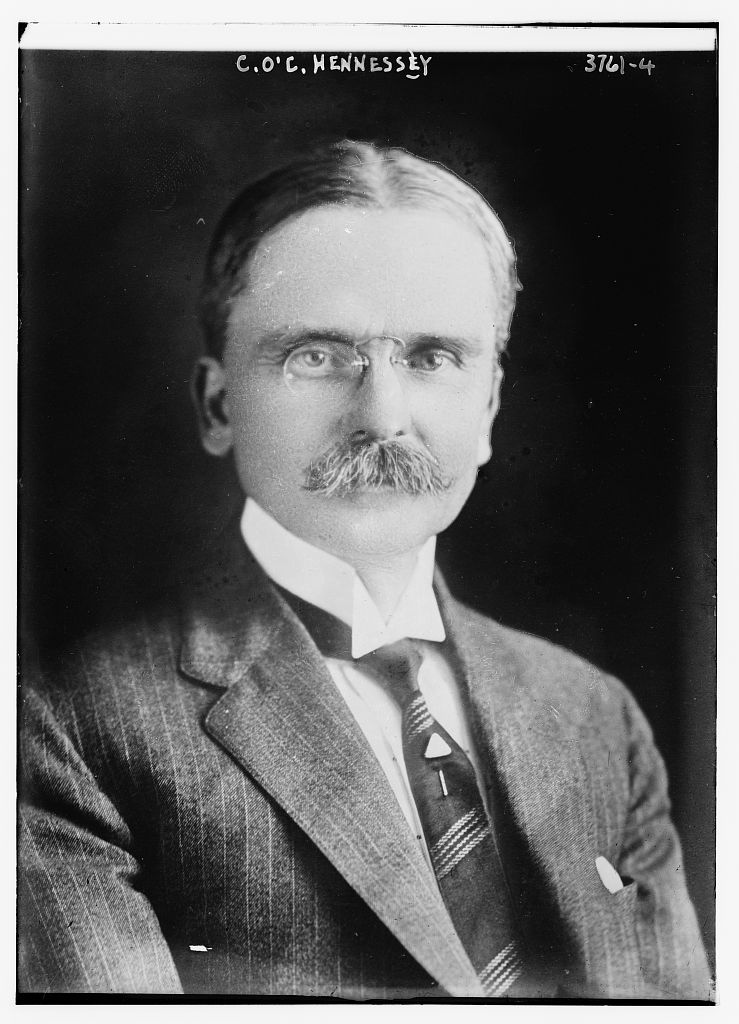
Nominee	David Baird Sr.	Charles O'Connor Hennessy
Party	Republican	Democratic
Popular vote	170,414	154,734
Percentage	49.17%	44.64%
- Results by county Baird: 40–50% 50–60% 60–70% 70–80% Hennessy: 40–50% 50–60% 60–70%
U.S. senator before election
David Baird Sr.
Republican
Elected U.S. senator
David Baird Sr.
Republican

== New Mexico ==
1918 United States Senate election in New Mexico
- November 5, 1918
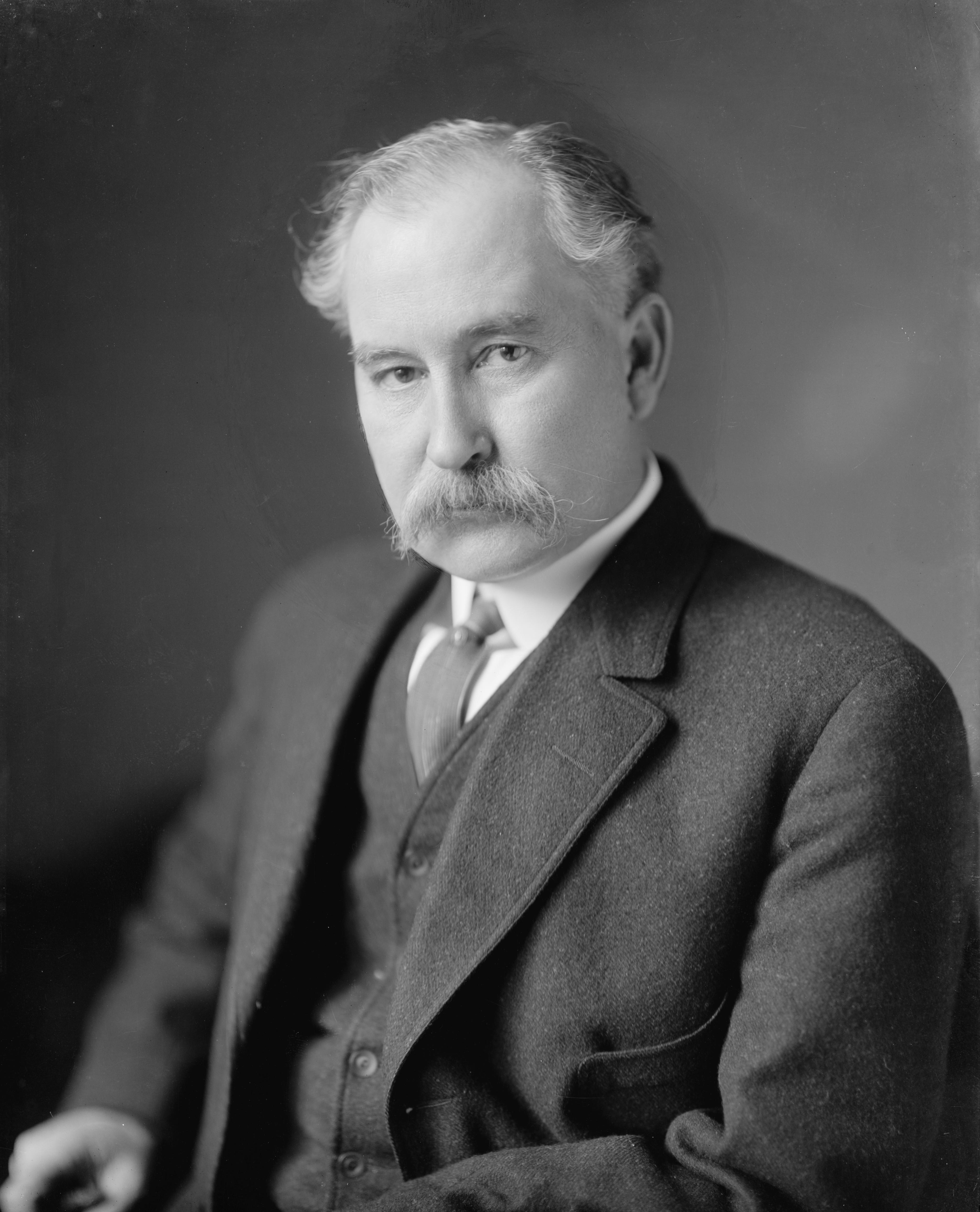

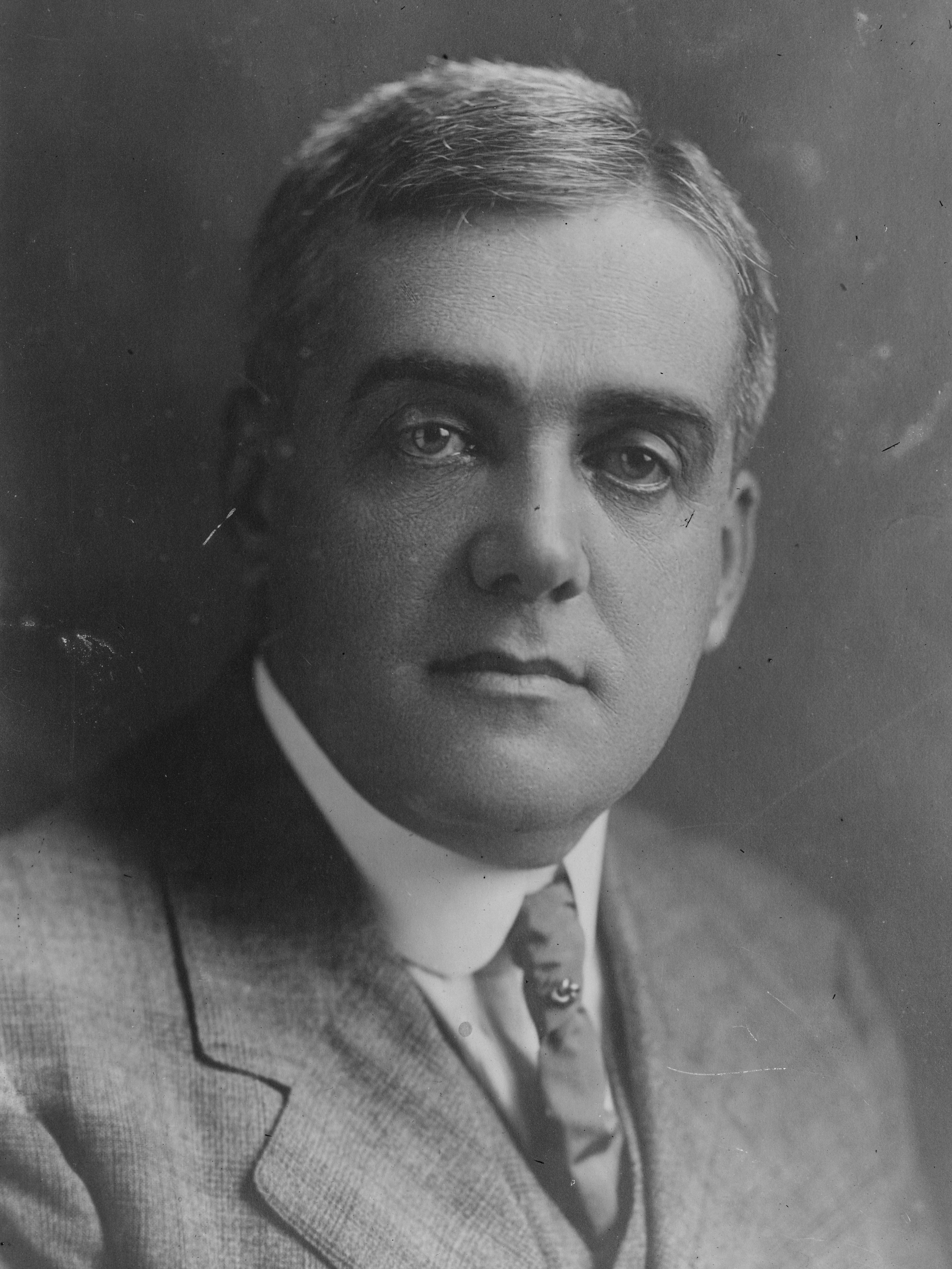
Nominee	Albert B. Fall	William B. Walton
Party	Republican	Democratic
Popular vote	24,322	22,470
Percentage	51.40%	47.48%
- Results by county Fall: 50–60% 60–70% 80–90% Walton: 50–60% 60–70% 70–80% 80–90% 90–100%
U.S. senator before election
Albert B. Fall
Republican
Elected U.S. senator
Albert B. Fall
Republican

== North Carolina ==
1918 United States Senate election in North Carolina
- November 5, 1918
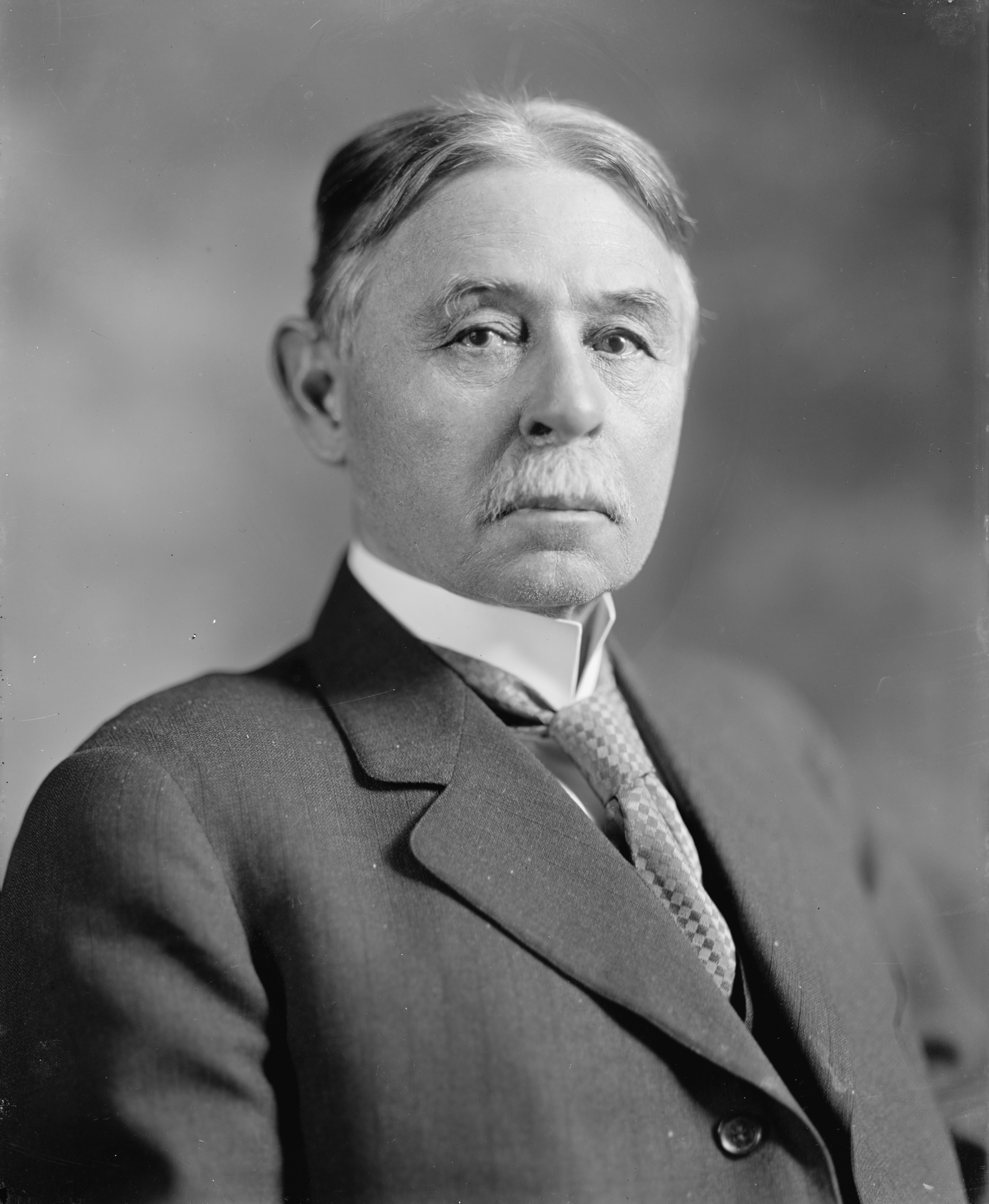

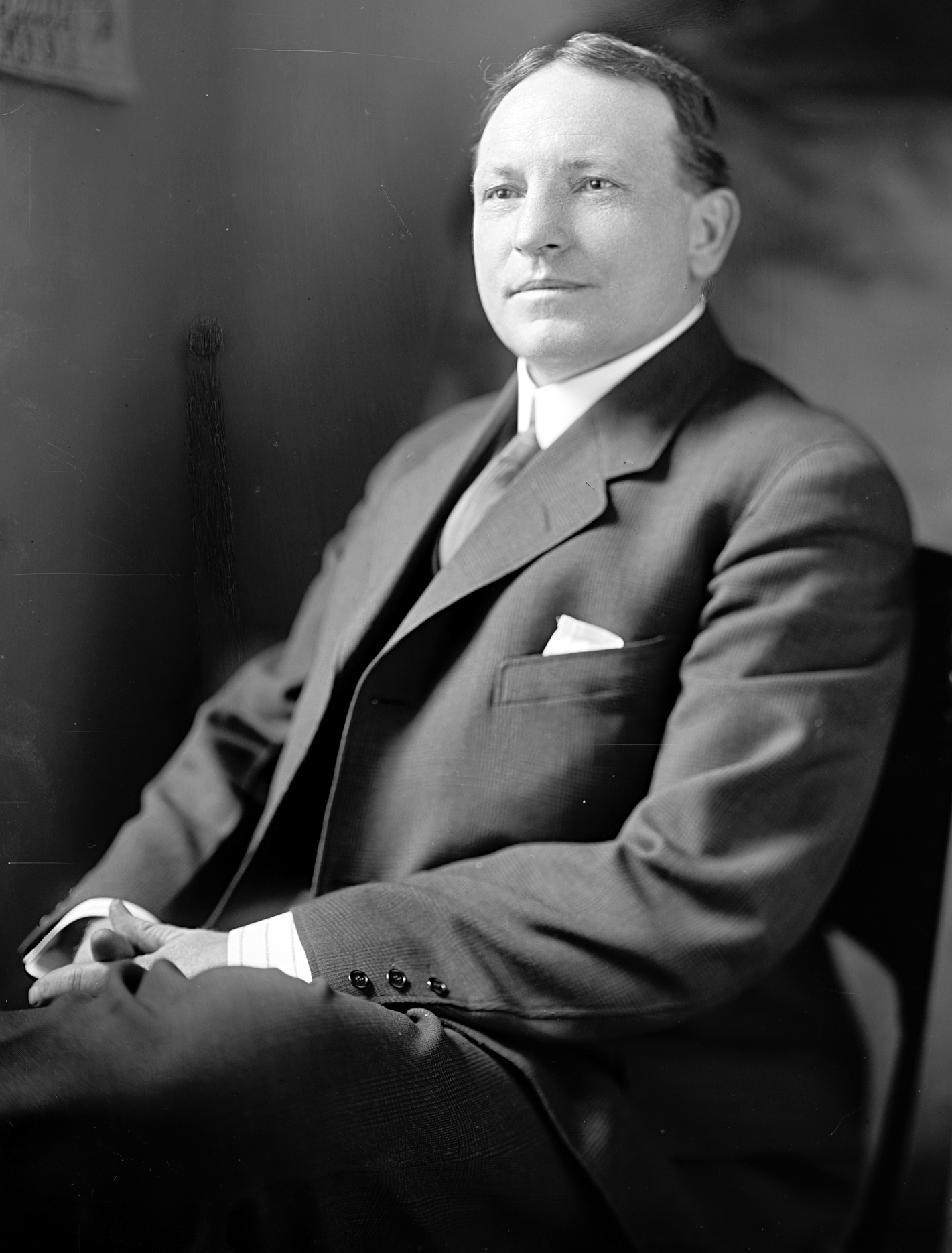
Nominee	F. M. Simmons	John Motley Morehead II
Party	Democratic	Republican
Popular vote	143,519	93,707
Percentage	60.50%	39.50%
- Results by county Simmons: 50–60% 60–70% 70–80% 80–90% 90–100% Morehead II: 50–60% 60–70% 70–80%
U.S. senator before election
F. M. Simmons
Democratic
Elected U.S. senator
F. M. Simmons
Democratic

== Oklahoma ==
1918 United States Senate election in Oklahoma
- November 5, 1918
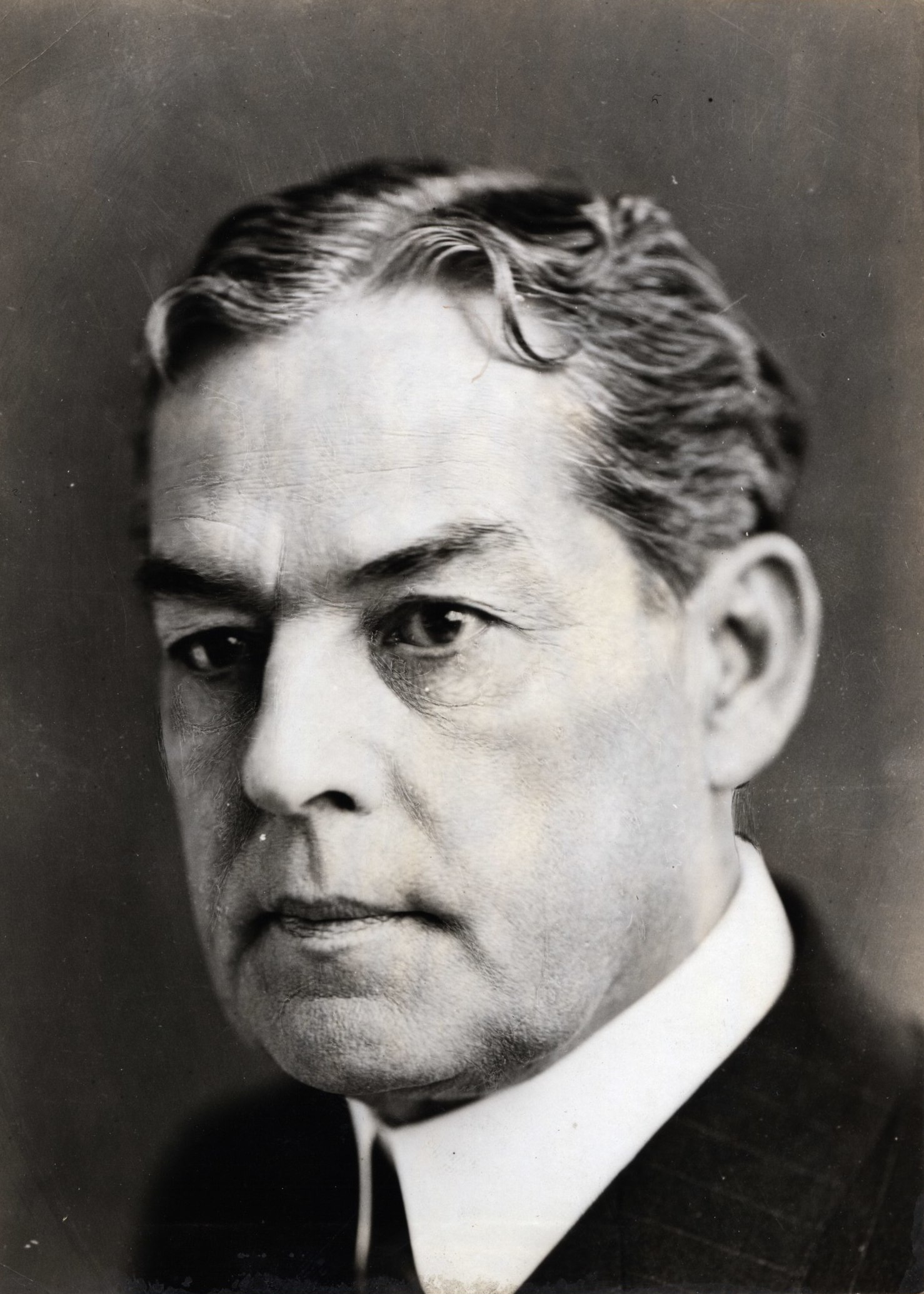
Nominee	Robert L. Owen	W. B. Johnson
Party	Democratic	Republican
Popular vote	105,009	77,043
Percentage	55.47%	40.69%
- County results Owen: 40–50% 50–60% 60–70% 70–80% 80–90% Johnson: 40–50% 50–60%
U.S. senator before election
Robert L. Owen
Democratic
Elected U.S. Senator
Robert L. Owen
Democratic

== Oregon ==
=== Oregon (regular) ===
1918 United States Senate election in Oregon
- November 5, 1918
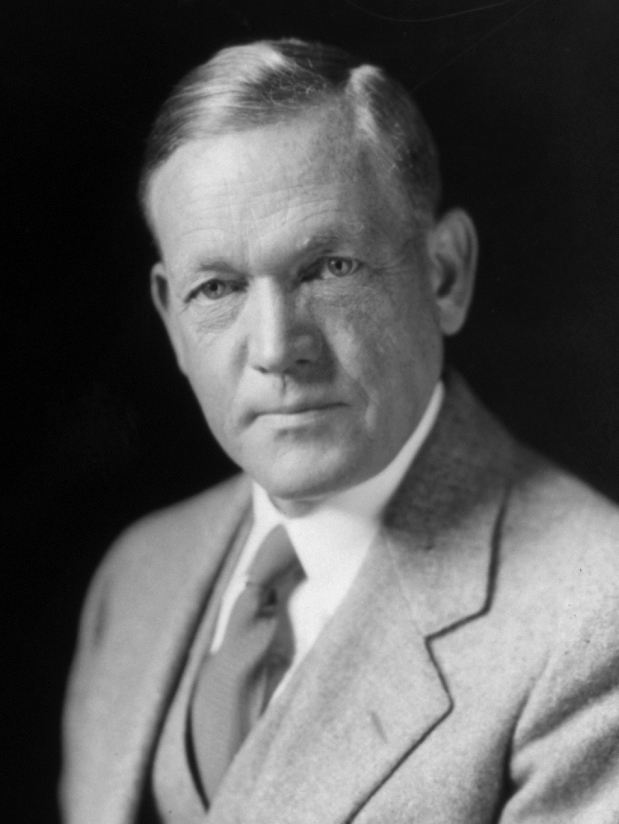

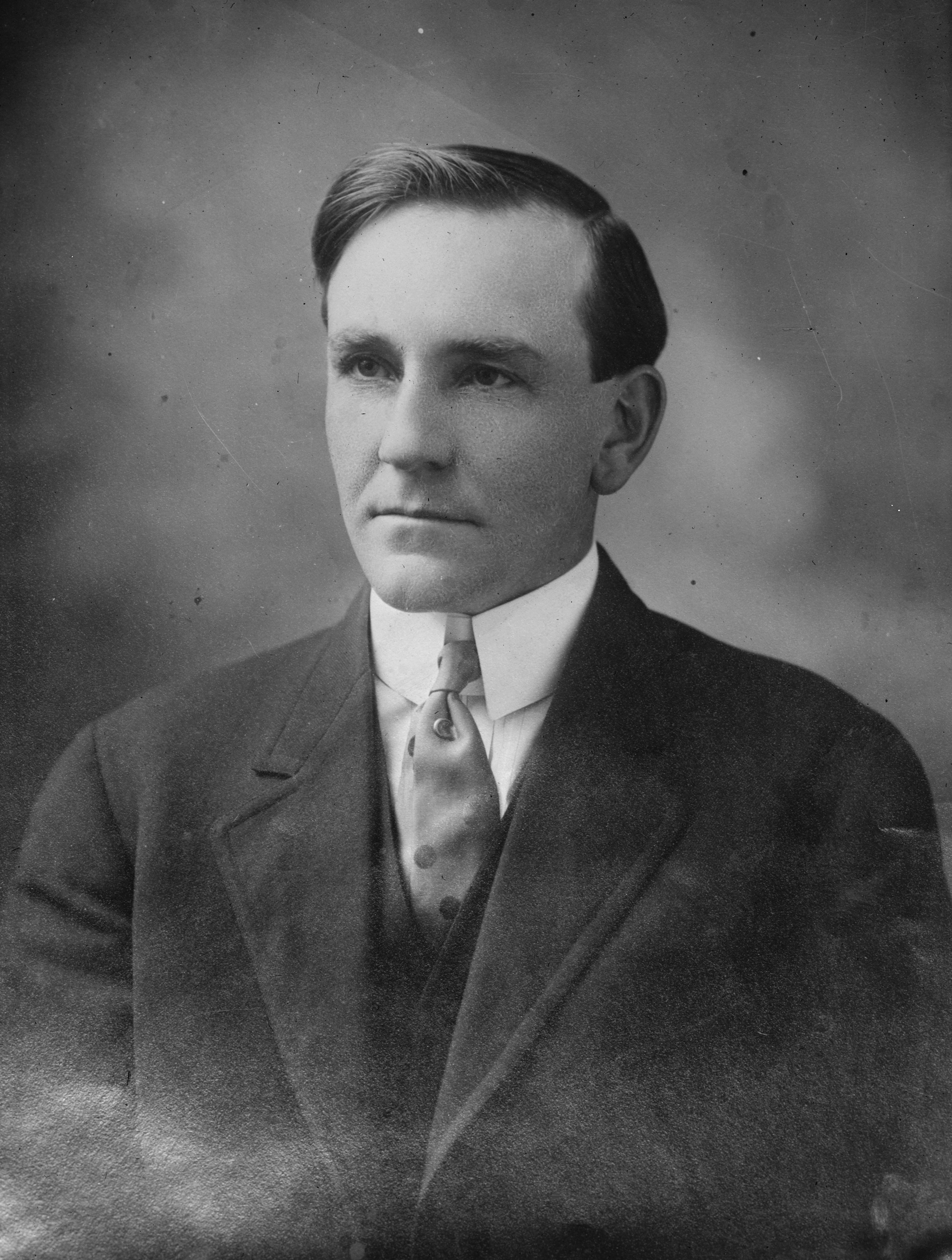
Nominee	Charles L. McNary	Oswald West
Party	Republican	Democratic
Popular vote	82,360	64,303
Percentage	54.17%	42.30%
- Results by county McNary: 40–50% 50–60% 60–70% West: 40–50% 50–60%
U.S. senator before election
Frederick W. Mulkey
Republican
Elected U.S. senator
Charles L. McNary
Republican

=== Oregon (special) ===
1918 United States Senate special election in Oregon
- November 5, 1918
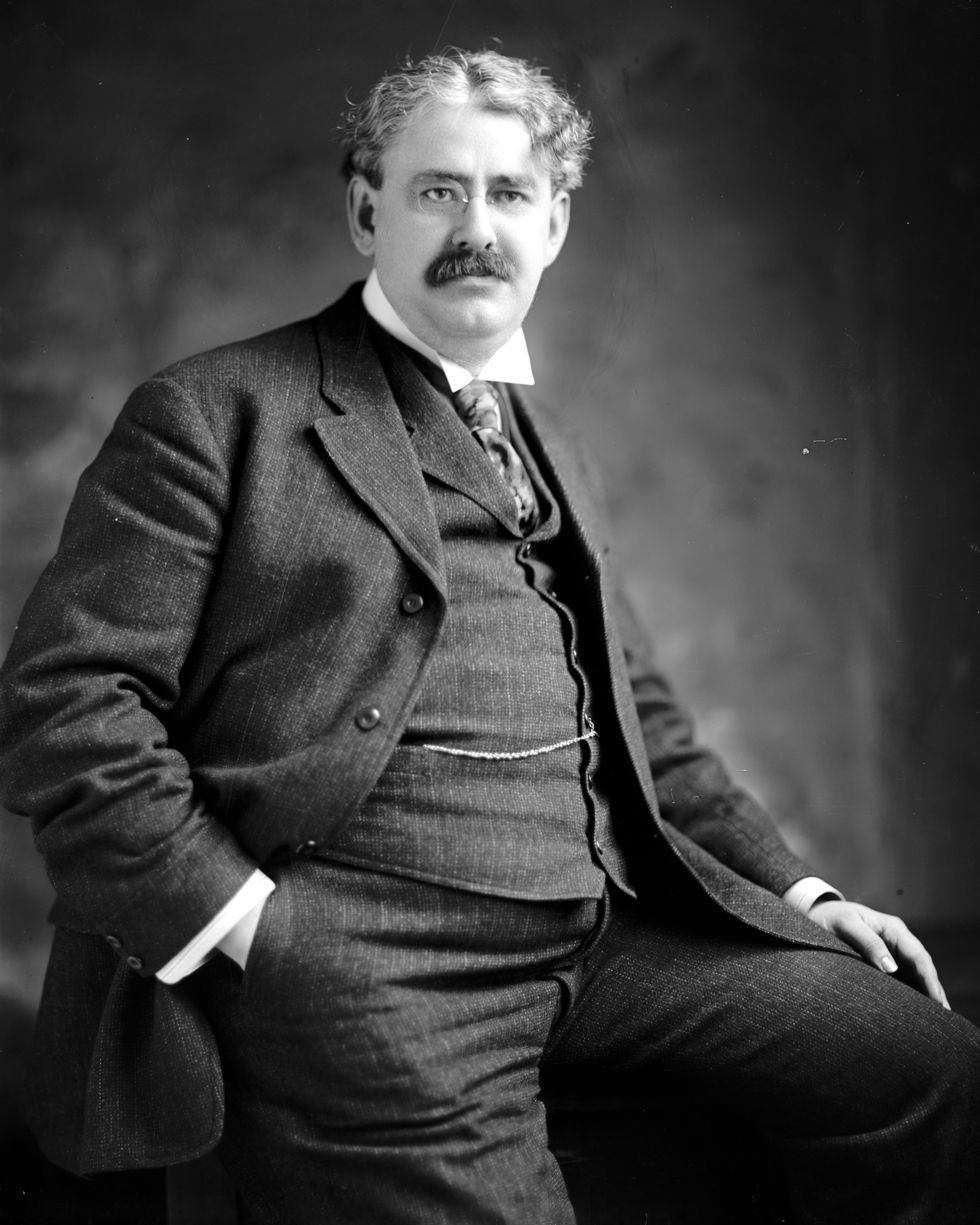

Nominee	Frederick W. Mulkey	Martha Bean
Party	Republican	Socialist
Popular vote	103,913	19,014
Percentage	84.53%	15.47%
- Results by county Mulkey: 70–80% 80–90% 90–100%
U.S. senator before election
Charles L. McNary
Republican
Elected U.S. senator
Frederick W. Mulkey
Republican

== Rhode Island ==
1918 United States Senate election in Rhode Island
- November 5, 1918
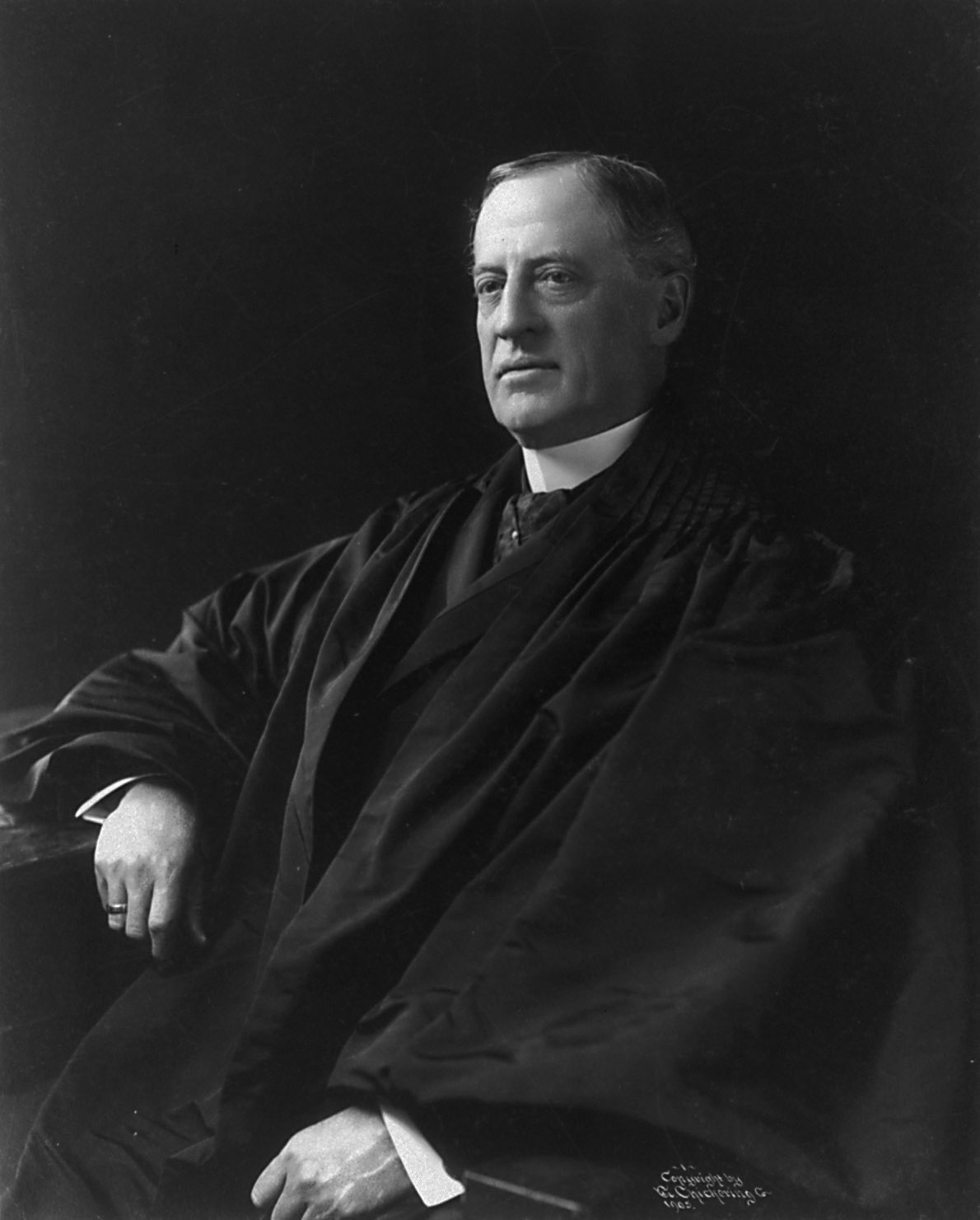

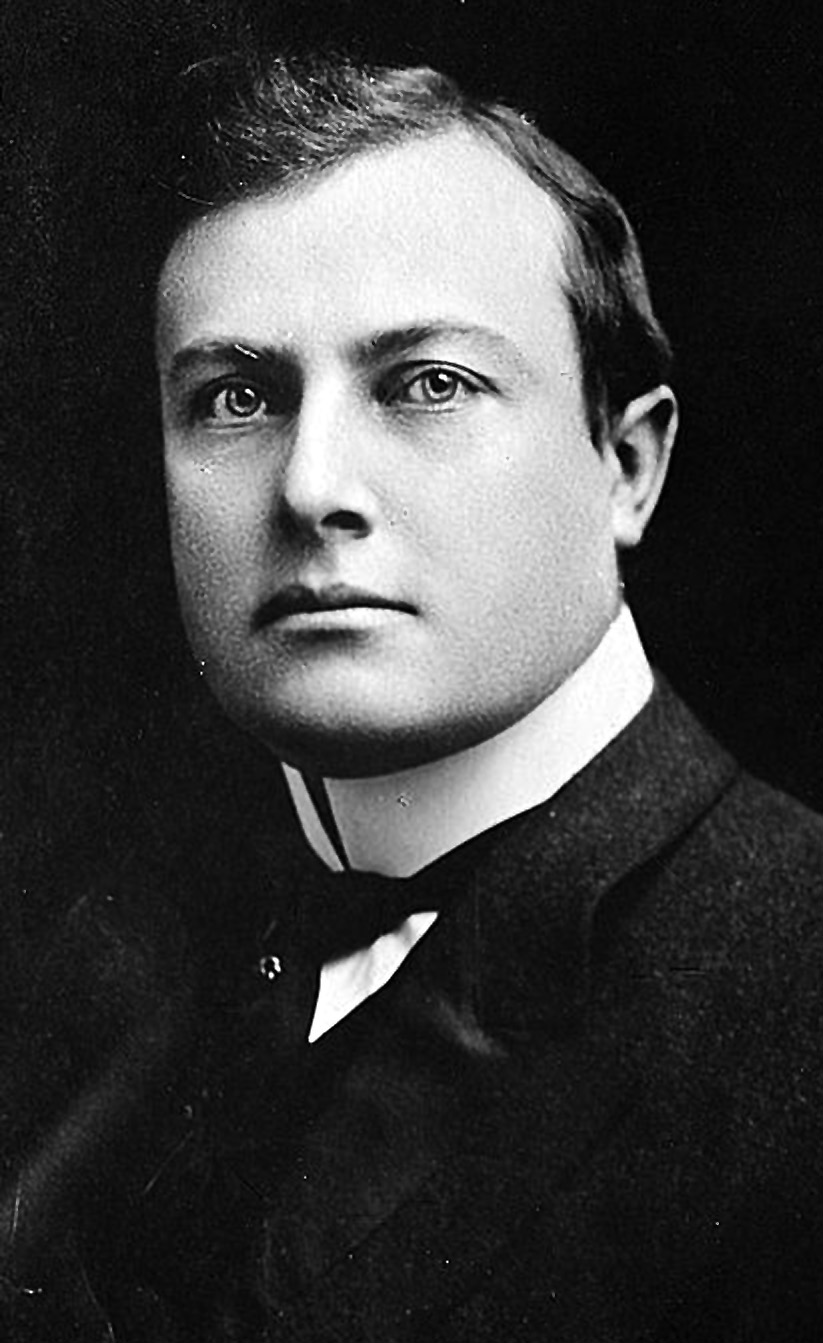
Nominee	LeBaron B. Colt	George F. O'Shaunessy
Party	Republican	Democratic
Popular vote	42,055	37,573
Percentage	51.76%	46.24%
U.S. senator before election
LeBaron B. Colt
Republican
Elected U.S. senator
LeBaron B. Colt
Republican

== South Carolina ==
=== South Carolina (regular) ===
1918 United States Senate election in South Carolina
- August 27, 1918
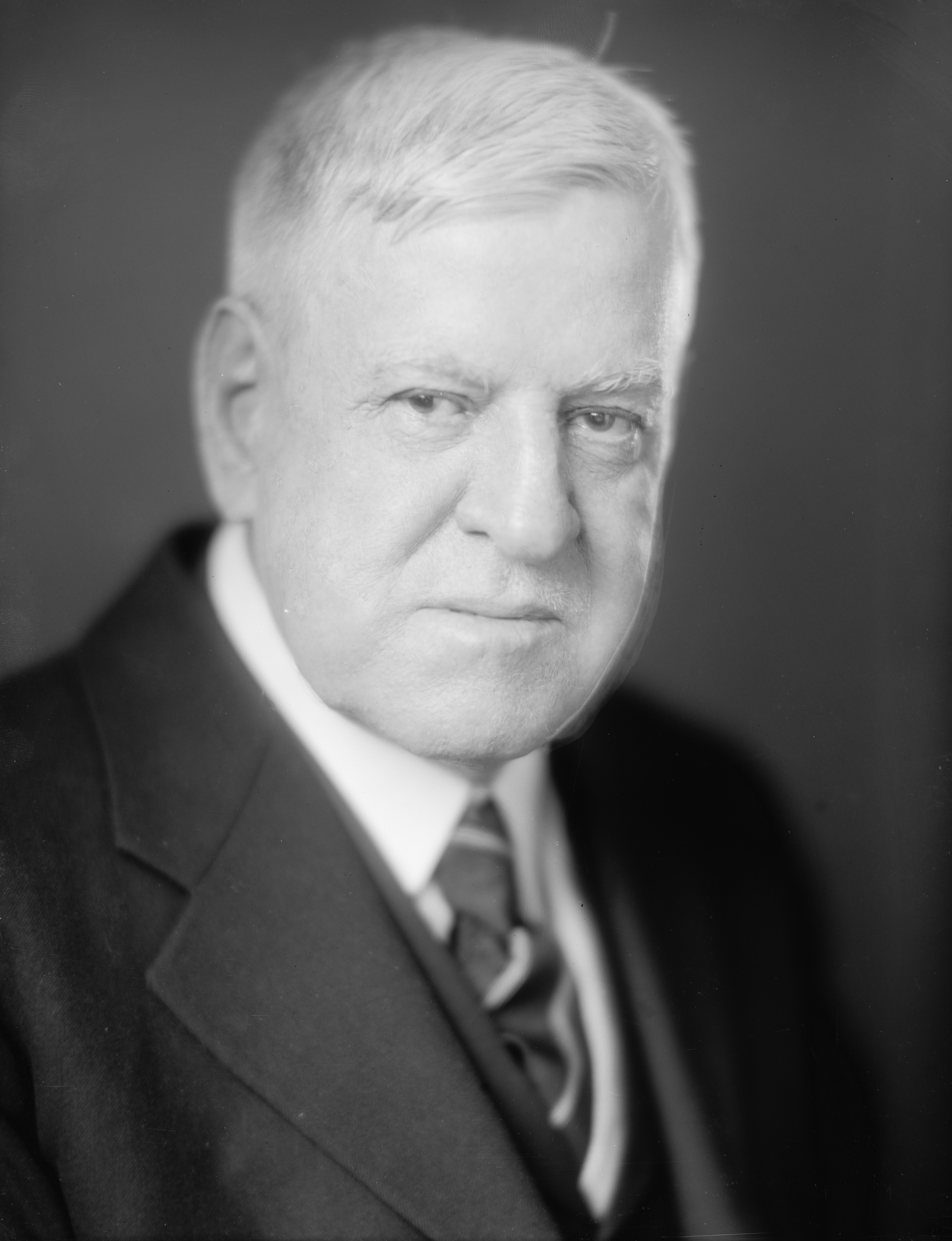

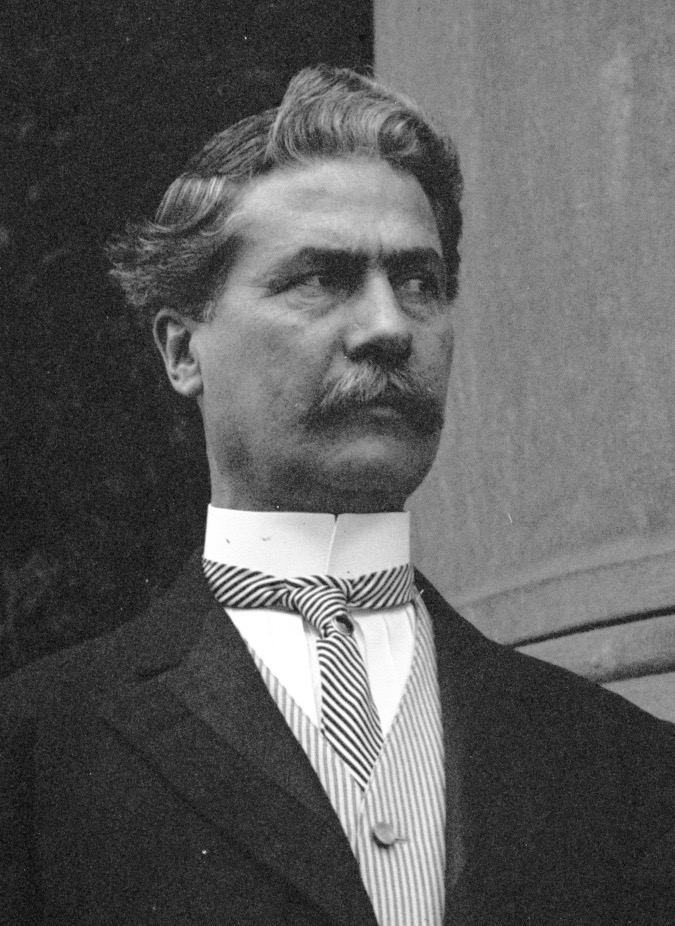
Candidate	Nathaniel B. Dial	Cole L. Blease
Party	Democratic	Democratic
Popular vote	65,064	40,456
Percentage	58.70%	36.50%
U.S. senator before election
William P. Pollock
Democratic
Elected U.S. senator
Nathaniel B. Dial
Democratic

South Carolina Democratic primary
Party	Candidate	Votes	%
Democratic	Nathaniel B. Dial	65,064	58.70
Democratic	Cole L. Blease	40,456	36.50
Democratic	James F. Rice	5,317	4.80
Majority		24,608	22.20
Total votes		110,837	100.00
Democratic hold			

=== South Carolina (special) ===
1918 United States Senate special election in South Carolina
- September 10, 1918
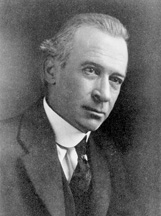

Nominee	William P. Pollock	Thomas H. Peeples
Party	Democratic	Democratic
Popular vote	49,920	30,044
Percentage	62.43%	37.57%
U.S. senator before election
Christie Benet
Democratic
Elected U.S. senator
William P. Pollock
Democratic

South Carolina special Democratic primary
Party	Candidate	Votes	%
Democratic	William P. Pollock	38,816	34.91
Democratic	Thomas H. Peeples	37,567	33.79
Democratic	Christie Benet (incumbent)	34,807	31.30
Total votes		111,190	100.00

South Carolina special Democratic primary runoff
Party	Candidate	Votes	%
Democratic	William P. Pollock	49,920	62.43
Democratic	Thomas H. Peeples	30,044	37.57
Majority		19,876	24.86
Total votes		79,964	100.00
Democratic hold			

== South Dakota ==
1918 United States Senate election in South Dakota
- September 10, 1918
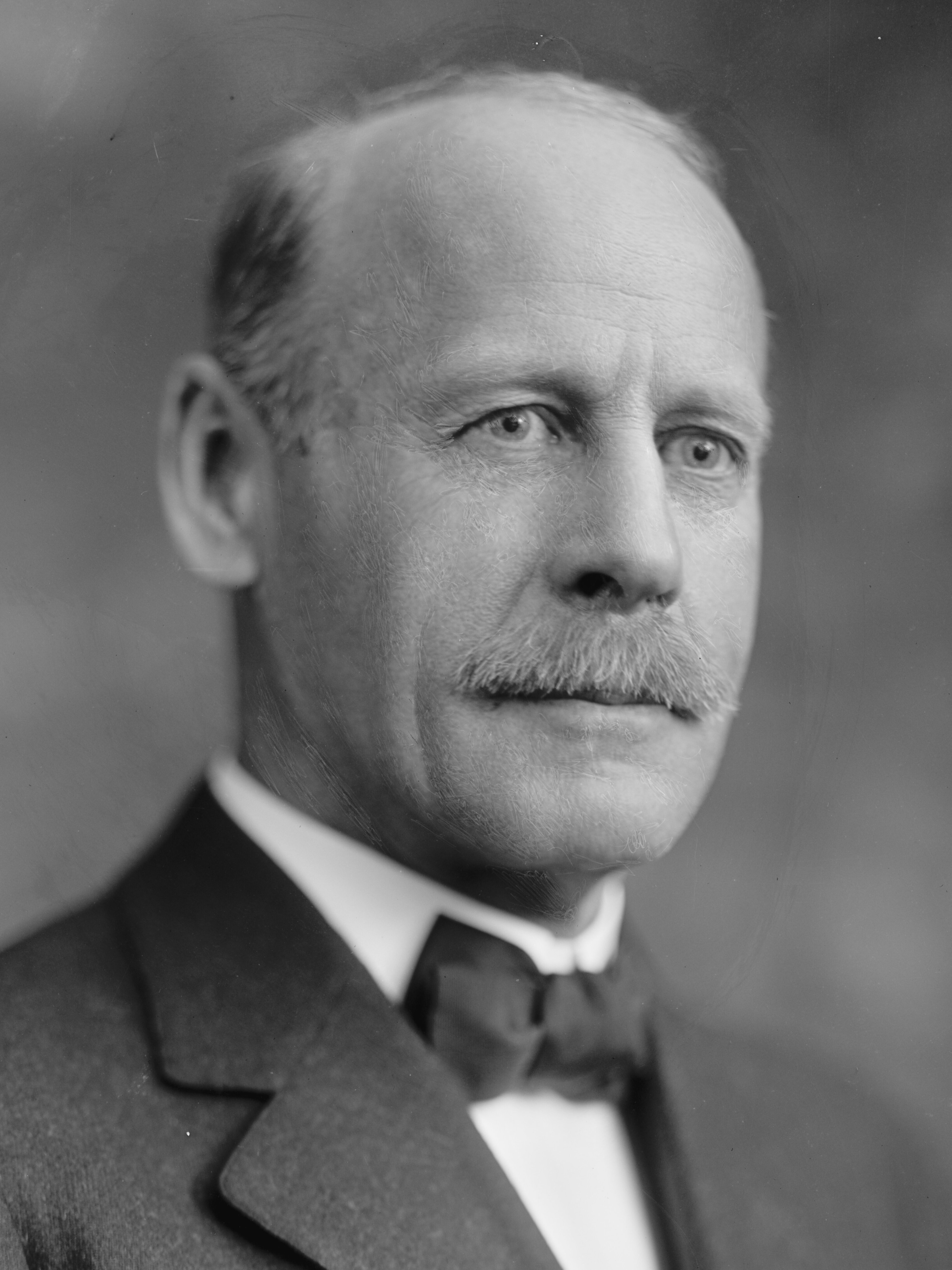

Nominee	Thomas Sterling	Orville V. Rinehart	W. T. Rafferty
Party	Republican	Democratic	Independent
Popular vote	51,198	36,210	5,560
Percentage	55.07%	38.95%	5.98%
- County results Sterling: 40–50% 50–60% 60–70% 70–80% Rinehart: 40–50% 50–60% 60–70% 70–80% No Vote
U.S. senator before election
Thomas Sterling
Republican
Elected U.S. Senator
Thomas Sterling
Republican

== Tennessee ==
1918 United States Senate election in Tennessee
- November 5, 1918
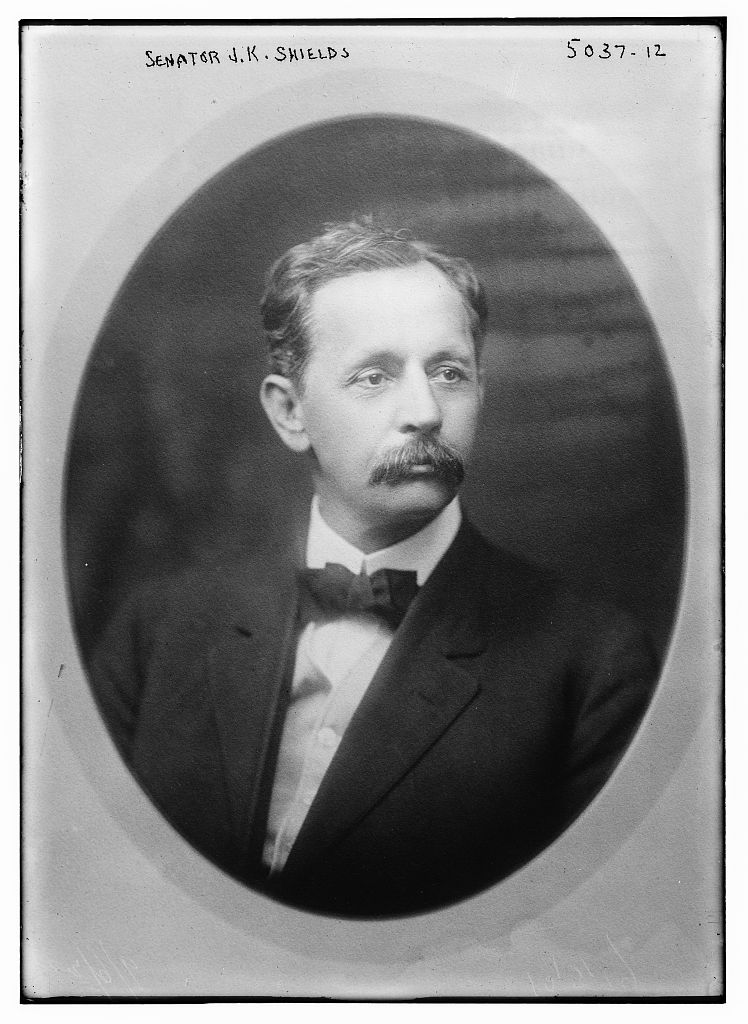

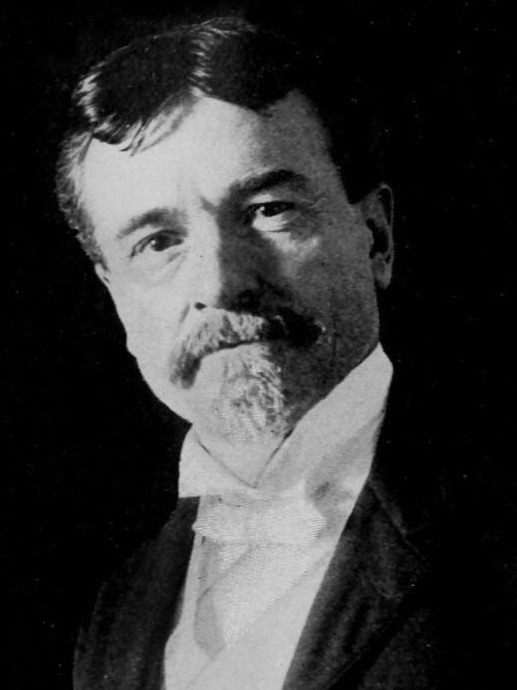
Nominee	John K. Shields	Henry Clay Evans
Party	Democratic	Republican
Popular vote	98,605	59,989
Percentage	62.17%	37.83%
U.S. senator before election
John K. Shields
Democratic
Elected U.S. senator
John K. Shields
Democratic

General election results
Party	Candidate	Votes	%
Democratic	John K. Shields (incumbent)	98,605	62.17%
Republican	Henry Clay Evans	59,989	37.83%
Total votes		158,594	100.00%

== Texas ==
1918 United States Senate election in Texas
- November 5, 1918
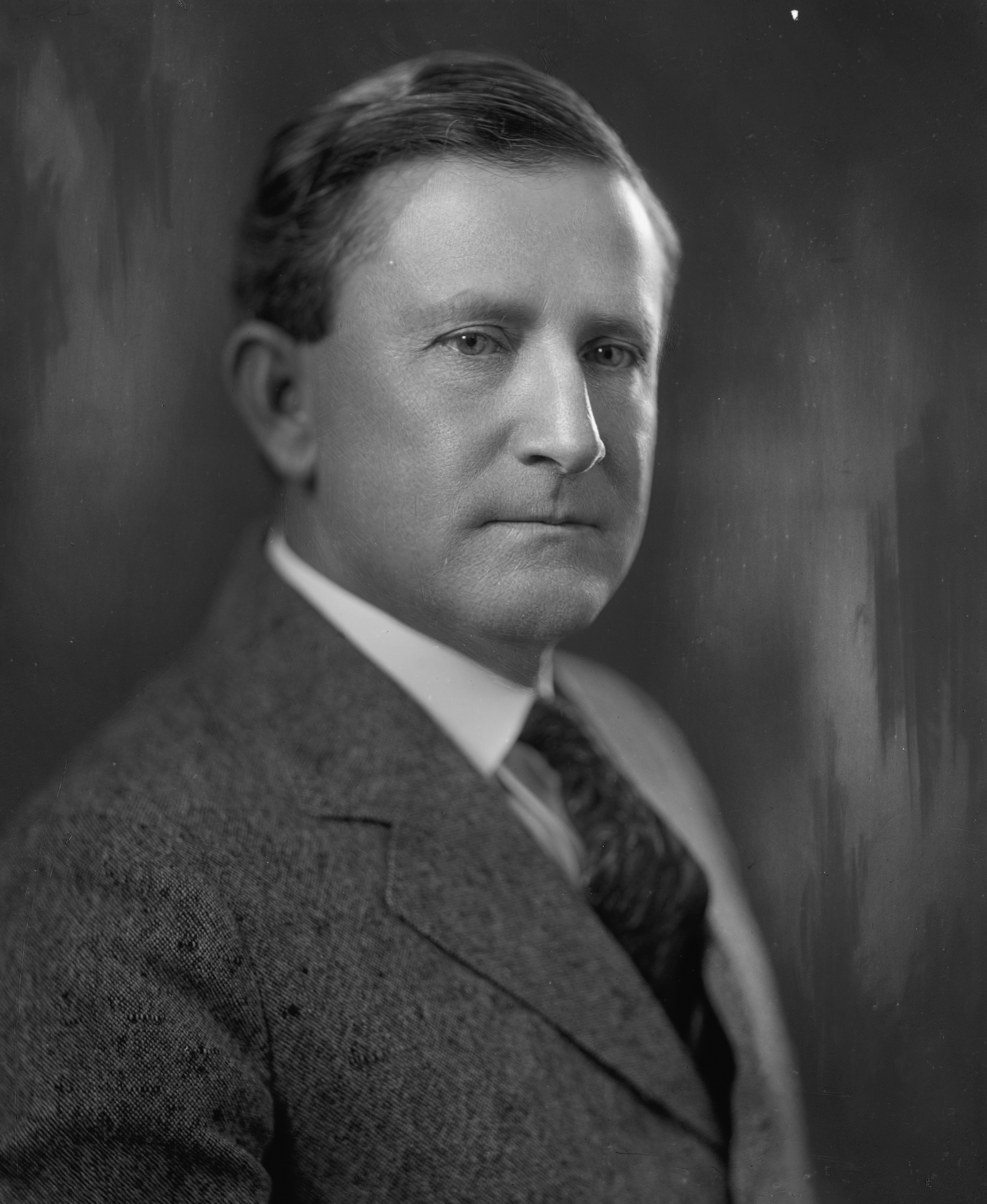

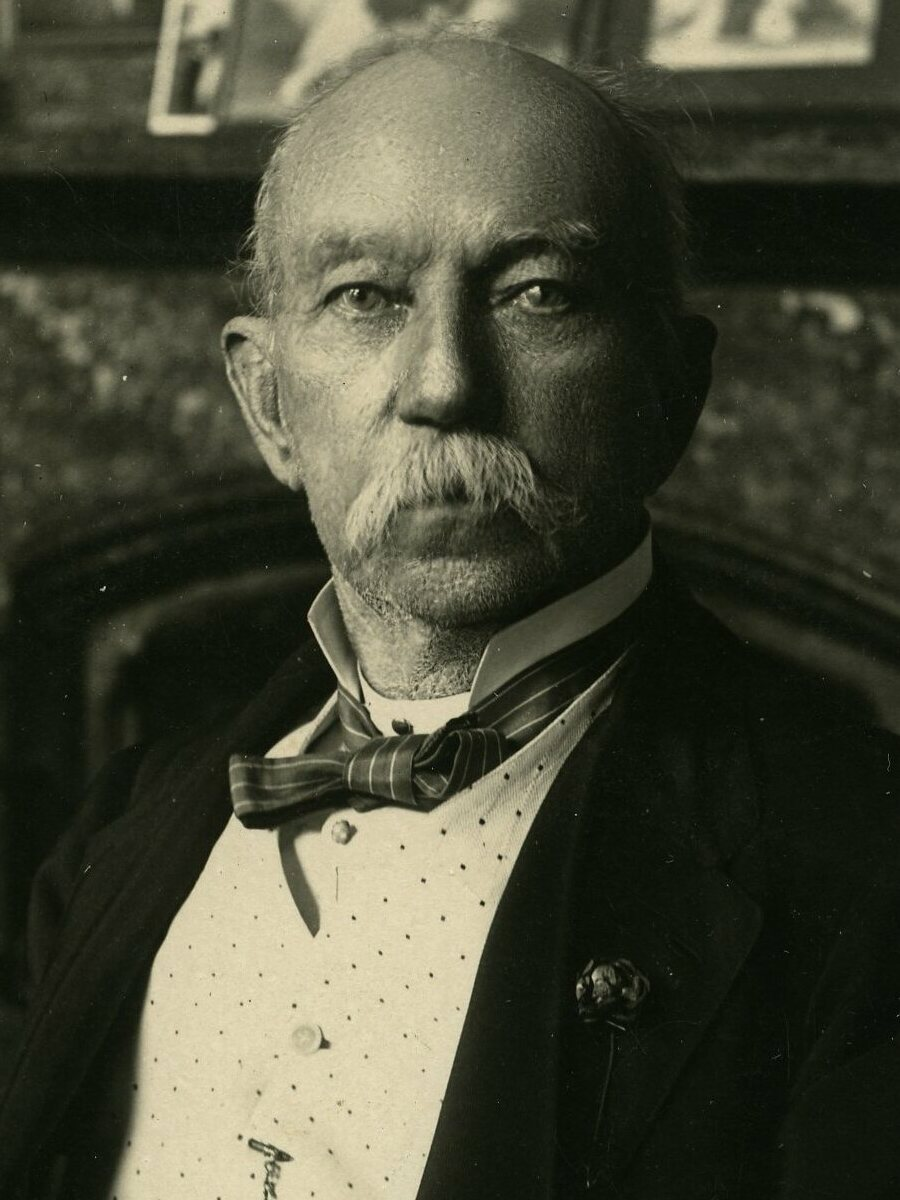
Nominee	Morris Sheppard	Webster Flanagan
Party	Democratic	Republican
Popular vote	155,178	22,214
Percentage	86.69%	12.41%
- County Results Sheppard: 50–60% 60–70% 70–80% 80–90% >90% Flanagan: 50–60% 60–70% No vote
U.S. senator before election
Morris Sheppard
Democratic
Elected U.S. Senator
Morris Sheppard
Democratic

== Virginia ==
1918 United States Senate election in Virginia
- November 5, 1918
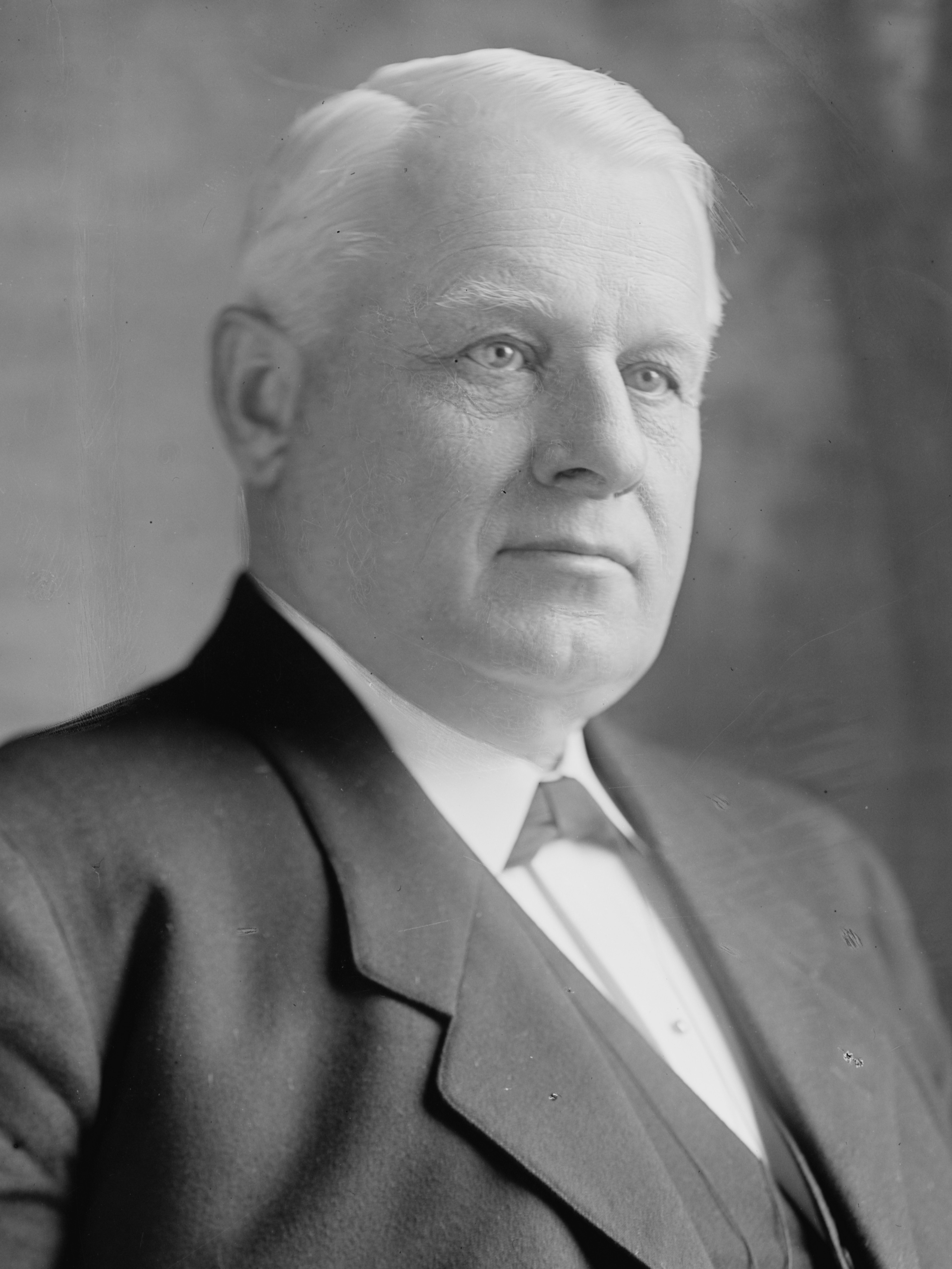
Nominee	Thomas S. Martin
Party	Democratic
Popular vote	40,403
Percentage	100%
U.S. senator before election
Thomas S. Martin
Democratic
Elected U.S. senator
Thomas S. Martin
Democratic

== West Virginia ==
1918 United States Senate election in West Virginia
- November 5, 1918
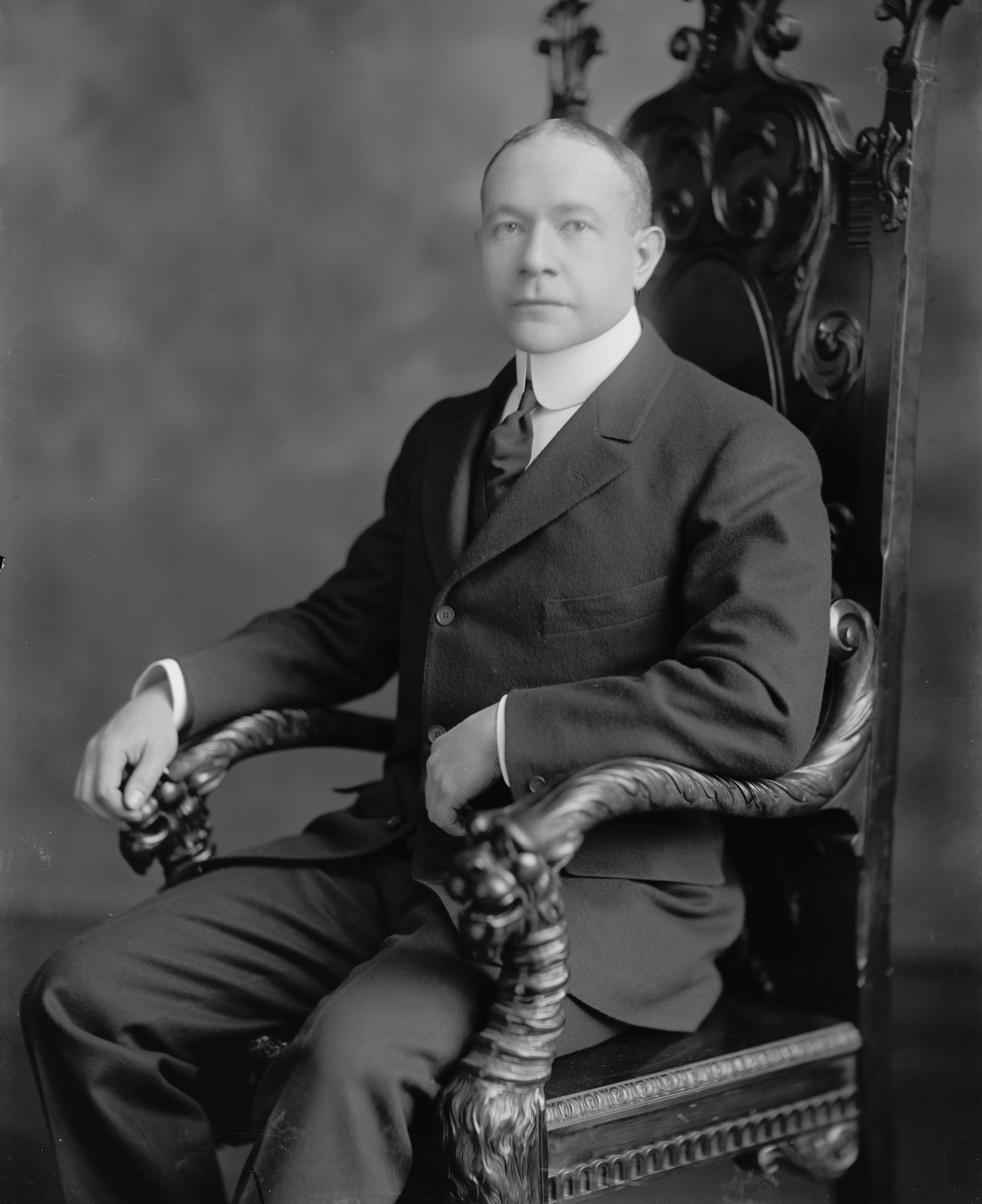

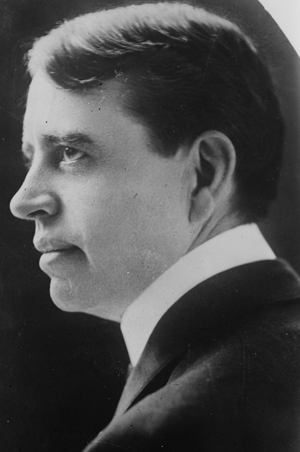
Nominee	Davis Elkins	Clarence W. Watson
Party	Republican	Democratic
Popular vote	115,216	97,715
Percentage	53.53%	45.40%
- County results Elkins: 50–60% 60–70% 70–80% 80–90% Watson: 50–60% 60–70% 70–80%
U.S. senator before election
Nathan Goff Jr.
Republican
Elected U.S. senator
Davis Elkins
Republican

== Wisconsin (special) ==
1918 United States Senate special election in Wisconsin
- April 2, 1918
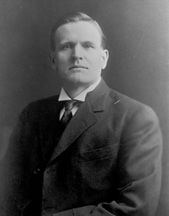

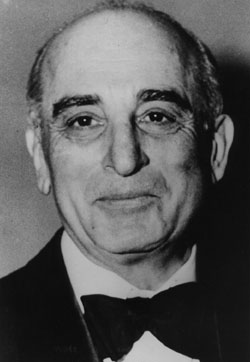

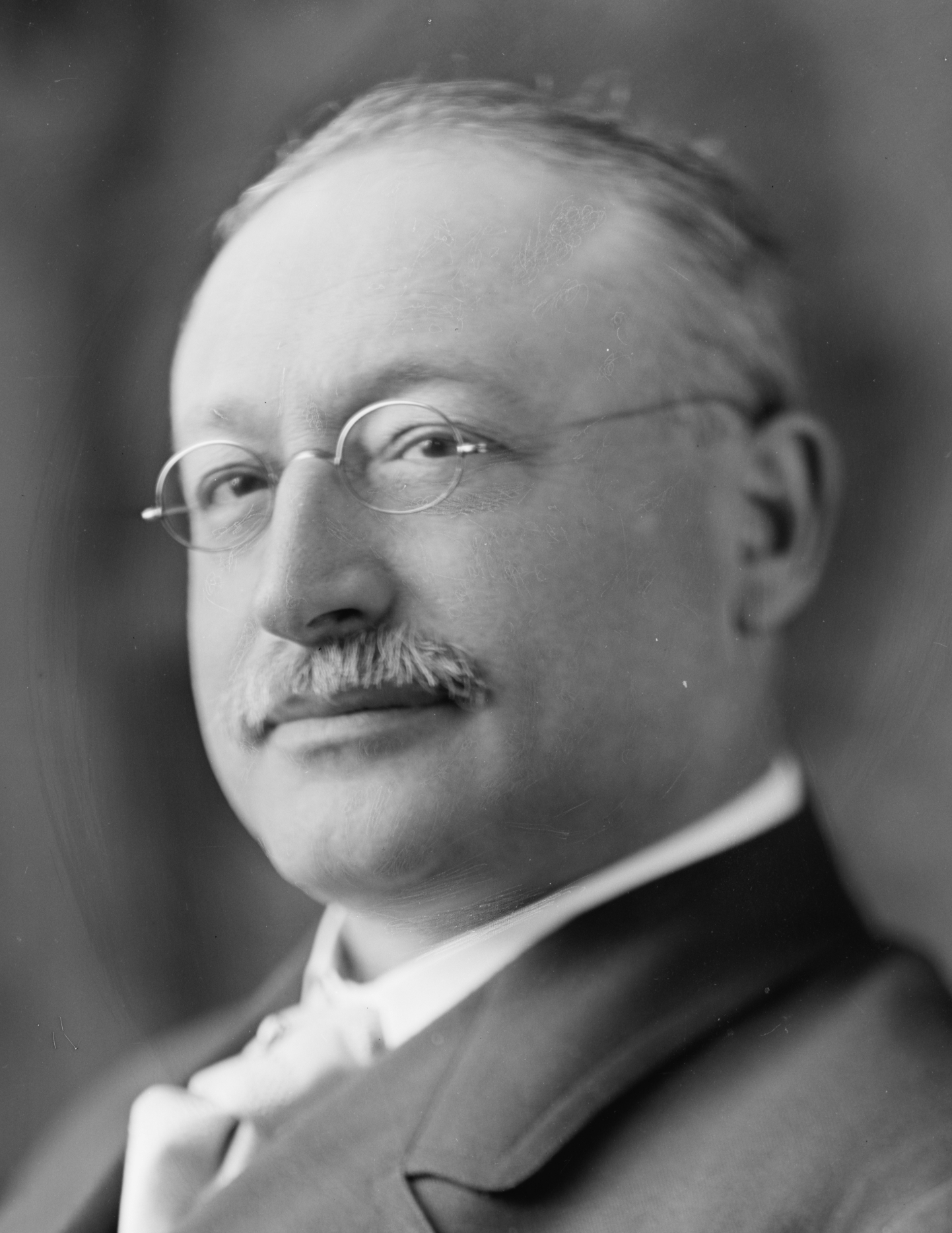
Nominee	Irvine Lenroot	Joseph E. Davies	Victor L. Berger
Party	Republican	Democratic	Socialist
Popular vote	163,983	148,923	110,487
Percentage	38.73%	35.12%	26.09%
- Results by county Lenroot: 30–40% 40–50% 50–60% 60–70% Davies: 30–40% 40–50% 50–60% Berger: 30–40% 40–50% 50–60%
U.S. senator before election
Paul O. Husting
Democratic
Elected U.S. senator
Irvine Lenroot
Republican

Wisconsin election
Party	Candidate	Votes	%
Republican	Irvine Lenroot	163,983	38.73
Democratic	Joseph E. Davies	148,923	35.12
Socialist	Victor L. Berger	110,487	26.09
Prohibition	Anthony J. Benjamin	233	0.06
Write-in	Scattering	371	0.06
Majority		15,060	3.61
Total votes		423,997	100.00
Republican gain from Democratic			

== Wyoming ==
1918 United States Senate election in Wyoming
- November 5, 1918
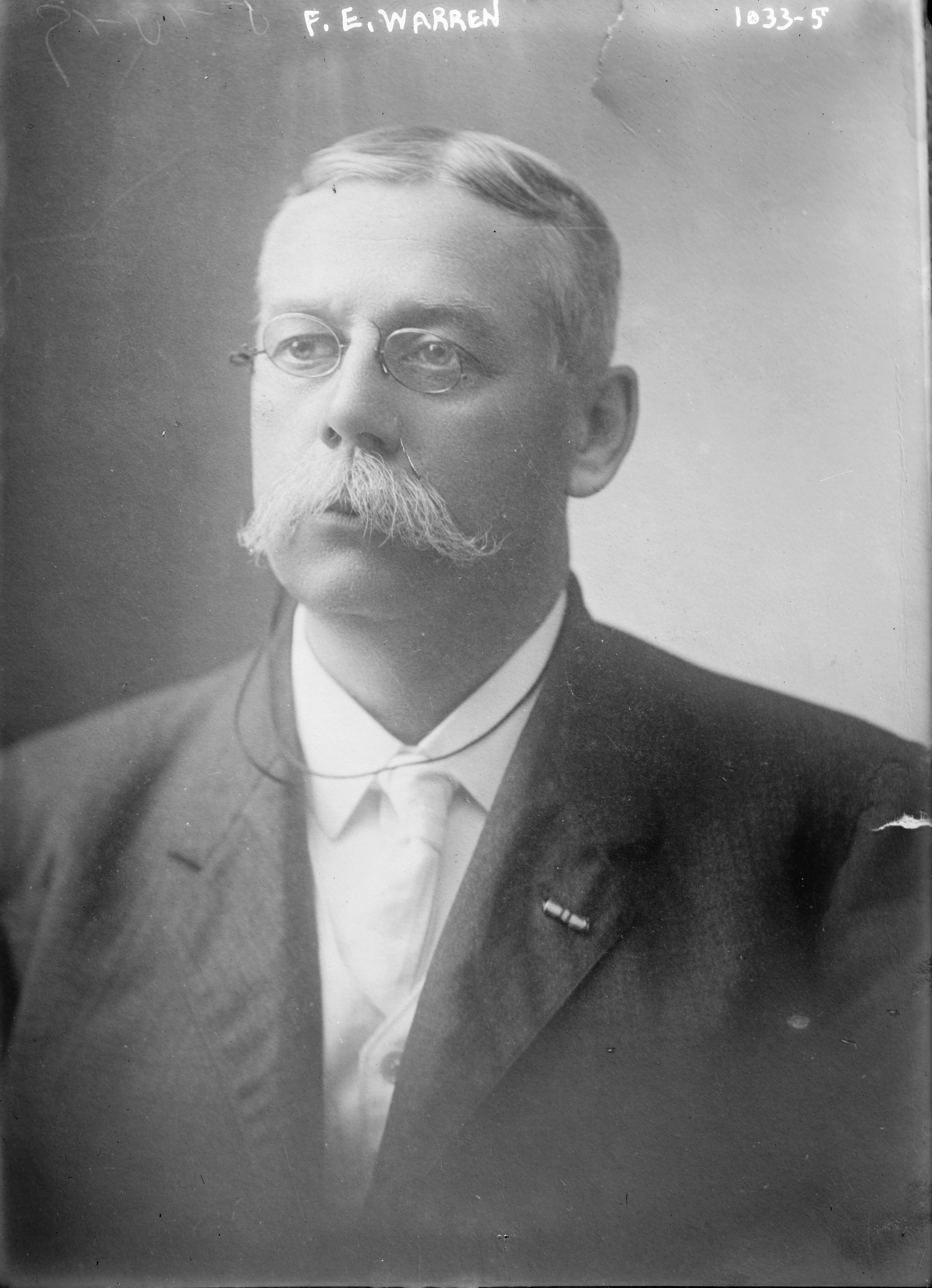

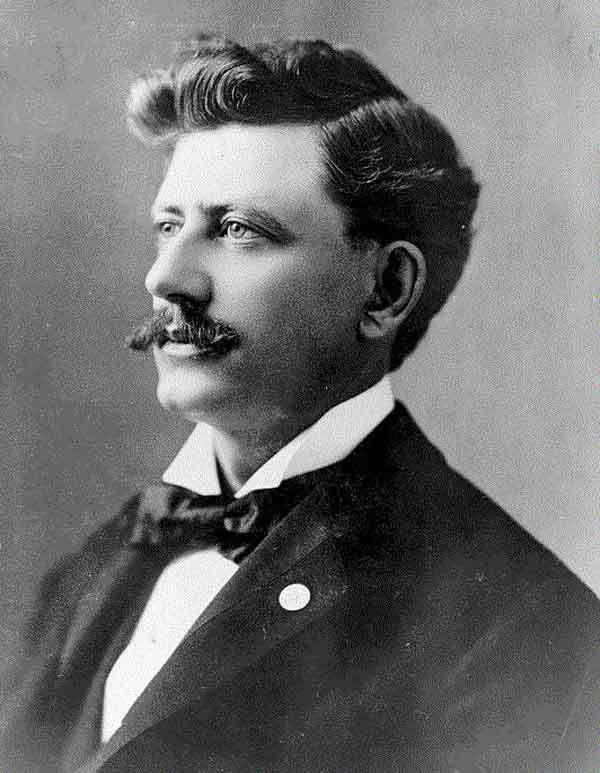
Nominee	Francis E. Warren	John Eugene Osborne
Party	Republican	Democratic
Popular vote	115,216	97,715
Percentage	53.53%	45.40%
- County results Warren: 50–60% 60–70% Osborne: 50–60% No Data/Vote
U.S. senator before election
Francis E. Warren
Republican
Elected U.S. senator
Francis E. Warren
Republican

== See also ==
- 1918 United States elections
  - 1918 United States House of Representatives elections
- 65th United States Congress
- 66th United States Congress
