= Senator Blue =

Senator Blue may refer to:

- Dan Blue (born 1949), North Carolina State Senate
- Richard W. Blue (1841–1907), Kansas State Senate
