= 1918 United States Senate election in Kansas =

- November 5, 1918
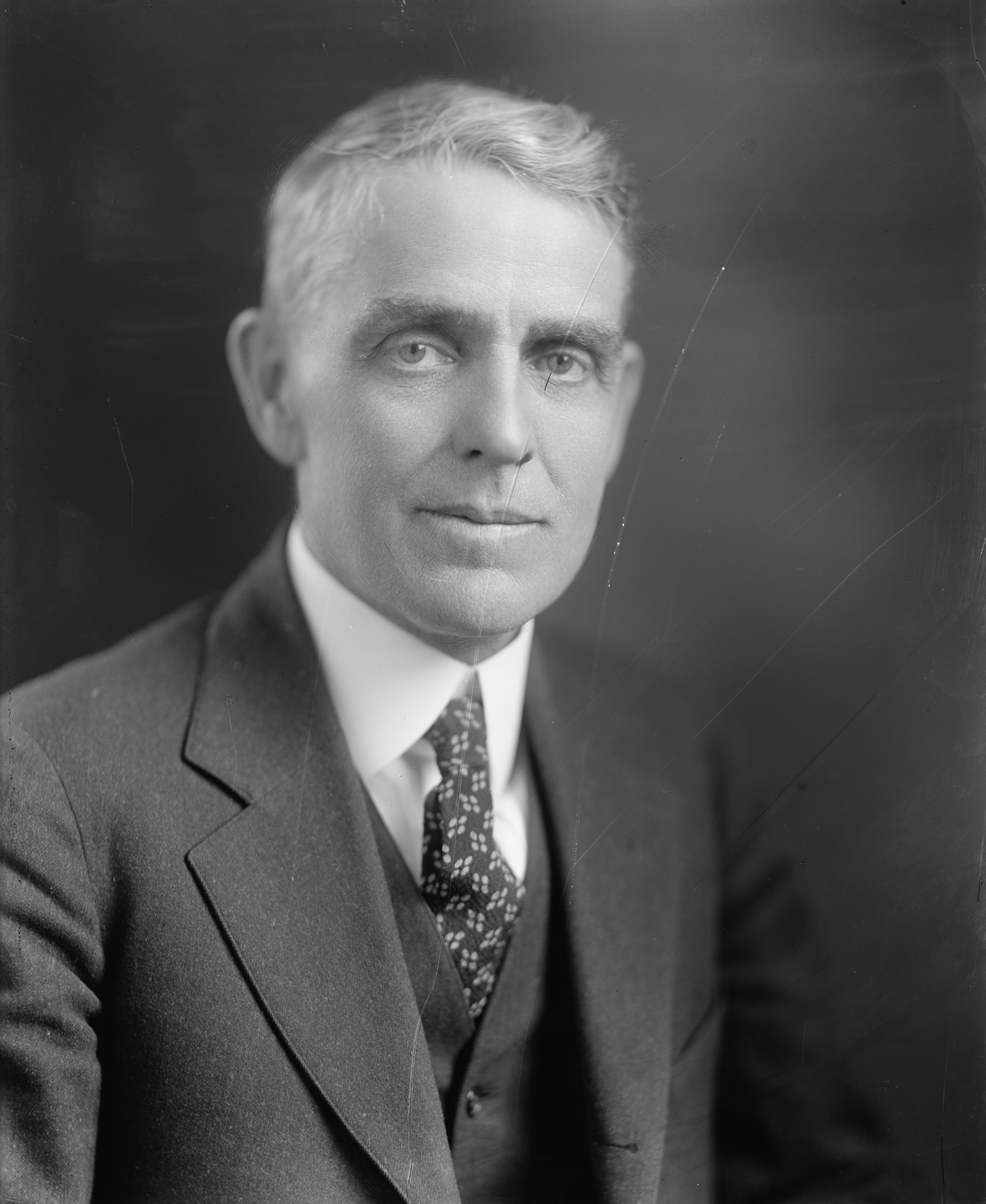

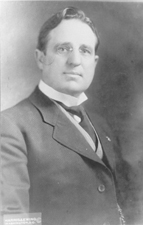
Nominee	Arthur Capper	William H. Thompson
Party	Republican	Democratic
Popular vote	281,931	149,300
Percentage	63.69%	33.73%
- County results Capper: 40–50% 50–60% 60–70% 70–80% 80–90% Thompson: 40–50% 50–60%
U.S. senator before election
William H. Thompson
Democratic
Elected U.S. senator
Arthur Capper
Republican

The 1918 United States Senate election in Kansas was held on November 5, 1918. Incumbent Democratic Senator William H. Thompson ran for re-election to a second term in the first popular election for this seat after the ratification of the Seventeenth Amendment. Thompson was challenged by Governor Arthur Capper, the Republican nominee. Amid a nationwide Republican wave, Thompson lost to Capper in a landslide, winning just 34% of the vote to Capper's 64%.

== Democratic primary ==
=== Candidates ===
- William H. Thompson, incumbent U.S. Senator
- George W. Marble, publisher of the Fort Scott Tribune-Monitor

=== Results ===
Democratic primary results
Party	Candidate	Votes	%
Democratic	William H. Thompson (inc.)	29,080	75.36%
Democratic	George W. Marble	9,510	24.64%
Total votes		38,590	100.00%

== Republican primary ==
=== Candidates ===
- Arthur Capper, Governor of Kansas
- Walter R. Stubbs, former Governor of Kansas
- Charles F. Scott, U.S. Representative from Kansas's 2nd congressional district
- Joseph L. Bristow, former U.S. Senator

=== Results ===
Republican primary results
Party	Candidate	Votes	%
Republican	Arthur Capper	103,120	59.45%
Republican	Walter R. Stubbs	31,614	18.22%
Republican	Charles F. Scott	24,826	14.31%
Republican	Joseph L. Bristow	13,911	8.02%
Total votes		173,471	100.00%

== Socialist primary ==
=== Candidates ===
- Eva Harding, physician

=== Results ===
Socialist primary results
Party	Candidate	Votes	%
Socialist	Eva Harding	1,245	100.00%
Total votes		1,245	100.00%

== General election ==
=== Results ===
1918 United States Senate election in Kansas
Party	Candidate	Votes	%
Republican	Arthur Capper	281,931	63.69%
Democratic	William H. Thompson (inc.)	149,300	33.73%
Socialist	Eva Harding	11,429	2.58%
Write-in		4	0.00%
Majority		132,631	29.96%
Total votes		442,664	100.00%
Republican gain from Democratic			

== See also ==
- 1918 United States Senate elections
