= 1908 Kansas gubernatorial election =

- November 3, 1908
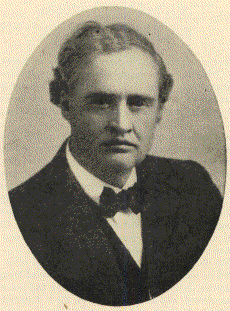

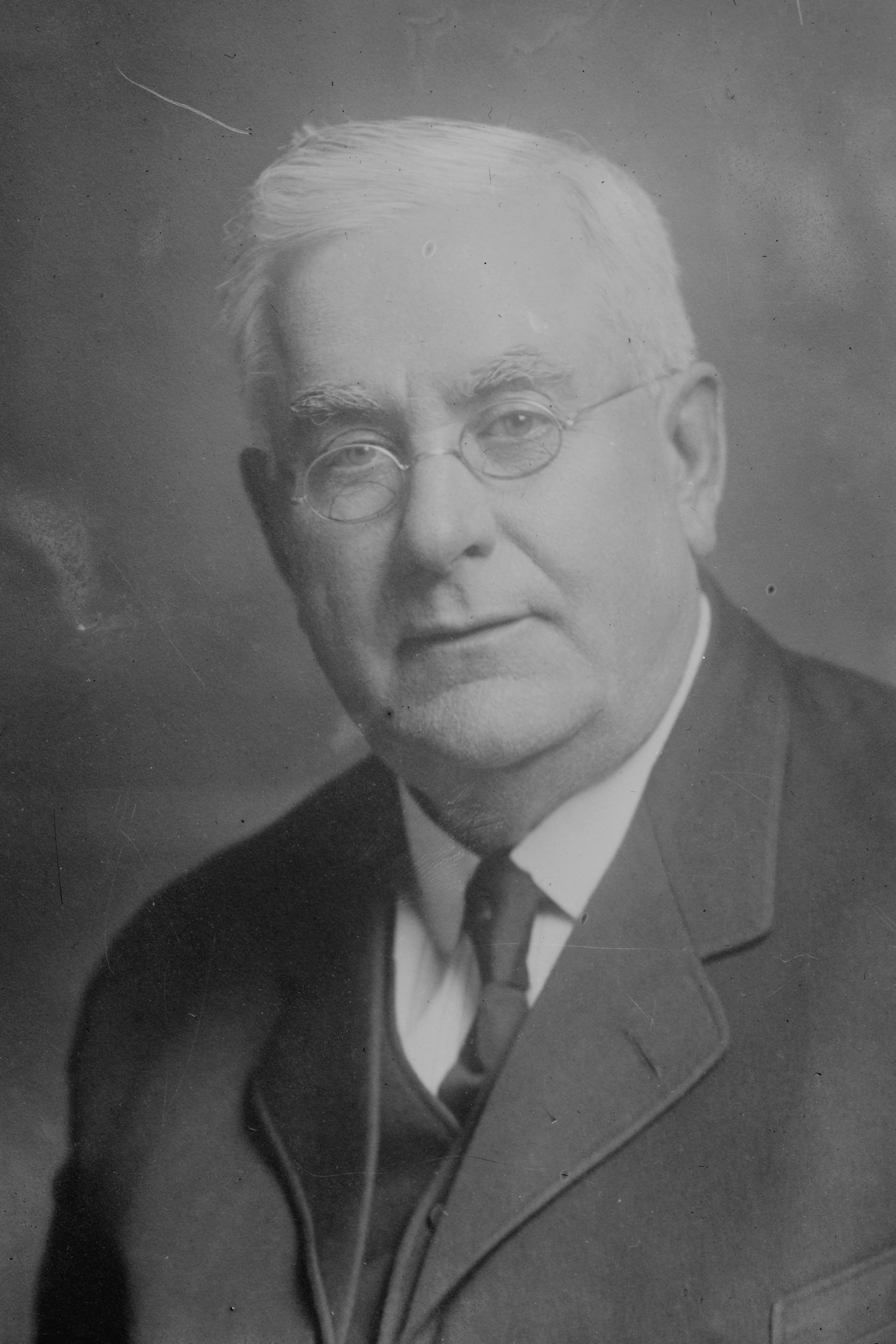
Nominee	Walter R. Stubbs	Jeremiah D. Botkin
Party	Republican	Democratic
Popular vote	196,692	162,385
Percentage	52.49%	43.33%
- County results Stubbs: 40–50% 50–60% 60–70% Botkin: 40–50% 50–60% 60–70%
Governor before election
Edward W. Hoch
Republican
Elected Governor
Walter R. Stubbs
Republican

The 1908 Kansas gubernatorial election was held on November 3, 1908. The Republican nominee Walter R. Stubbs defeated the Democratic nominee Jeremiah D. Botkin, with 52.49% of the vote.

== General election ==
=== Candidates ===
Major party candidates

- Walter R. Stubbs, Republican
- Jeremiah D. Botkin, Democratic

Other candidates

- George F. Hibner, Socialist
- Alfred L. Hope, Prohibition
- John W. Northrop, Independent

=== Results ===
1908 Kansas gubernatorial election
Party	Candidate	Votes	%	±%
Republican	Walter R. Stubbs	196,692	52.49%	
Democratic	Jeremiah D. Botkin	162,385	43.33%	
Socialist	George F. Hibner	11,721	3.13%	
Prohibition	Alfred L. Hope	3,886	1.04%	
Independent	John W. Northrop	68	0.02%	
Majority		34,307		
Turnout				
Republican hold		Swing		
