= 1924 United States Senate election in Kansas =

- November 4, 1924
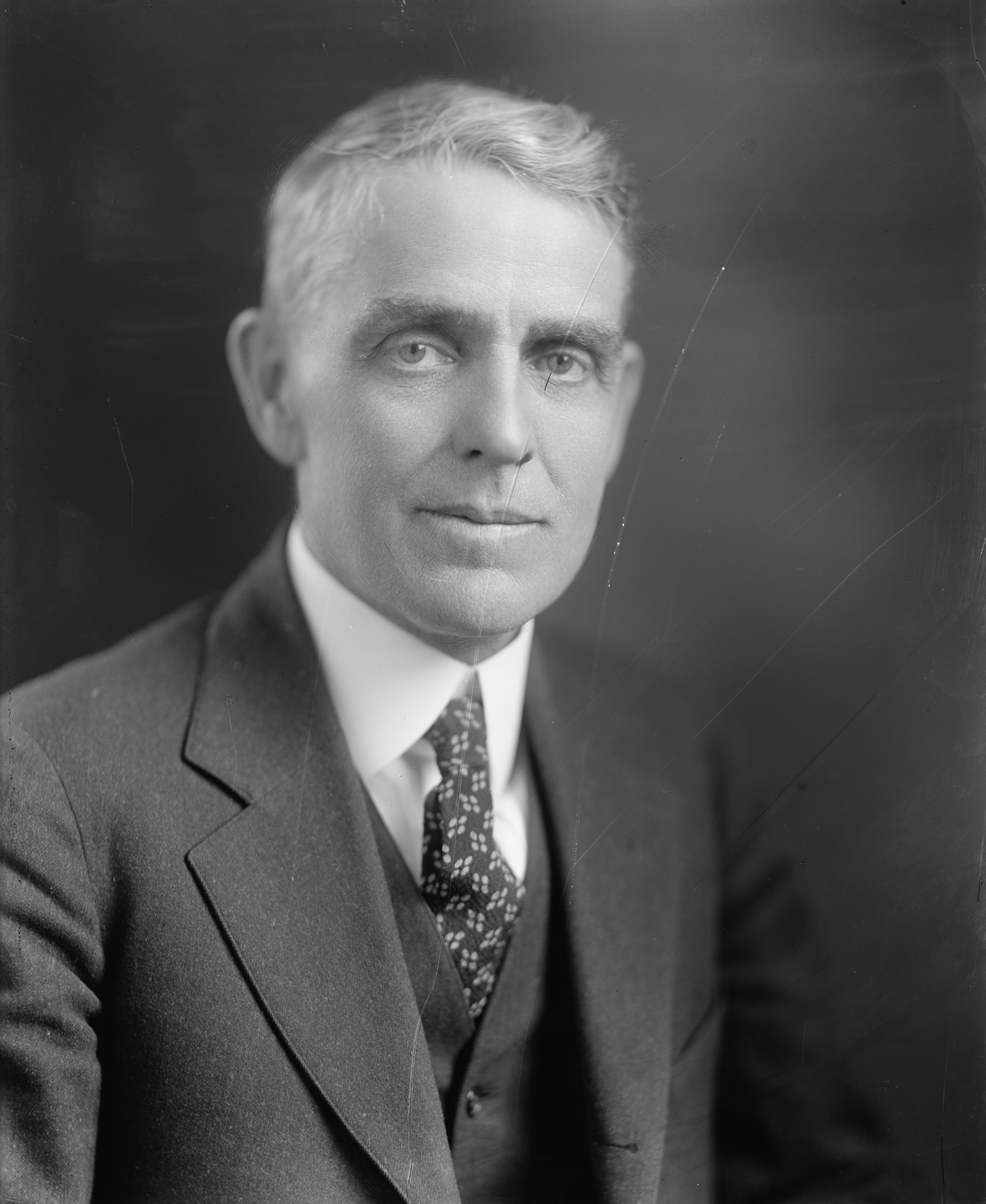

Nominee	Arthur Capper	James Malone
Party	Republican	Democratic
Popular vote	428,494	154,189
Percentage	70.10%	25.22%
- County results Capper: 50–60% 60–70% 70–80% 80–90% Davis: 50–60%
U.S. senator before election
Arthur Capper
Republican
Elected U.S. Senator
Arthur Capper
Republican

The 1924 United States Senate election in Kansas was held on November 4, 1924. Incumbent Republican Senator Arthur Capper ran for re-election to a second term. He was challenged by State Senator James Malone, the Democratic nominee. Capper won re-election in a landslide, winning 70% of the vote and outperforming Republican President Calvin Coolidge, who also won the state in the 1924 presidential election.

== Democratic primary ==
=== Candidates ===
- James Malone, State Senator
- Edward T. Hackney, Kansas Public Utilities Commissioner
- Ben S. Gaitskill, Mayor of Girard
- Sam Houston Carr, Parsons attorney and former Interior Department official
- Edward E. Sapp, former Cherokee County District Court Judge

=== Results ===
Democratic primary results
Party	Candidate	Votes	%
Democratic	James Malone	19,477	30.21%
Democratic	Edward T. Hackney	15,315	23.76%
Democratic	Ben S. Gaitskill	11,377	17.65%
Democratic	Sam Houston Carr	9,483	14.71%
Democratic	Edward E. Sapp	8,817	13.68%
Total votes		64,469	100.00%

== Republican primary ==
=== Candidates ===
- Arthur Capper, incumbent U.S. Senator
- Sheffield Ingalls, former Lieutenant Governor of Kansas
- Tom D. Smith, Hiawatha attorney

=== Results ===
Republican primary results
Party	Candidate	Votes	%
Republican	Arthur Capper (inc.)	169,037	71.47%
Republican	Sheffield Ingalls	50,783	21.47%
Republican	Tom D. Smith	16,704	7.06%
Total votes		236,524	100.00%

== Socialist primary ==
=== Candidates ===
- S. O. Coble

=== Results ===
Socialist primary results
Party	Candidate	Votes	%
Socialist	S. O. Coble	272	100.00%
Total votes		272	100.00%

== General election ==
=== Results ===
1924 United States Senate election in Kansas
Party	Candidate	Votes	%	±%
Republican	Arthur Capper (inc.)	428,494	70.10%	+6.41%
Democratic	James Malone	154,189	25.22%	−8.50%
Independent	Fred J. Fraley	23,266	3.81%	—
Socialist	S. O. Coble	5,340	0.87%	−1.71%
Majority		274,305	44.87%	+14.91%
Total votes		611,290	100.00%	
Republican hold				

== See also ==
- 1924 United States Senate elections
