= Governor Stubbs =

Governor Stubbs may refer to:

- Walter R. Stubbs (1858–1929), 18th Governor of Kansas from 1909 to 1913
- Reginald Edward Stubbs (1876–1947), Governor of Hong Kong from 1919 to 1925, Governor of Jamaica from 1926 to 1932, Governor of Cyprus from 1932 to 1933, and Governor of Ceylon from 1933 to 1937
