= Fred Zutavern =

American politician

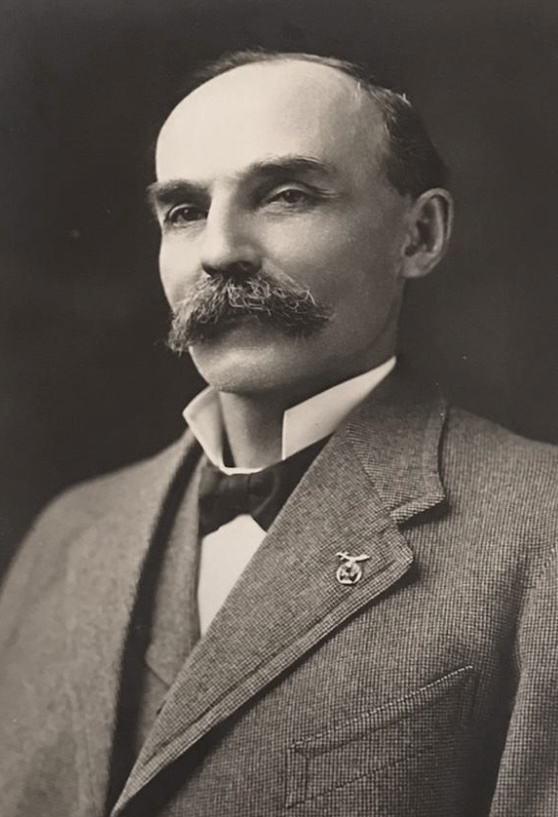

Member of the Kansas House of Representatives from the 78th district
- In office January 1913 – January 1917

Personal details
- Born: February 17, 1851 Grünstadt, Germany
- Died: February 28, 1926 (aged 75) Great Bend, Kansas
- Party: Democratic
- Spouse: Nora Estelle Brinkman
- Profession: Hardware Store Owner

Fred Zutavern was an American politician and business owner who served two terms in the Kansas House of Representatives as the Representative from the 78th District in Barton County, Kansas.

Representative Zutavern was born on February 17, 1851, in Grünstadt, Germany. In 1870, Zutavern was a founding member of the TG Grünstadt (Grünstadt Gymnastics Society). Soon afterwards, Fritz Zutavern emigrated to the US. He founded a hardware company in Lakin, Kansas, married Nora Estelle Brinkman (1863–1937) in 1883, with whom he had several children, settled in Great Bend, Kansas, and was elected to the state House of Representatives in 1912 as a Republican and in 1914 as a Democrat. He switched parties due to his opposition to Prohibition.

During his first term in the Kansas of Representatives in 1913, Representative Zutavern introduced bills to punish those who buy or possess liquor in the state of Kansas, to prohibit the teaching of religion in Kansas public schools and to provide salaries for undersheriffs in counties with a population of between 18,000 and 25,000 people. On February 10, 1913, he motioned to adjourn the House of Representatives so that House members could attend a reception honoring Gov. George H. Hodges and First Lady Ora Hodges.

Among the bills Representative Zutavern supported in 1913 were legislation to require county registers of deeds to proof read all documents filed with their offices, to provide uniformity to bills of lading, to require trains to be protected by competent flagmen, to provide new powers to local governments of smaller cities regarding street paving and the creation of gutters, and bills to abolish the elective office of county printer in Anderson County, Barber County and Linn County. Representative Zutavern voted in favor of legislation to create a pension fund for firefighters, widows of firefighters and minor children of deceased firefighters. On March 5, 1913, Representative Zutavern voted against a bill to require county treasurers to make a monthly payment of state taxes to the Kansas state treasurer.

During his 1914 campaign for reelection he was rated satisfactory by the Kansas Medical Society for his responses to questions with regards to supporting the repeal of legislation related to chiropractor practice, the creation of one regulatory board for all aspects of medical practice, opposition to legislation that would allow cults to practice medicine and to advocate for full funding of the state Board of Health. The Kansas Medical Society also gave a satisfactory rating to his Progressive Party opponent, W. H. Maybach.

On January 20, 1915, Representative Zutavern sponsored House Resolution 20, which required the sergeant-at-arms of the Kansas House of Representatives to provide disinfected drinking cups to each member of the House of Representatives. The resolution passed. On February 16, 1915, Representative Zutavern voted in favor of bills to provide for the State of Kansas to present an exhibit at the International Soils-Products Exposition in Denver, Colorado, from September 27 to October 9, 1915, to pay the salary of the caretaker at John Brown Memorial Park, to fund the management of Historic State Park in Pawnee Rock, Kansas, to provide for a system of electric lights on the grounds of the Kansas Capitol in Topeka, Kansas, and to fund the purchase of coal for institutions under the State Board of Control of State Charitable Institutions.

Representative Zutavern hosted a Pastorius Day celebration at his orchard in Great Bend on October 7, 1894.

Fred Zutavern never lost touch with his old home. He was an honorary member of the Turngesellschaft Grünstadt, to which he donated larger amounts each year for the construction of a gymnasium, which was inaugurated in 1913. Over the years, he had transferred an amount equal to the number of members of the sports club every Christmas. When he died in 1926, Turngesellschaft Grünstadt published an obituary in the local newspaper.

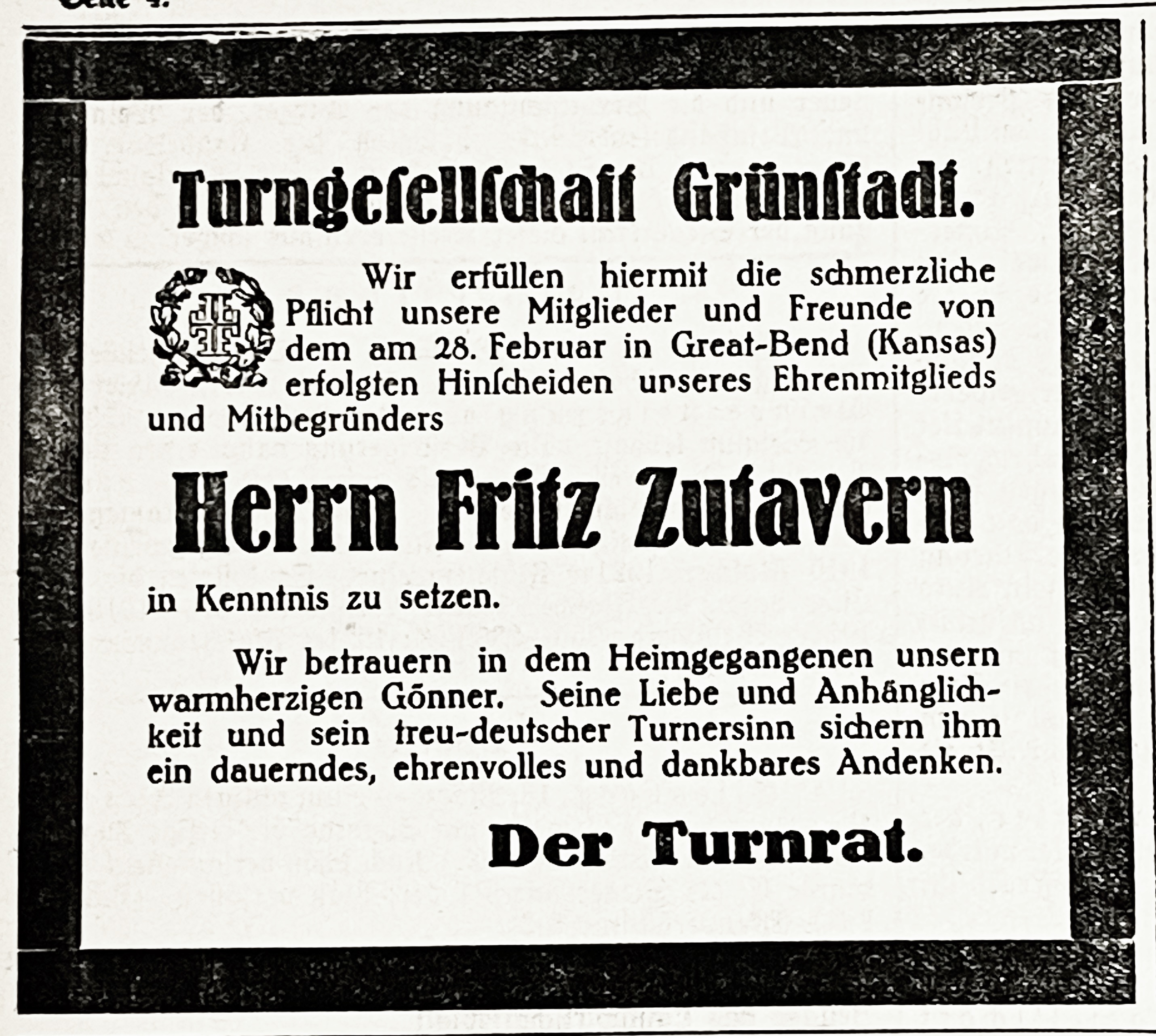
Obituary Fred Zutavern, Grünstadter Zeitung, 1926

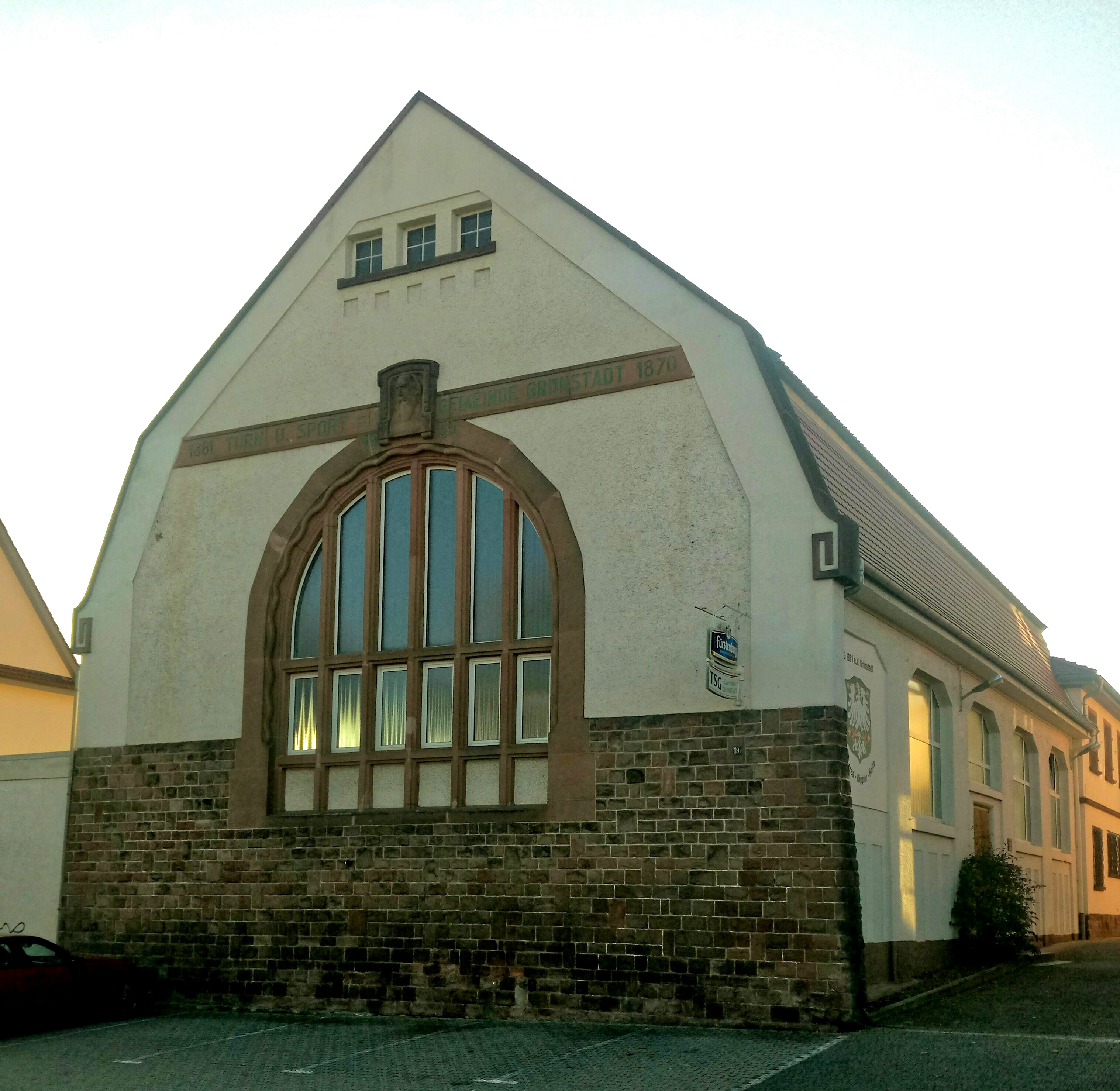
Grünstadt gymnasium, Asselheimer Straße 19, built by Fred Zutavern's donations

1913–1914 Kansas House of Representatives Committee assignments

- Labor Committee
- Militia Committee
- Cities of the Second Class Committee
- Elections Committee
- Mileage Committee
- State Museum Committee

1915–1916 Kansas House of Representatives Committee assignments

- Cities of the Second Class Committee
- Public Utilities Committee
- Militia Committee
- State Museum Committee
- Penal Institutions Committee

1914 election results

- Democrat Fred Zutavern: 2,641
- Progressive W. H. Maybach: 2,270
