= 1912 Kansas gubernatorial election =

- November 5, 1912
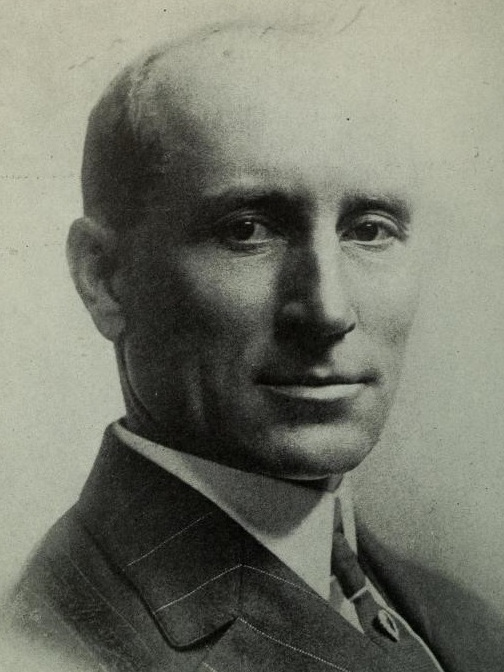

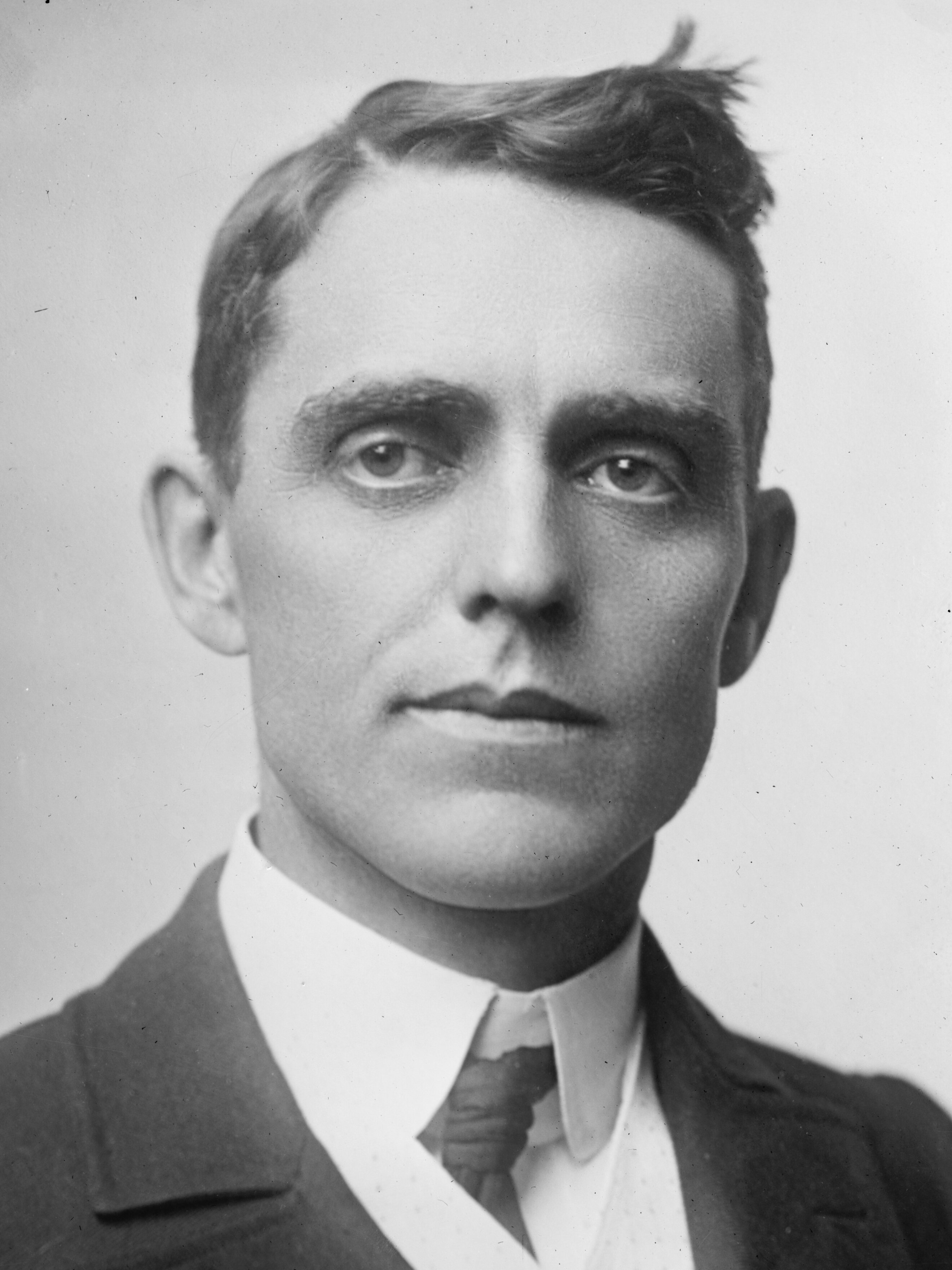

Nominee	George H. Hodges	Arthur Capper	George W. Kleihege
Party	Democratic	Republican	Socialist
Popular vote	167,437	167,408	24,767
Percentage	46.55%	46.54%	6.89%
- County results Hodges: 30–40% 40–50% 50–60% 60–70% Capper: 40–50% 50–60% 60–70%
Governor before election
Walter R. Stubbs
Republican
Elected Governor
George H. Hodges
Democratic

The 1912 Kansas gubernatorial election was held on November 5, 1912. Democratic nominee George H. Hodges narrowly defeated Republican nominee Arthur Capper with 46.55% of the vote, winning by 29 votes or .01%.

== General election ==
=== Candidates ===
Major party candidates

- George H. Hodges, Democratic
- Arthur Capper, Republican

Other candidates

- George W. Kleihege, Socialist

=== Results ===
1912 Kansas gubernatorial election
Party	Candidate	Votes	%	±%
Democratic	George H. Hodges	167,437	46.55%	
Republican	Arthur Capper	167,408	46.54%	
Socialist	George W. Kleihege	24,767	6.89%	
Majority		29	.01%	
Turnout				
Democratic gain from Republican		Swing		
