= Arthur Capper =

American politician (1865–1951)

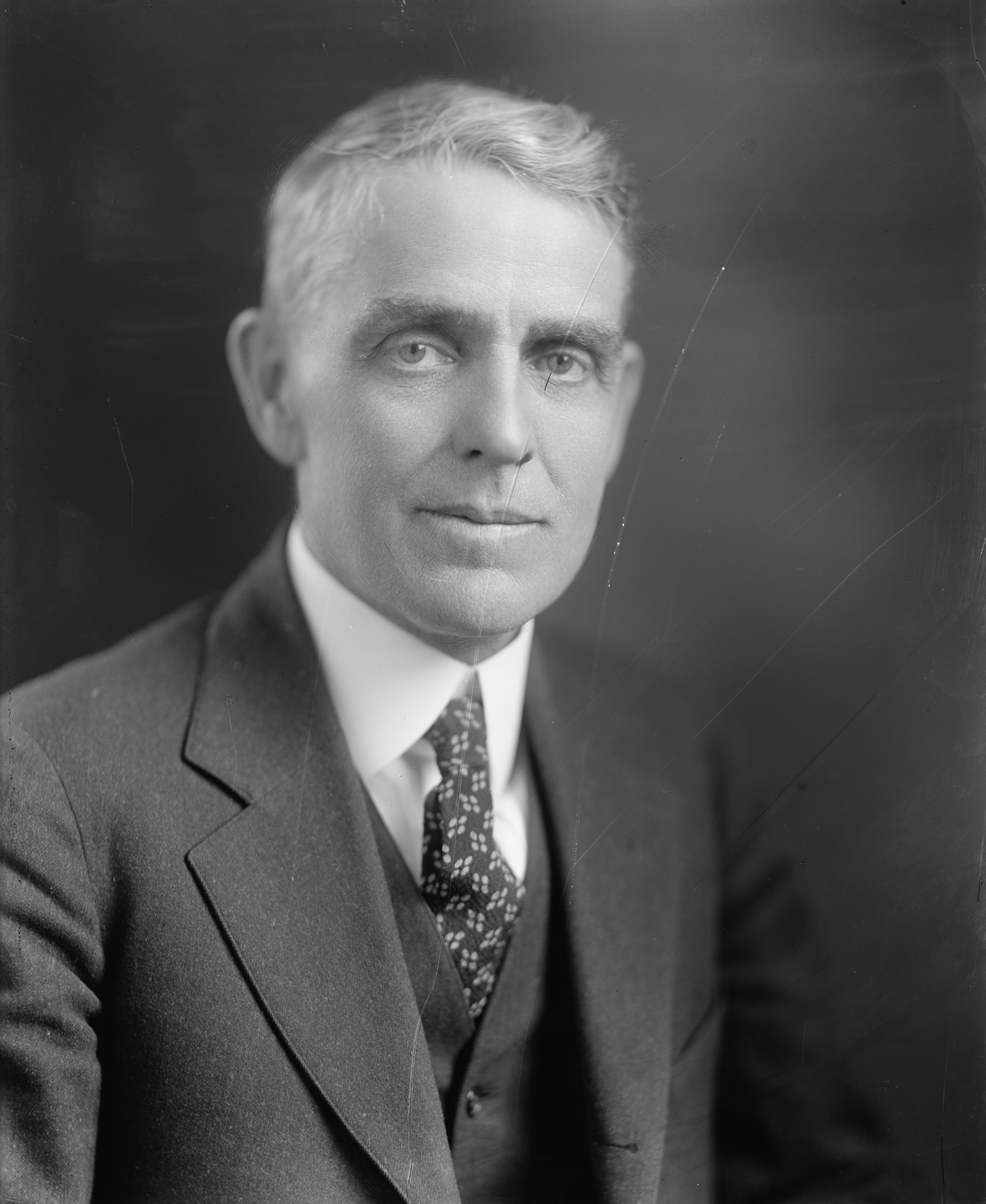
- Capper, 1905–1945

United States Senator from Kansas
- In office March 4, 1919 – January 3, 1949
- Preceded by: William Thompson
- Succeeded by: Andrew Schoeppel
Committee positions
Chair of the Senate Agriculture Committee
In office January 3, 1947 – January 3, 1949
Preceded by	Elmer Thomas
Succeeded by	Elmer Thomas
Ranking Member of the Senate Agriculture Committee
In office January 3, 1943 – January 3, 1947
Preceded by	George Norris
Succeeded by	Elmer Thomas

Chair of the National Governors Association
- In office December 14, 1916 – September 16, 1918
- Preceded by: William Spry
- Succeeded by: Emerson Harrington

20th Governor of Kansas
- In office January 11, 1915 – January 13, 1919
- Lieutenant: William Yoast Morgan
- Preceded by: George H. Hodges
- Succeeded by: Henry Allen

Personal details
- Born: July 14, 1865 Garnett, Kansas, U.S.
- Died: December 19, 1951 (aged 86) Topeka, Kansas, U.S.
- Party: Republican
- Spouse: Florence Crawford

Arthur Capper (July 14, 1865 – December 19, 1951) was an American politician from Kansas. He was the 20th governor of Kansas (the first to have been born in the state) from 1915 to 1919 and a United States senator from 1919 to 1949. He also owned a radio station (WIBW in Topeka), and was the publisher of a newspaper, the Topeka Daily Capital.

== Life and career ==
Capper was born in Garnett, Kansas. He attended the public schools and learned the art of printing. He became a newspaper publisher, eventually owning several newspapers and two radio stations. The best-known of his publications, Capper's Weekly, had an enormous readership among farm families and served as the base of his political support in Kansas. Capper's continues today as a bimonthly glossy magazine that focuses on rural living.

Capper first entered politics in 1912 when he became the Republican candidate for governor of Kansas. In addition to a reputation built from his newspapers, he was also the son-in-law of former governor Samuel J. Crawford. He was defeated by Democrat George H. Hodges. However, Capper was elected governor in the next election in 1914 and served as governor of Kansas from 1915 until 1919, winning re-election in 1916. He was the first native Kansan to serve as the state's governor.

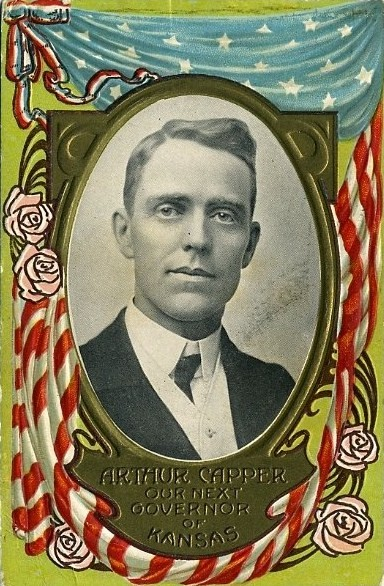
Postcard for 1912 campaign for governor

Having served two full terms as governor, Capper was not permitted to run for a third term by the Kansas State Constitution. Instead, in 1918 he ran for election to the United States Senate and won. Capper became a long-serving senator, representing Kansas for five 6-year terms. He was in the Senate from 1919 to 1949 and was prominent among Republicans who supported the relief efforts and other policies of Franklin Delano Roosevelt's administration. He did not seek reelection in 1948.

Capper was particularly interested in issues relating to agriculture. Before his time as governor, he served as president of the Board of Regents of Kansas State Agricultural College (now known as Kansas State University) from 1910 to 1913. While in the United States Senate, he at times served as chairman of the Committee of Expenditures of the Department of Agriculture and the Committee on Agriculture and Forestry. He also at times served as chairman of the Committee on Claims and the Committee on the District of Columbia. In the latter role he played a crucial part in starting the D.C. Alley Dwelling Authority in 1934, the first housing authority in the country. He co-sponsored the Capper–Volstead Act. In 1923 Senator Capper brought forward a constitutional amendment with an anti-miscegenation provision outlawing mixed-race marriages, but struck out the passage after protest from African-American organizations. According to a Time Magazine article at the time:

[T]he Senator regards the provision as an unnecessary troublemaker. The withdrawal of this section by the Senator is made easier because he himself did not write the bill. It was drawn by the attorney of the American Federation of Women's Clubs.

In April 1943 a confidential analysis by British scholar Isaiah Berlin of the Senate Foreign Relations Committee for the British Foreign Office described Capper as:

a solid, stolid, 78-year-old reactionary from the corn belt, who is the very voice of Mid-Western "grass root" isolationism. A newspaper proprietor who was once described as contriving to sit on the fence and keep both ears on the ground at the same time. Like Johnson and Nye, an unwavering opponent of all the Administration's foreign policies, including reciprocal trade.

Capper became chairman of the Senate's Agriculture Committee in 1946; by that point, at the age of 81, he was nearly deaf and his speech was difficult to understand. He joined the Congressional Flying Club in 1947 at the age of 82 and took up flying lessons, as the oldest member of Congress, from Pearle Robinson, part owner of the Hybla Valley Airport just outside of Washington, D.C.

After retiring from the Senate, Capper returned to his home in Topeka, Kansas, where he continued in the newspaper publishing business until his death. He was buried in Topeka Cemetery in a plot adjacent to Governor Crawford.

LEGACY

Senator Capper founded the Capper Foundation, where infants, children, teens, and adults, as well as their families from 16 counties and 46 cities across Kansas, receive individualized care and therapies.

https://www.capper.org/wp-content/uploads/2023/09/AC-and-Child-Sepia.jpg

https://www.capper.org/wp-content/uploads/2023/09/Arthur-Capper-boy1-1-1536x1062.jpg

== Capper publications ==
Arthur Capper was the owner of the Capper Building in Topeka, Kansas, and the Capper publications, which over time included the Daily Capital (Topeka, Kansas), the North Topeka Mail, the Kansas Breeze (which later merged with the Mail to form Farmers Mail and Breeze), Missouri Valley Farmer, Capper’s Weekly, Nebraska Farm Journal, Missouri Ruralist, Oklahoma Farmer, and The Household Magazine.

A collection of his correspondences includes two letters of complaint from inmates at Parsons State Hospital.

== See also ==
- List of covers of Time magazine (1920s) – January 18, 1926

Party political offices
Preceded by Walter R. Stubbs	Republican nominee for Governor of Kansas; 1912, 1914, 1916	Succeeded by Henry Allen
Preceded by Walter R. Stubbs	Republican nominee for U.S. Senator from Kansas (Class 2); 1918, 1924, 1930, 1936, 1942	Succeeded by Andrew Schoeppel
Political offices
Preceded by George H. Hodges	Governor of Kansas; 1915–1919	Succeeded by Henry Allen
Preceded by William Spry	Chair of the National Governors Association; 1916–1918	Succeeded by Emerson Harrington
U.S. Senate
Preceded by William Thompson	United States Senator (Class 2) from Kansas; 1919–1949; Served alongside: Charles Curtis, Henry Allen, George McGill, Clyde M. Reed	Succeeded by Andrew Schoeppel
Preceded by Elmer Thomas	Chair of the Senate Agriculture Committee; 1947–1949	Succeeded by Elmer Thomas
