= 1920 United States Senate election in Kansas =

- November 2, 1920
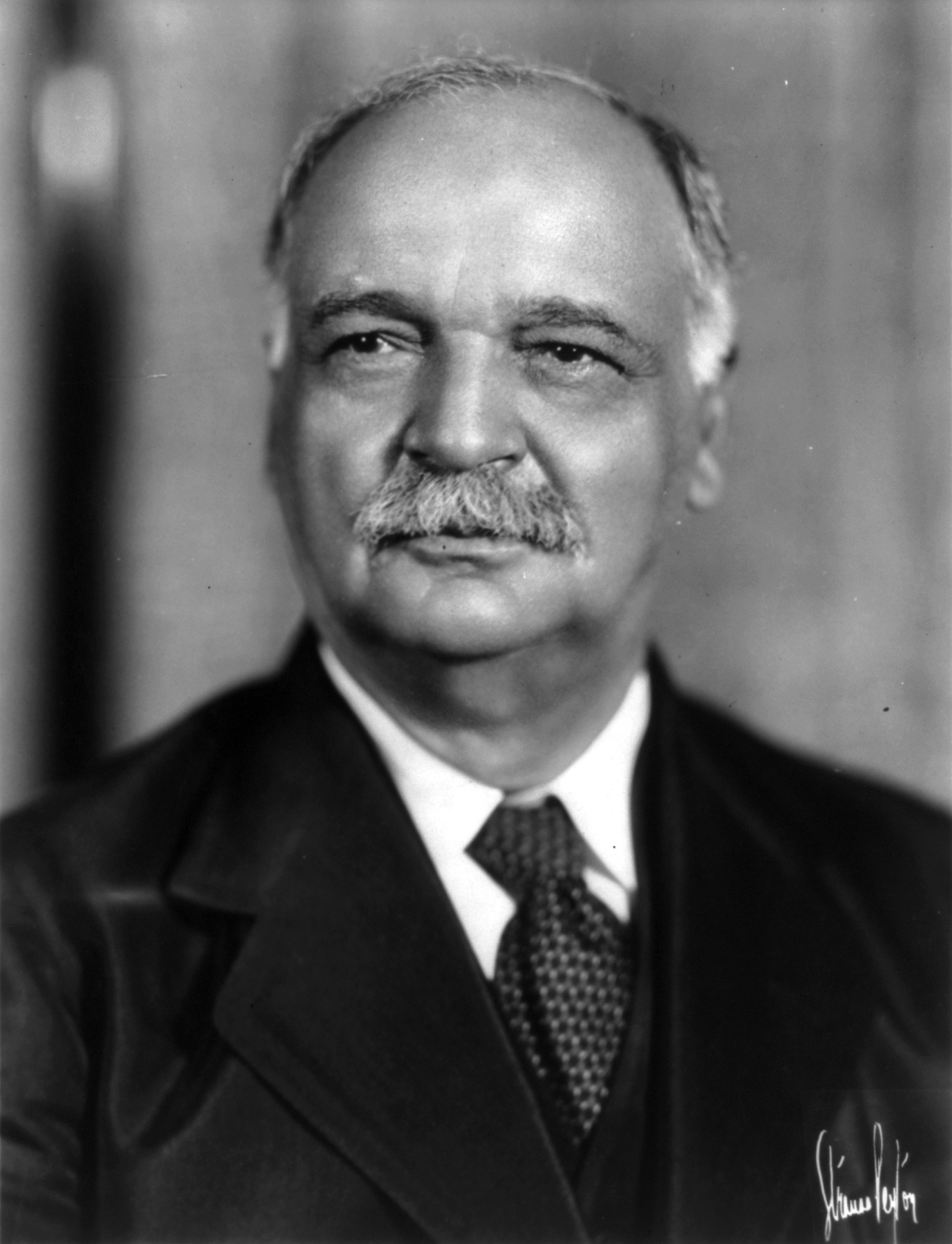

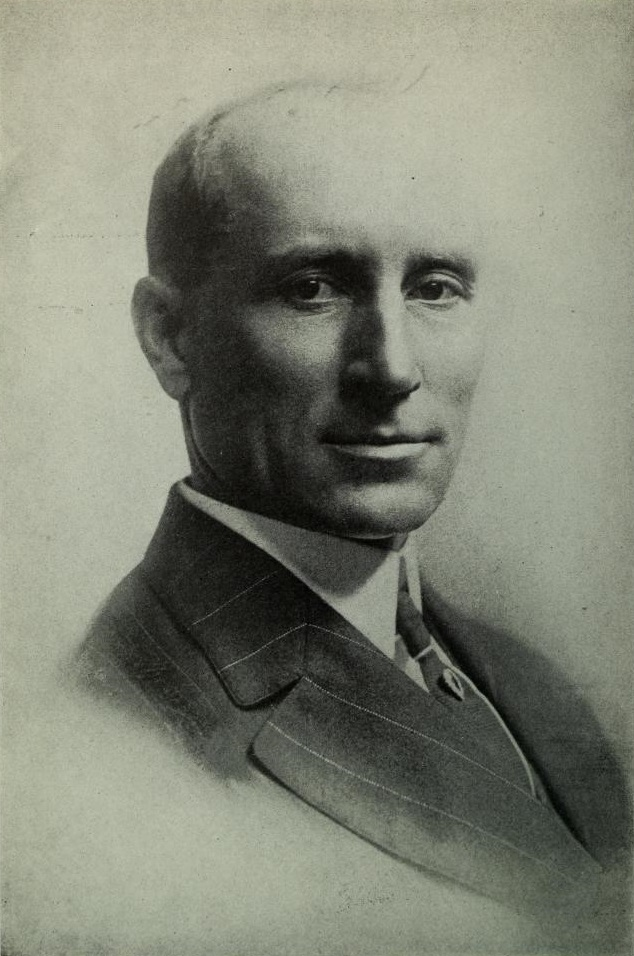
Nominee	Charles Curtis	George H. Hodges
Party	Republican	Democratic
Popular vote	327,072	170,443
Percentage	64.01%	33.36%
- County results Curtis: 40–50% 50–60% 60–70% 70–80%
[[List of United States senators from {{{country}}}|U.S. senator]] before election
Charles Curtis
Republican
Elected U.S. Senator
Charles Curtis
Republican

The 1920 United States Senate election in Kansas was held on November 2, 1920. Incumbent Republican Senator Charles Curtis ran for re-election to his second consecutive term, and his third term overall. He was challenged by former Governor George H. Hodges, the Democratic nominee, and defeated him in a landslide as Republican presidential nominee Warren G. Harding won the state by a similar margin.

== Democratic primary ==
=== Candidates ===
- George H. Hodges, former Governor of Kansas

=== Results ===
Democratic primary results
Party	Candidate	Votes	%
Democratic	George H. Hodges	35,834	100.00%
Total votes		35,834	100.00%

== Republican primary ==
=== Candidates ===
- Charles Curtis, incumbent U.S. Senator
- John A. Edwards, former State Representative

=== Results ===
Republican primary results
Party	Candidate	Votes	%
Republican	Charles Curtis (inc.)	106,146	67.91%
Republican	John A. Edwards	50,155	32.09%
Total votes		156,301	100.00%

== Socialist primary ==
=== Candidates ===
- Eva Harding, physician

=== Results ===
Socialist primary results
Party	Candidate	Votes	%
Socialist	Eva Harding	746	100.00%
Total votes		746	100.00%

Prior to the primary, Harding passed away. The Kansas Socialist Party subsequently named Dan Beedy as its replacement nominee.

== General election ==
=== Results ===
1920 United States Senate election in Kansas
Party	Candidate	Votes	%	±%
Republican	Charles Curtis (inc.)	327,072	64.01%	+28.48%
Democratic	George H. Hodges	170,443	33.36%	−1.41%
Socialist	Dan Beedy	13,417	2.63%	−2.19%
Write-in		1	0.00%	—
Majority		156,629	30.66%	+29.89%
Total votes		510,933	100.00%	
Republican hold				

== See also ==
- 1920 United States Senate elections
