= 1906 Kansas gubernatorial election =

- November 6, 1906
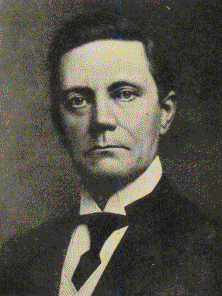

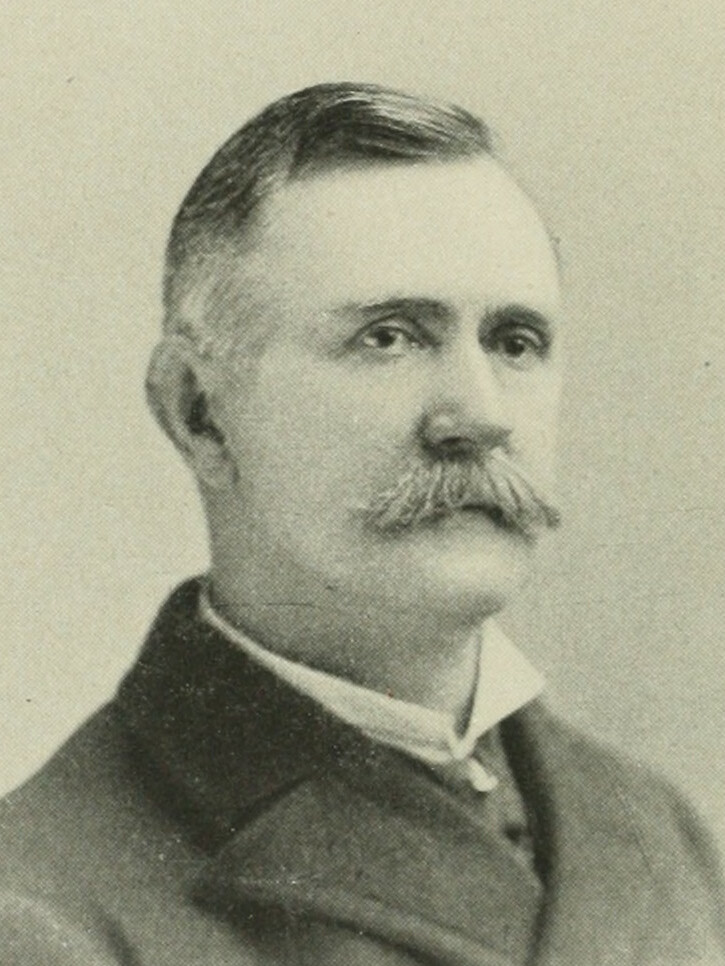
Nominee	Edward W. Hoch	William Alexander Harris
Party	Republican	Democratic
Popular vote	152,147	150,024
Percentage	48.24%	47.57%
- County results Hoch: 40–50% 50–60% 60–70% Harris: 40–50% 50–60% 60–70% 70–80%
Governor before election
Edward W. Hoch
Republican
Elected Governor
Edward W. Hoch
Republican

The 1906 Kansas gubernatorial election was held on November 6, 1906. Incumbent Republican Edward W. Hoch defeated Democratic nominee William Alexander Harris with 48.24% of the vote.

== General election ==
=== Candidates ===
Major party candidates

- Edward W. Hoch, Republican
- William Alexander Harris, Democratic

Other candidates

- J. B. Cook, Prohibition
- Harry Gilham, Socialist
- Horace A. Keefer, People's

=== Results ===
1906 Kansas gubernatorial election
Party	Candidate	Votes	%	±%
Republican	Edward W. Hoch (incumbent)	152,147	48.24%	
Democratic	William Alexander Harris	150,024	47.57%	
Prohibition	J. B. Cook	7,621	2.42%	
Socialist	Harry Gilham	4,453	1.41%	
Populist	Horace A. Keefer	1,131	0.36%	
Majority		2,123		
Turnout				
Republican hold		Swing		
