= 1914 Kansas gubernatorial election =

- November 3, 1914
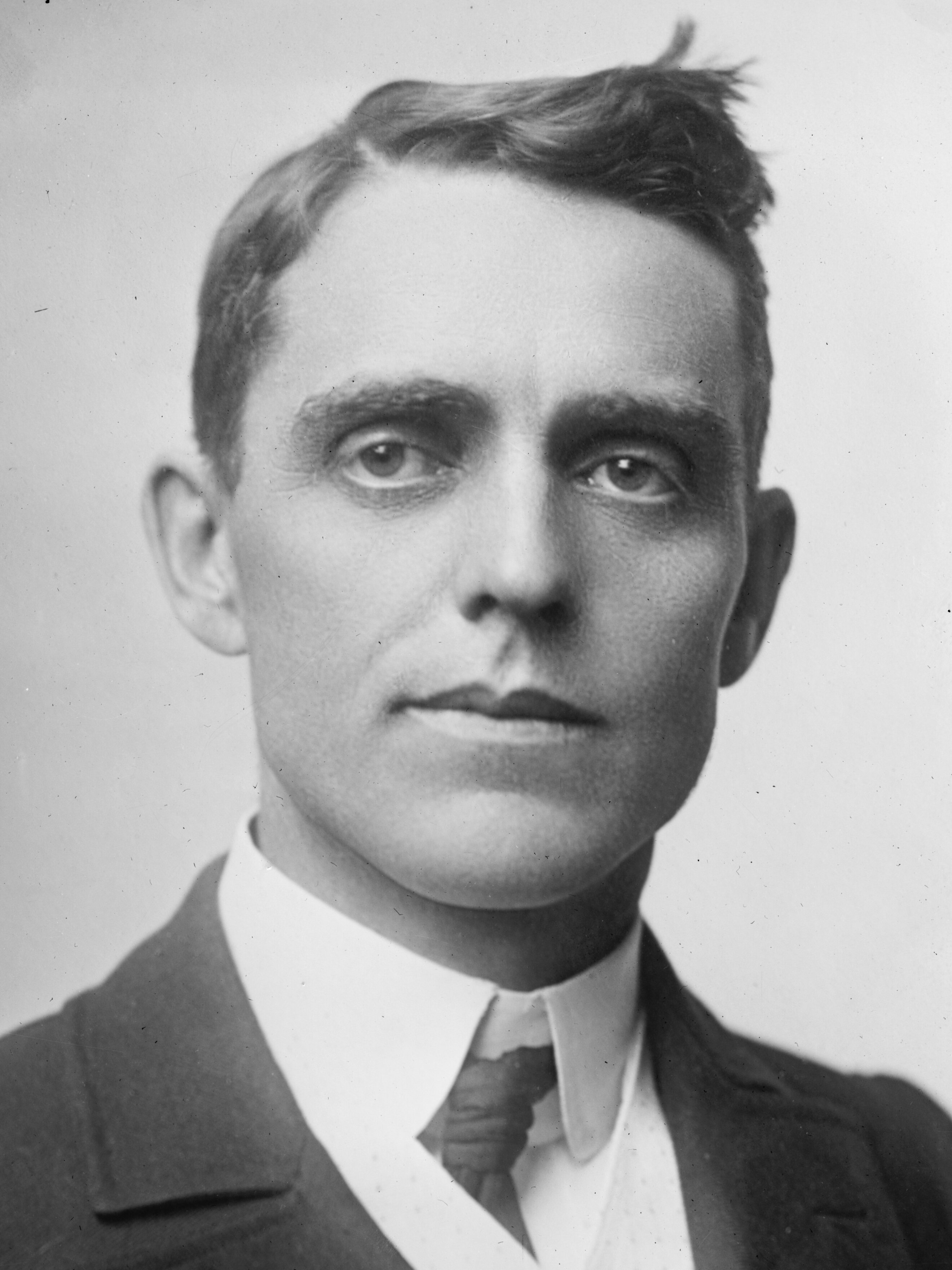

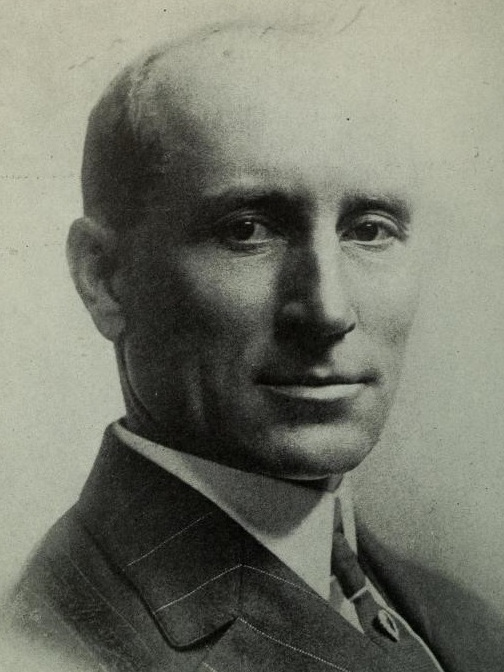

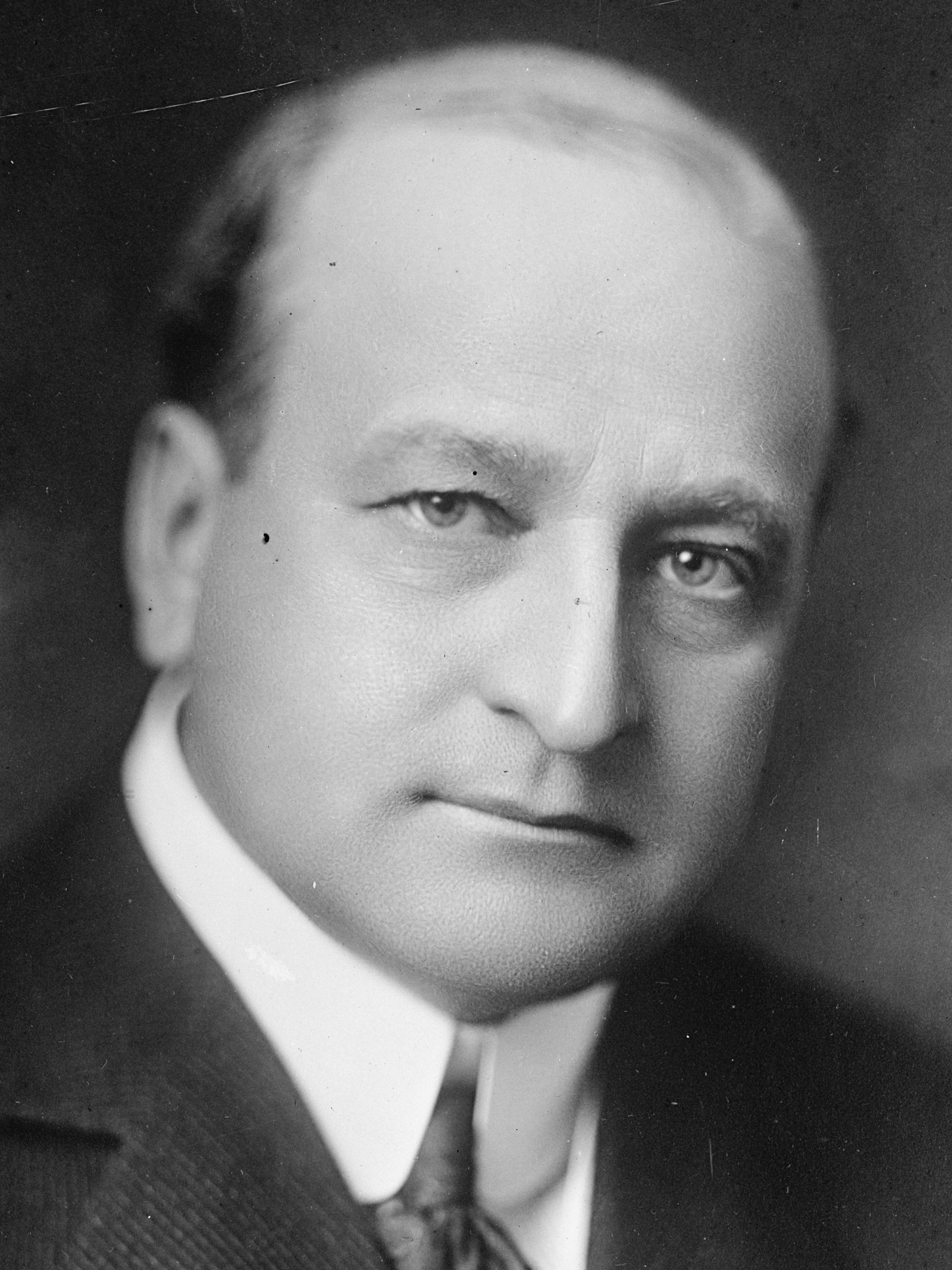

Nominee	Arthur Capper	George H. Hodges
Party	Republican	Democratic
Popular vote	209,543	161,696
Percentage	39.67%	30.61%
Nominee	Henry Justin Allen	Julius B. Billard
Party	Progressive	Independent
Popular vote	84,060	47,201
Percentage	15.91%	8.94%
- County results Capper: 30–40% 40–50% 50–60% 60–70% Hodges: 30–40% 40–50% Allen: 20–30% Billard: 40–50%
Governor before election
George H. Hodges
Democratic
Elected Governor
Arthur Capper
Republican

The 1914 Kansas gubernatorial election was held on November 3, 1914. Republican nominee Arthur Capper defeated Democratic incumbent George H. Hodges with 39.67% of the vote.

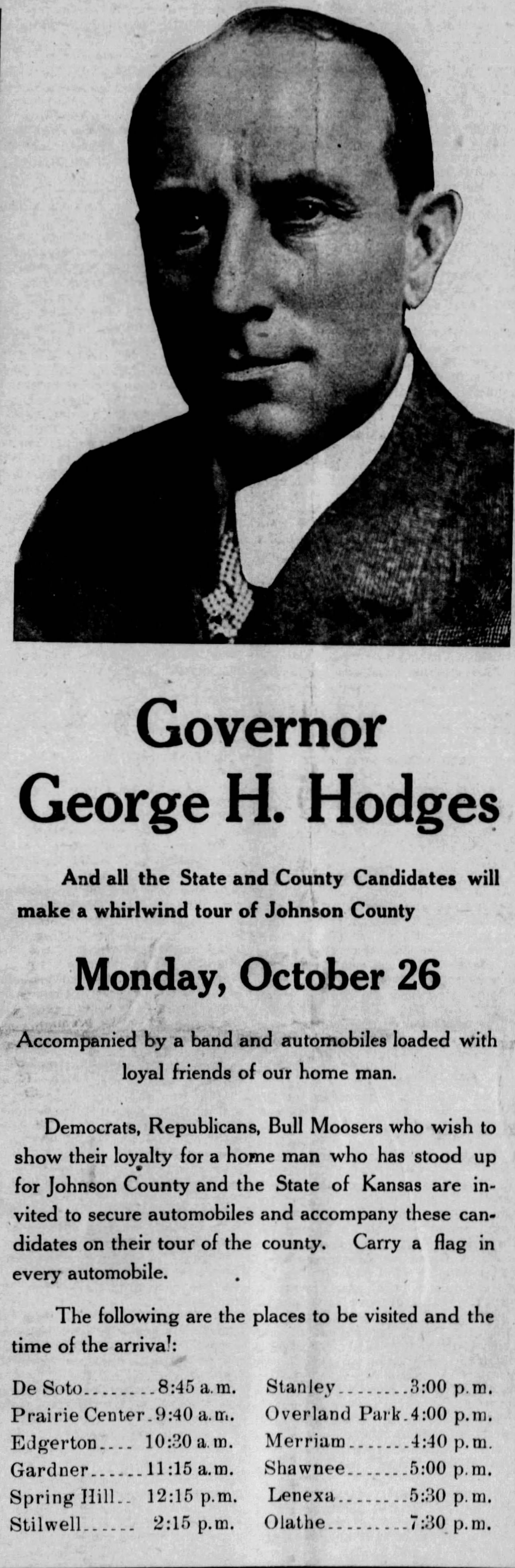
George H. Hodges' 1914 Kansas gubernatorial campaign

== General election ==
=== Candidates ===
Major party candidates

- Arthur Capper, Republican
- George H. Hodges, Democratic

Other candidates

- Henry Justin Allen, Progressive
- Julius B. Billard, Independent
- Milo M. Mitchell, Socialist
- Silas W. Bond, Prohibition

=== Results ===
1914 Kansas gubernatorial election
Party	Candidate	Votes	%	±%
Republican	Arthur Capper	209,543	39.67%	
Democratic	George H. Hodges (incumbent)	161,696	30.61%	
Progressive	Henry Justin Allen	84,060	15.91%	
Independent	Julius B. Billard	47,201	8.94%	
Socialist	Milo M. Mitchell	20,360	3.86%	
Prohibition	Silas W. Bond	5,346	1.01%	
Majority		47,847		
Turnout				
Republican gain from Democratic		Swing		
