= William H. Thompson (Kansas politician) =

American politician (1871–1928)

United States Senator from Kansas
- In office March 4, 1913 – March 3, 1919
- Preceded by: Charles Curtis
- Succeeded by: Arthur Capper

Personal details
- Born: October 14, 1871 Crawfordsville, Indiana, US
- Died: February 9, 1928 (aged 56) Washington, D.C., US
- Resting place: Mount Hope Cemetery Topeka, Kansas, US
- Party: Democratic
- Spouse: Bertha Felt (m. 1894)

William Howard Thompson (October 14, 1871 - February 9, 1928) was an attorney, judge, and politician who served as a United States senator from Kansas from 1913 to 1919. A Democrat from a heavily Republican state, Thompson was a national leader in the Prohibition and women's suffrage movements, and supported many of the progressive reforms put forth by President Woodrow Wilson while maintaining a reputation for independence from his party.

He holds the ignominious distinction of suffering the worst re-election defeat of any incumbent U.S. Senator in history, losing to popular Republican governor Arthur Capper by 30 percentage points in 1918. Thompson is one of only four Democrats ever sent to the U.S. Senate from Kansas, along with John Martin, George McGill, and Adam Hamilton.

== Early life and career ==
Born in Crawfordsville, Indiana, he moved with his parents to Nemaha County, Kansas in 1880, where attended the public schools and graduated from the Seneca Normal School in 1886. He graduated from the Lawrence Business College in 1891 and began studying law under his father, John Franklin Thompson, a Union Civil War veteran, attorney, and judge. The younger Thompson was the official court reporter of the twenty-second judicial district of Kansas from 1891 to 1894 before gaining admission to the bar, joining his father's practice in Seneca. He was appointed clerk of the Kansas Court of Appeals in Topeka in 1897, moving to Iola, Kansas in 1901 when his term expired.

== Political career ==
Thompson's first elected office was as county attorney of Allen County, before moving to Garden City in 1905. One year later, he was elected judge of the thirty-second judicial district, the first Democrat ever elected to the heavily Republican seat, earning reelection in 1910.

== U.S. Senate ==
While in the Senate, he was chairman of the Committee on Expenditures in the Departments of Commerce and Labor (Sixty-third Congress) and a member of the Committee on Expenditures in the Department of Commerce (Sixty-third and Sixty-fourth Congresses) and the Committee to Audit and Control the Contingent Expenses (Sixty-fifth Congress).

On a tour of American lines during the Battle of Soissons in France in summer 1918, Thompson garnered press coverage for firing a French 75 cannon at the retreating German army. He badly burned his hand picking up a spent shell as a souvenir.

== Later life and death ==
Thompson resumed the practice of law at Kansas City, Kansas in 1919 and moved to Tulsa, Oklahoma in 1923, and practiced law in Kansas City and Tulsa. He moved to Washington, D.C., in 1927, where he continued the practice of law, and died there in 1928, aged 56. He was interred temporarily in Glenwood cemetery in Washington, DC; in May 1928 his remains were transferred to Mount Hope cemetery in Topeka, Kansas.

== Personal life ==
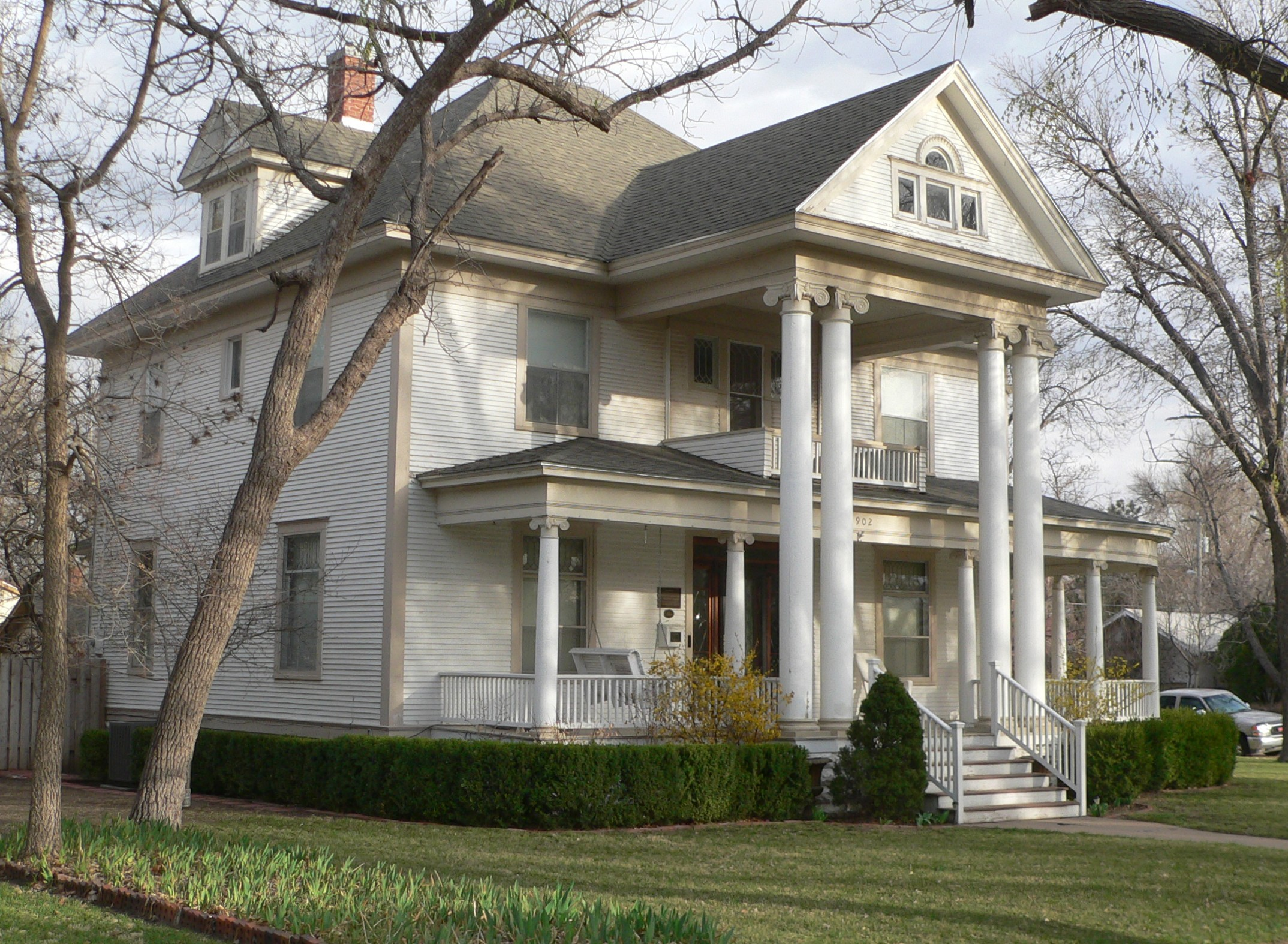
Thompson's residence at 902 N. 6th St. in Garden City.

Thompson was married to Bertha Felt, daughter of former Kansas Lieutenant Governor A.J. Felt, just two months after she graduated high school on August 29, 1894. The Thompsons had three children together: Thelma Bertha, Wilbur Felt, and William Howard Jr.

Thompson was active in fraternal organizations, including the Masonic affiliates of Knights Templar and Shriners, as well as the Benevolent and Protective Order of Elks.

His Garden City residence, constructed in 1907, was listed on the National Register of Historic Places as the Sen. William H. Thompson House in 1996.

== Electoral history ==
=== Senator of Kansas ===
1912 United States Senate election in Kansas
Party	Candidate	Votes	%
Democratic	William Howard Thompson	172,601	49.34%
Republican	W. R. Stubbs	151,647	43.35%
Socialist	Allan W. Ricker	25,610	7.32%
Total votes		349,858	100.0%
Democratic gain from Republican			

1918 United States Senate election in Kansas
Party	Candidate	Votes	%
Republican	Arthur Capper	281,931	63.69%
Democratic	William Howard Thompson	149,300	33.73%
Socialist	Eva Harding	11,429	2.58%
Total votes		442,660	100.0%
Republican gain from Democratic			

Party political offices
First	Democratic nominee for U.S. Senator from Kansas (Class 2); 1913, 1918	Succeeded by James Malone
U.S. Senate
Preceded by Charles Curtis	U.S. senator from Kansas; 1913–1919	Succeeded by Arthur Capper
