= 1904 Kansas gubernatorial election =

- November 8, 1904
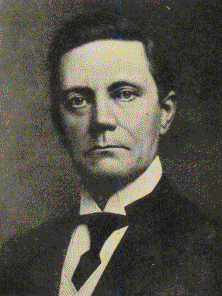

Nominee	Edward W. Hoch	David M. Dale
Party	Republican	Democratic
Popular vote	186,731	116,991
Percentage	57.92%	36.29%
- County results Hoch: 40–50% 50–60% 60–70% 70–80% 80–90% Dale: 40–50% 50–60%
Governor before election
Willis J. Bailey
Republican
Elected Governor
Edward W. Hoch
Republican

The 1904 Kansas gubernatorial election was held on November 8, 1904. Republican nominee Edward W. Hoch defeated Democratic nominee David M. Dale with 57.92% of the vote.

== General election ==
=== Candidates ===
Major party candidates

- Edward W. Hoch, Republican
- David M. Dale, Democratic

Other candidates

- Granville Lowther, Socialist
- James Kerr, Prohibition

=== Results ===
1904 Kansas gubernatorial election
Party	Candidate	Votes	%	±%
Republican	Edward W. Hoch	186,731	57.92%	
Democratic	David M. Dale	116,991	36.29%	
Socialist	Granville Lowther	12,101	3.75%	
Prohibition	James Kerr	6,584	2.04%	
Majority		69,740		
Turnout				
Republican hold		Swing		
