= Sen. William H. Thompson House =

Historic house in Kansas, United States

- U.S. National Register of Historic Places
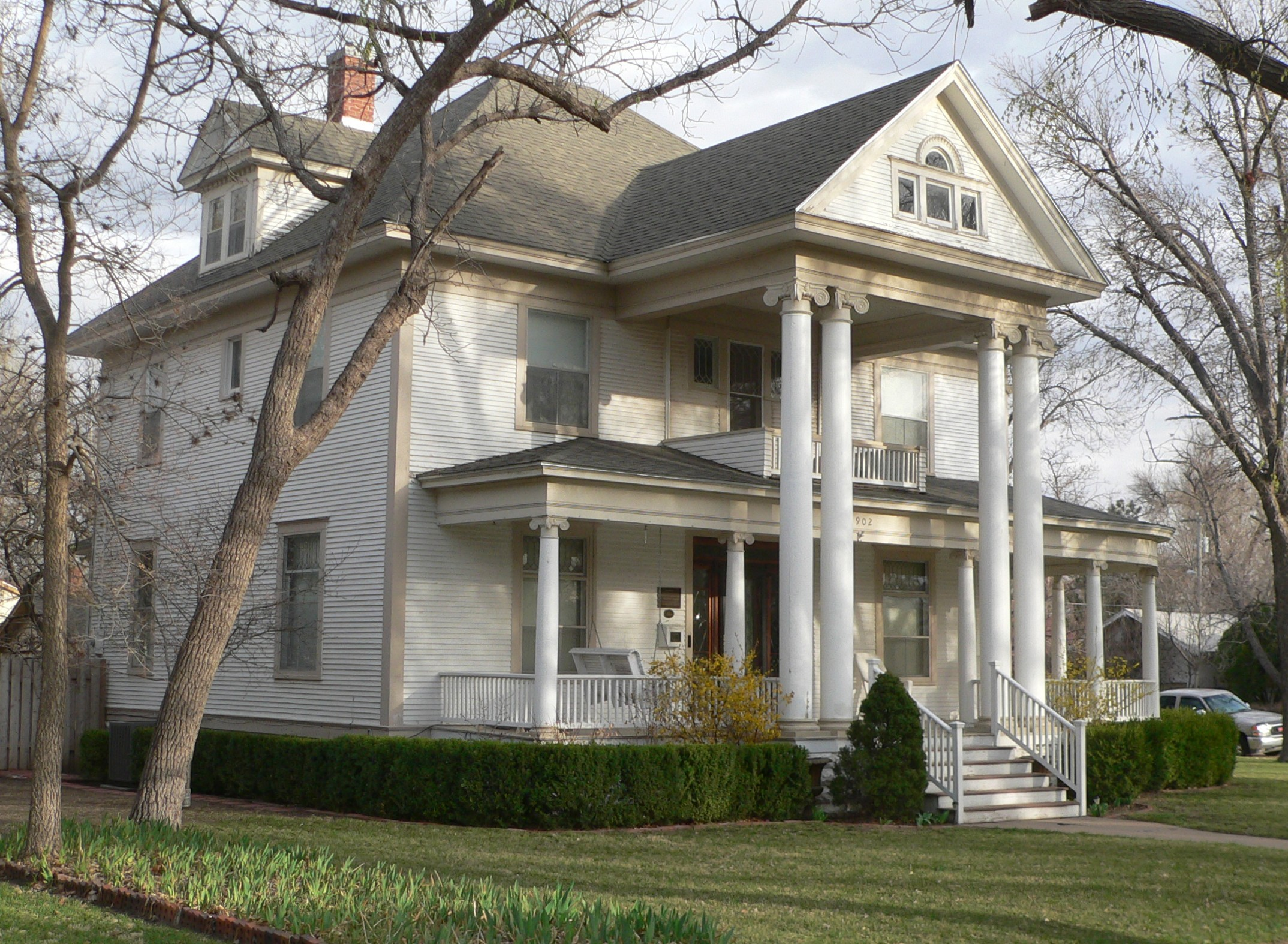

- Location within Kansas Location within the United States
- Location: 902 N. 6th St., Garden City, Kansas
- Coordinates: 37°58′20″N 100°52′9″W
- Area: less than one acre
- Built: c.1907
- Built by: Garloch, J.D.
- Architectural style: Classical Revival
- NRHP reference No.: 96000037
- Added to NRHP: February 16, 1996

The Sen. William H. Thompson House, at 902 N. 6th St. in Garden City, Kansas, was built in 1907. It was listed on the National Register of Historic Places in 1996.

It was the home of U.S. Senator William H. Thompson from 1907 to 1919.

It is a three-story Classical Revival-style house on a high cement stone block foundation. It is 38 by 32 feet (11.6 m × 9.8 m) in plan.
