= 1910 Kansas gubernatorial election =

- November 8, 1910
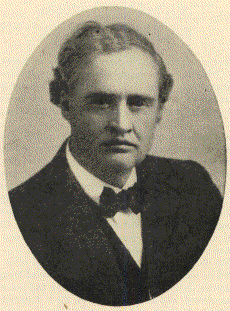

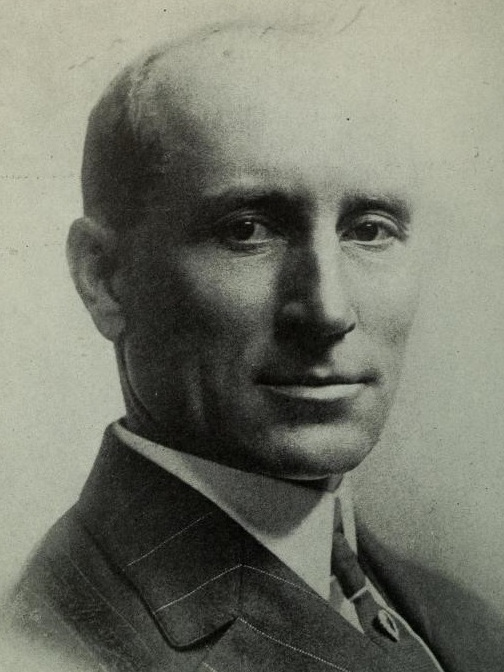
Nominee	Walter R. Stubbs	George H. Hodges
Party	Republican	Democratic
Popular vote	162,181	146,014
Percentage	49.76%	44.80%
- County results Stubbs: 40–50% 50–60% 60–70% 80–90% Hodges: 40–50% 50–60% 60–70%
Governor before election
Walter R. Stubbs
Republican
Elected Governor
Walter R. Stubbs
Republican

The 1910 Kansas gubernatorial election was held on November 8, 1910. Incumbent Republican Walter R. Stubbs defeated Democratic nominee George H. Hodges with 49.76% of the vote.

== General election ==
=== Candidates ===
Major party candidates

- Walter R. Stubbs, Republican
- George H. Hodges, Democratic

Other candidates

- S. M. Stallard, Socialist
- William C. Cady, Prohibition

=== Results ===
1910 Kansas gubernatorial election
Party	Candidate	Votes	%	±%
Republican	Walter R. Stubbs (incumbent)	162,181	49.76%	
Democratic	George H. Hodges	146,014	44.80%	
Socialist	S. M. Stallard	15,384	4.72%	
Prohibition	William C. Cady	2,373	0.73%	
Majority		16,167		
Turnout				
Republican hold		Swing		
