= William A. Harris (Kansas politician) =

American politician

William Alexander Harris
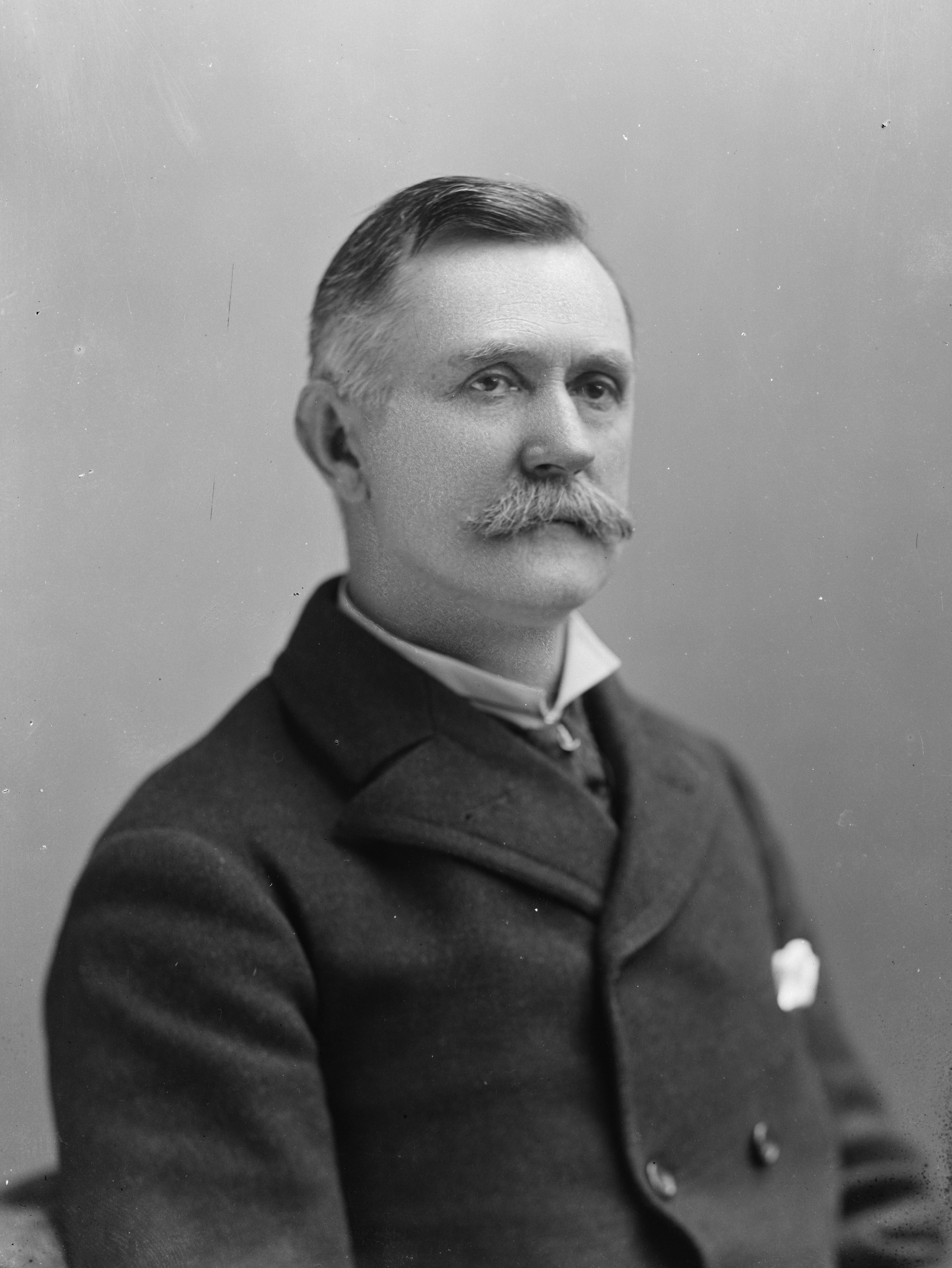
- Portrait by C. M. Bell c. 1894–1895

United States Senator from Kansas
- In office March 4, 1897 – March 4, 1903
- Preceded by: William A. Peffer
- Succeeded by: Chester I. Long

Member of the U.S. House of Representatives from Kansas's at-large district
- In office March 4, 1893 – March 4, 1895
- Preceded by: Lewis Hanback
- Succeeded by: Richard W. Blue

Member of the Kansas Senate
- In office 1895–1896

Personal details
- Born: October 29, 1841 Luray, Virginia
- Died: December 20, 1909 (aged 68) Chicago, Illinois
- Party: Populist

Military service
- Allegiance: Confederate States of America
- Branch/service: Confederate States Army
- Years of service: 1861–1863
- Rank: Captain
- Battles/wars: American Civil War; Battle of Gettysburg

William Alexander Harris (October 29, 1841 – December 20, 1909) was a United States representative and Senator from Kansas.

== Early life and education ==
A son of U.S. Congressman William Alexander Harris (1805–1864), William Alexander Harris Jr. was born either in Loudoun County, Virginia or Luray, Virginia, while his father was serving in Congress. Harris attended the common schools and later attended and graduated from Columbian College (later George Washington University), Washington, D.C., in 1859. A year later, he matriculated as part of the third or sophomore class at the Virginia Military Institute on 16 January 1860. Official records reveal that he matriculated from Page County, though he actually had done so from Pike County, Missouri. In a class composed of future notables such as future commanding officer of the Stuart Horse Artillery, Roger Preston Chew, Harris fared well in class standing, graduating early in December, 1861 as 7 of 35.

== The Civil War years ==
After a brief stint as drillmaster with an artillery company formed in Page County, Harris was assigned to duty with Col. William N. Pendleton and, in the same month (November 1861) transferred as assistant adjutant general on the staff of General Cadmus Wilcox. Promoted to captain in January 1862, Harris resigned from Wilcox's staff in July 1862 and was assigned as a lieutenant and acting ordnance officer in Gen. Daniel Harvey Hill’s division. Promoted to the temporary rank of captain in the spring of 1863, Harris was yet reassigned and named Chief of Ordnance of Gen. Robert E. Rodes’ division. Following the loss at Gettysburg, Harris deserted from the army feeling that further effort was futile. However, some records reveal that he may have had other reasons for leaving the army in that he was denied a transfer to Major Harry W. Gilmor’s cavalry battalion.

== Early life in Kansas ==
In 1865, Harris and his Page County-native bride, Mary Lionberger, moved to Kansas. Shortly thereafter, Harris was employed as a civil engineer in the construction of the Union Pacific Railroad until 1868; that year, he moved to Lawrence, Kansas. He was appointed agent for the railroad companies in the sale of the Delaware Reservation and other lands, and in 1884 moved to Linwood, Leavenworth County and engaged in agricultural pursuits and stock raising.

== Political life ==
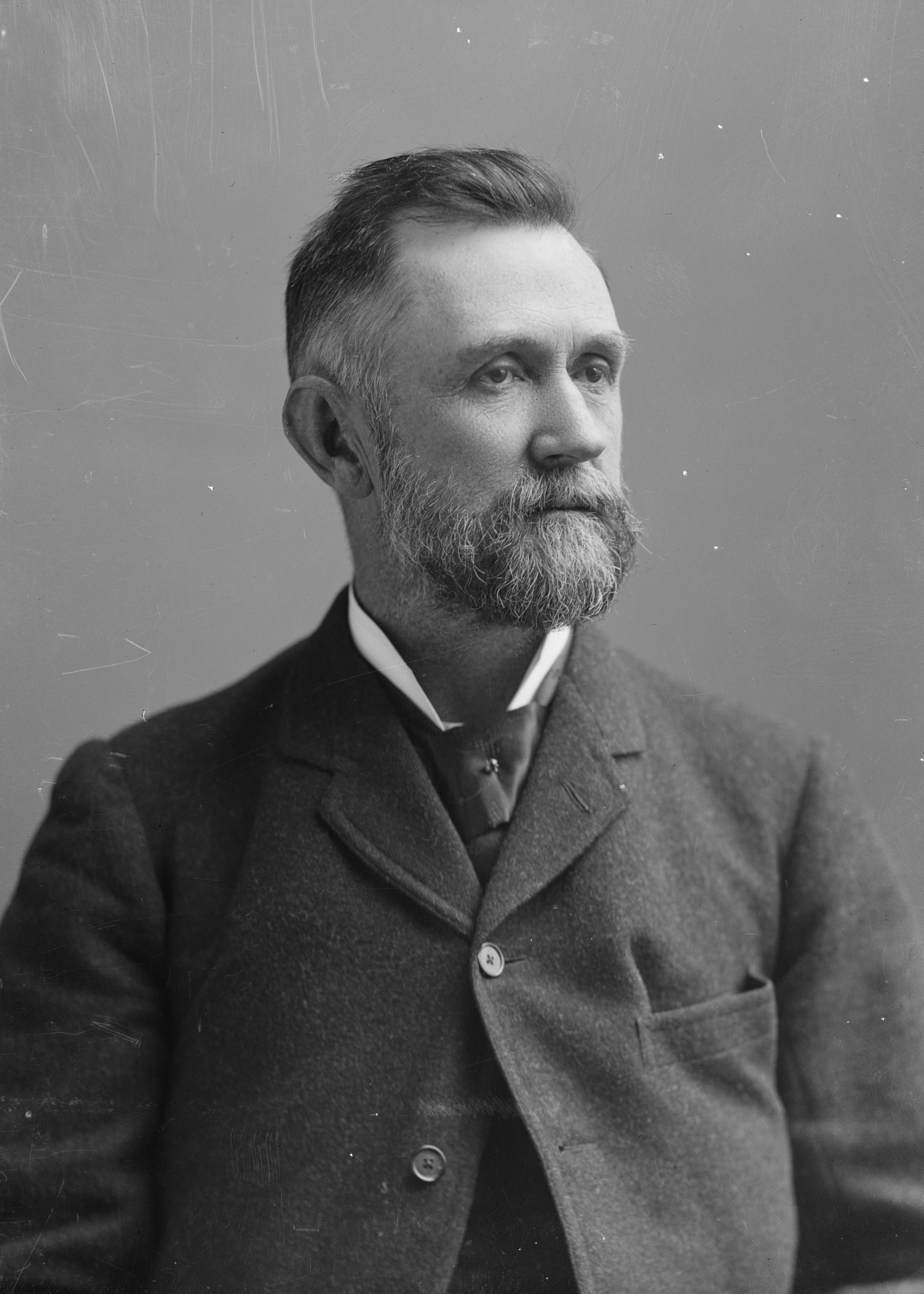
Portrait by C. M. Bell c. 1891–1894

Following in his father's footsteps, Harris eventually sought a life in politics. He was elected as a Populist member to the Fifty-third Congress (March 4, 1893 – March 4, 1895) and was an unsuccessful candidate for reelection in 1894. He was a member of the Kansas Senate in 1895 and 1896, and was elected as a U.S. senator from Kansas (March 4, 1897, to March 4, 1903). He was an unsuccessful candidate for the governorship of Kansas in 1906. Harris is believed to have been the only Confederate veteran ever elected to any office of importance in Kansas.

== Late life and agricultural pursuits ==
Resuming his agricultural interests, Harris was extremely popular in the agriculture circles for his raising shorthorn cattle. Retiring from political life, Harris later became the vice president of the Denver, Laramie & Northwestern Railroad. Harris died in Chicago at the home of his sister, where he had gone to work with the National Livestock Association, in 1909; interment was in Oak Hill Cemetery, Lawrence, Kansas.

== Sources ==
- United States Congress. "William Alexander Harris (id: H000258)". Biographical Directory of the United States Congress.
- Moore, Robert H. II, Short Historical Sketches of Page County, Virginia and Its People, Volume 2 ("The Harris family in Page County"); Heritage Books, Inc., 2005, pp. 193–194.

Party political offices
Preceded by David M. Dale	Democratic nominee for Governor of Kansas; 1906	Succeeded by Jeremiah D. Botkin
U.S. House of Representatives
Preceded by Lewis Hanback	Member of the U.S. House of Representatives from Kansas's at-large congressional district March 4, 1893 – March 3, 1895	Succeeded by Richard W. Blue
U.S. Senate
Preceded by William A. Peffer	U.S. senator (Class 3) from Kansas; 1897–1903; Served alongside: Lucien Baker, Joseph R. Burton	Succeeded by Chester I. Long
