= George H. Hodges =

American politician (1866–1947)

George Hartshorn Hodges
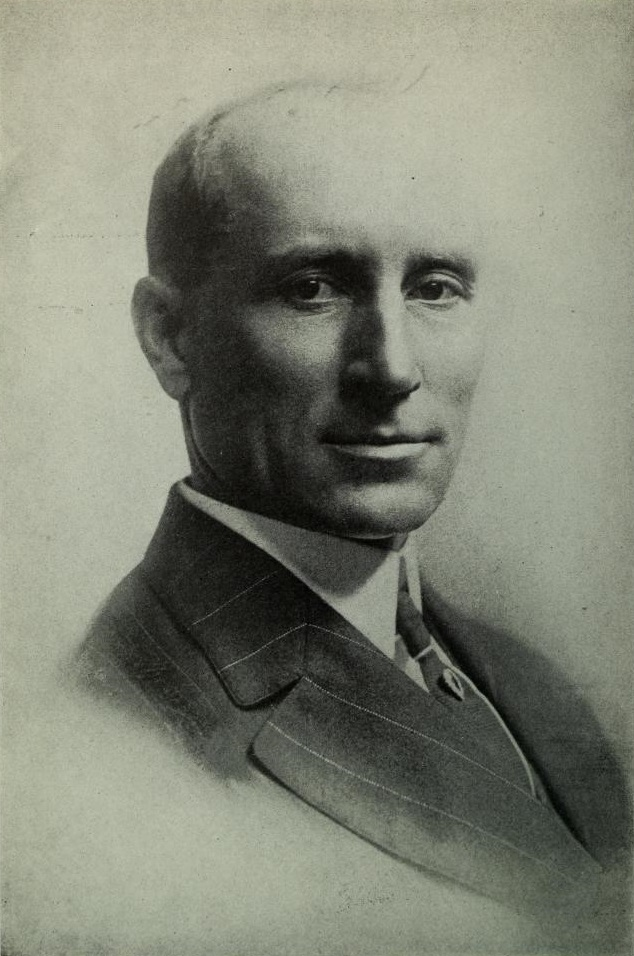

19th Governor of Kansas
- In office January 13, 1913 – January 11, 1915
- Lieutenant: Sheffield Ingalls
- Preceded by: Walter R. Stubbs
- Succeeded by: Arthur Capper

Member of the Kansas Senate
- In office 1905-1913

Personal details
- Born: February 6, 1866 Orion, Wisconsin, US
- Died: October 7, 1947 (aged 81) Kansas City, Missouri, US
- Party: Democratic
- Spouse: Ora May Murray
- Profession: businessman, politician

George Hartshorn Hodges (February 6, 1866 – October 7, 1947) was an American politician and the 19th governor of Kansas (1913–1915).

== Biography ==
Hodges was born in Orion, Wisconsin, in Richland County. His family moved to Olathe, Kansas, when he was three years old. He received his education in the public schools. He married Ora May Murray and they had two children.

== Career ==
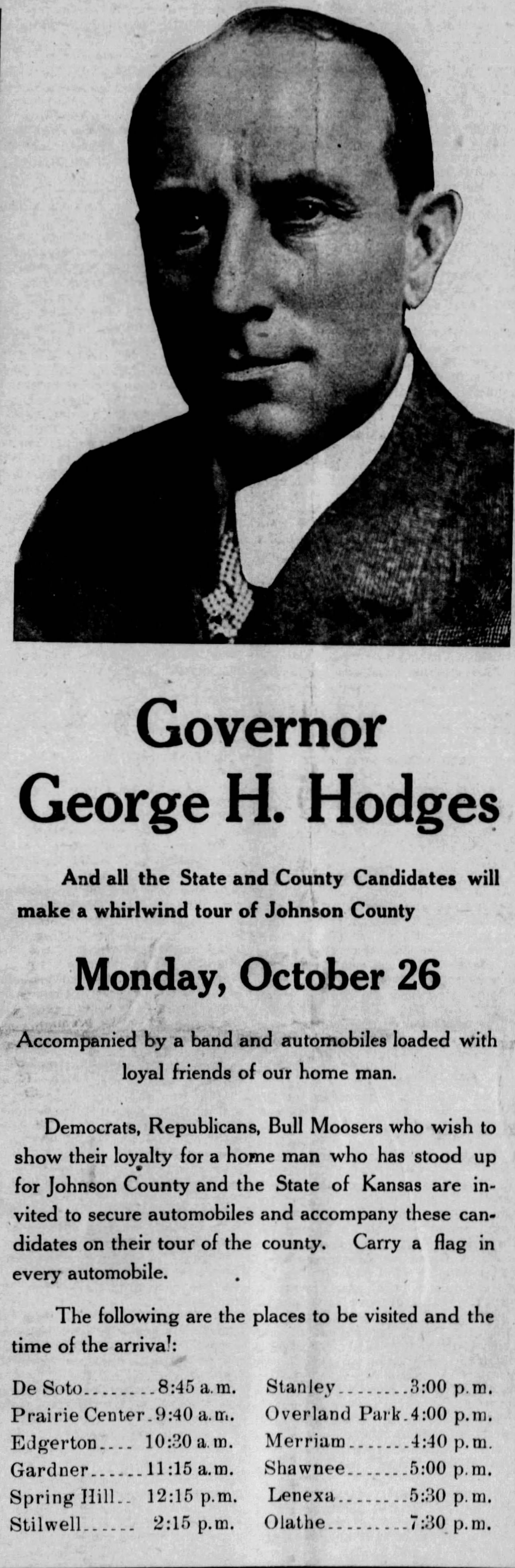
George H. Hodges' 1914 Kansas gubernatorial campaign

Hodges had a successful career as a businessman with holdings in the lumber, hardware, and the loan industries, as well as owning a newspaper, the Johnson County Democrat.

Hodges was elected to the Olathe City Council in 1896, serving alongside his brother, Mayor Frank Hodges. George Hodges was elected to one term as mayor of Olathe after his four year as a city councilman.

Hodges served in the Kansas Senate from 1905 to 1913, where he was particularly active on the railroad committee and known for leading the charge for progressive laws in the state.

He was the unsuccessful Democratic nominee for governor in 1910 and was elected governor in 1912, defeating Republican Arthur Capper by 23 votes in the closest election in Kansas history.

In his January 14, 1913, State of the State Address, Hodges called for equal suffrage for women, the direct election of U.S. Senators, closed primary elections, to allow taxation on mortgages held by non-residents of Kansas on property owned in Kansas, repeal of the inheritance law, expansion of the state's mileage of permanent dirt roads, an overhaul of the state's grain inspection law, new child labor laws, new employment safety laws, a review of proposals for the state to publish school textbooks, the reduction of contingency funds for statewide officeholders excluding the state attorney general, giving the state new powers over river beds, the merger of the state livestock sanitary commissioner into Kansas State University and an elected state labor commissioner with additional powers.

Hodges also used his inaugural address to call for four amendments to the state constitution:

- Permitting statewide initiative and referendum
- Permitting recall of elected officials
- Expanding statewide and county officials terms from two years to four years
- State aid for road and bridge construction

The administration of Governor Hodges brought the following changes:

- a corporation tax was sanctioned
- a women's suffrage amendment to the state constitution was authorized
- the board of administration was granted power to control all state agencies
- Control of all state schools was placed under the State Board of Education
- Repeal of the inheritance tax
- New power for the Kansas Bureau of Labor
- Allowed for the state publication of school textbooks
- New miner safety laws
- Created a hospital for patients with tuberculous
- Placed public hospitals under the control of county governments
- Created the office of prison matron for women's county jails
- Created the office of divorce proctor
- women's roles were advanced in state government.

On March 10, 1913, he delivered a speech to the Kansas Legislature calling for an overhaul of the Legislature by combining the Kansas House of Representatives and Kansas Senate into a single Legislative Assembly, consisting of one or two members from each congressional district with the governor serving as the presiding officer. He said the size of the Legislature was too large for the state.

Hodges also proposed moving the state from having legislative sessions in odd number years to holding annual legislative sessions, suggesting the biennium procedure caused legislators to rush through their business and not have ample time to study legislation.

Hodges is to date the only governor of Kansas to serve with a Democratic legislature. After losing his reelection bid, Hodges returned to his various business interests as he had established a successful career as a businessman. He was a member of the State Board of Regents from 1925 to 1927. He also served on the State Textbook Commission.

Party political offices
Preceded by Jeremiah D. Botkin	Democratic nominee for Governor of Kansas; 1910, 1912, 1914	Succeeded by W. C. Lansdon
Preceded by George A. Neeley	Democratic nominee for U.S. Senator from Kansas (Class 3); 1920	Succeeded by Charles Stephens
Political offices
Preceded by Walter R. Stubbs	Governor of Kansas; 1913–1915	Succeeded by Arthur Capper
