= Richard W. Blue =

American politician

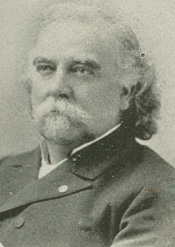

Member of the U.S. House of Representatives from Kansas's at-large district
- In office March 4, 1895 – March 3, 1897
- Preceded by: William A. Harris
- Succeeded by: Jeremiah D. Botkin

Member of the Kansas Senate
- In office 1880-1888

Personal details
- Born: September 8, 1841 near Parkersburg, Virginia
- Died: January 28, 1907 (aged 65) Bartlesville, Oklahoma
- Party: Republican Party
- Education: Monongalia Academy; Washington College

Richard Whiting Blue (September 8, 1841 – January 28, 1907) was a farmer, teacher, lawyer, judge, state senator, and U.S. Representative. He served in the Union Army during the American Civil War. He lived in Virginia and then Kansas.

Born near Parkersburg, Virginia (now West Virginia), Blue worked on a farm in the summertime and studied in the select schools of that locality during the winter season. He attended Monongalia Academy, Morgantown, Virginia, in 1859 and Washington (Pennsylvania) College until his enlistment, on June 29, 1863, as a private in Company A of the 3rd West Virginia Infantry Regiment, during the Civil War. He became second and then first lieutenant of the company. Honorably discharged May 22, 1866, at Leavenworth, Kansas, when he returned to Grafton, West Virginia. He taught school. He studied law. He was admitted to the bar in Virginia, and commenced practice in Linn County, Kansas, in 1871. Probate judge of Linn County 1872–1876. County attorney 1876–1880. He served as member of the State senate 1880–1888.

Blue was elected as a Republican to the Fifty-fourth Congress (March 4, 1895 – March 3, 1897). He was an unsuccessful candidate for reelection in 1896 to the Fifty-fifth Congress. He engaged in the practice of law until his death in Bartlesville, Washington County, Oklahoma, January 28, 1907. He was interred in Pleasanton Cemetery, Pleasanton, Kansas.

U.S. House of Representatives
Preceded by William A. Harris	Member of the U.S. House of Representatives from Kansas's at-large congressional district March 4, 1895 – March 3, 1897	Succeeded by Jeremiah D. Botkin
