= Sheffield Ingalls =

American politician

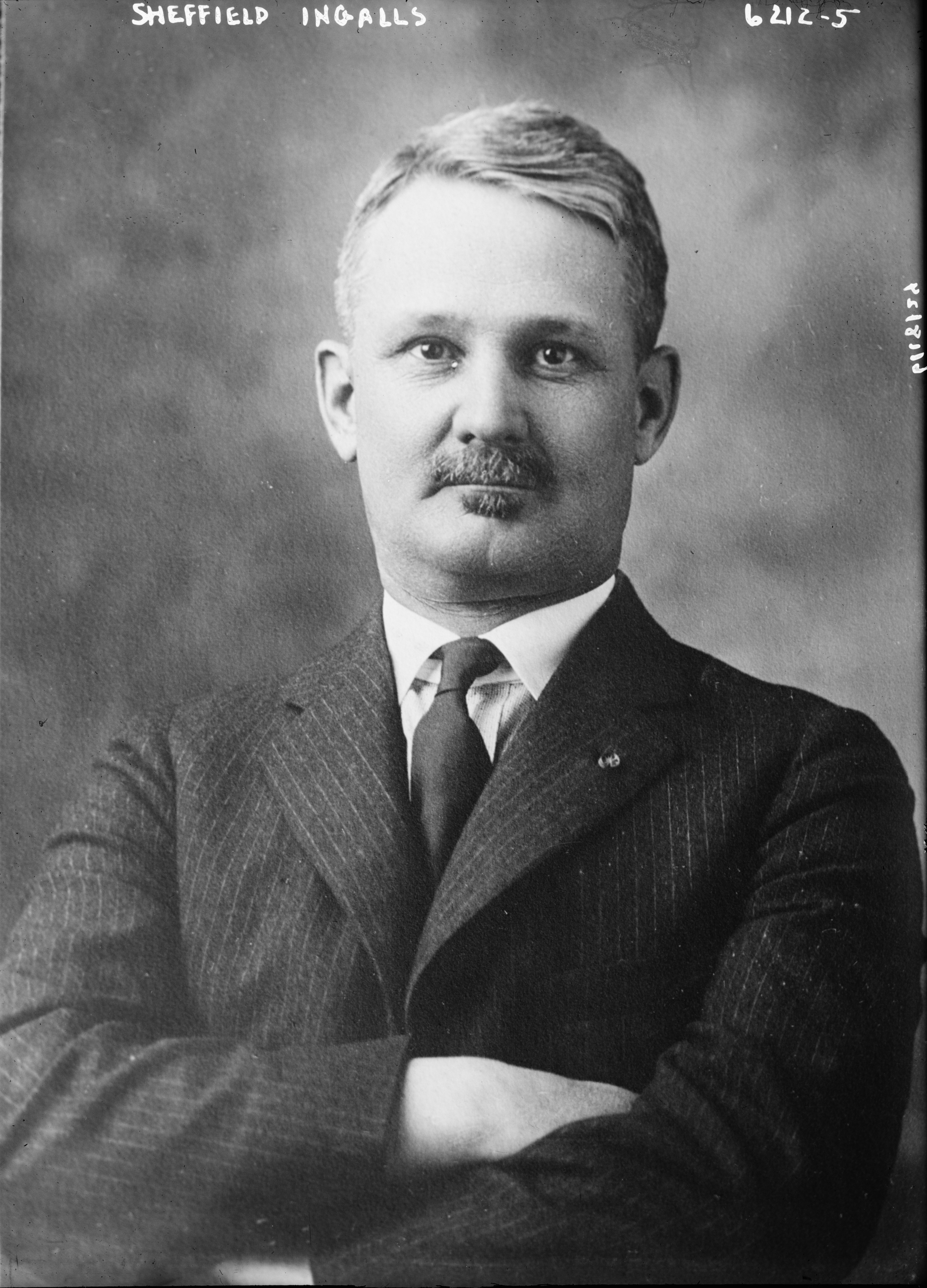
Sheffield Ingalls

Sheffield Ingalls (March 28, 1875 – January 17, 1937) was a banker, attorney and Republican politician in the state of Kansas. He served as the 20th Lieutenant Governor of Kansas from 1913 to 1915 serving under Governor George H. Hodges. Outside politics he was a successful investor and banker in Atchison, Kansas. He served in the Kansas House of Representatives. His father John James Ingalls was also a Kansas legislator.

He was a graduate of the University of Kansas in the class of 1895 and served as chairman of the Alumni association from 1905 to 1906 and again from 1928 to 1929. In 1916, he published a book titled The History of Atchison, Kansas.

Ingalls died in 1937, he was buried in Mount Vernon Cemetery in Atchison, Kansas.

Political offices
Preceded by Richard Joseph Hopkins	Lieutenant Governor of Kansas; 1913–1915	Succeeded by William Yoast Morgan
