= Edward W. Hoch =

American newspaper editor and politician (1849–1925)

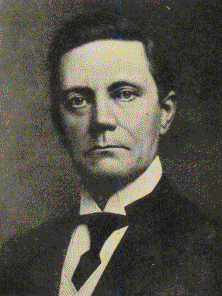

17th Governor of Kansas
- In office January 9, 1905 – January 11, 1909
- Lieutenant: David John Hanna; William James Fitzgerald
- Preceded by: Willis J. Bailey
- Succeeded by: Walter R. Stubbs

Member of the Kansas House of Representatives
- In office 1889-1891; 1893-1895

Personal details
- Born: March 17, 1849 Danville, Kentucky
- Died: June 1, 1925 (aged 76) Marion, Kansas
- Party: Republican
- Spouse: Sarah Louisa Dickerson
- Profession: Printer, Newspaper editor

Edward Wallis Hoch (March 17, 1849 – June 1, 1925) was an American newspaper editor, politician and the 17th governor of Kansas. Hoch Auditoria at the University of Kansas was named after him.

== Biography ==
Hoch was born in Danville, Kentucky. His education was in the public schools and he attended Central University in Danville. He left college before graduating, entered a newspaper office and spent three years learning to be a printer.

Hoch moved to Marion, Kansas, in 1871, and homesteaded 160 acres of land. He bought the Marion County Record newspaper in 1874 and became a country editor. He married Sarah Louise Dickerson on May 23, 1876, and they had four children, two sons and two daughters.

== Career ==
Hoch was elected and served two terms in the Kansas House of Representatives (1889–91 and 1893–95). With the support of Kansas like Charles Curtis, M.A. Low, and J.S. Dean, he was elected governor in 1904 and reelected in 1906. During his tenure, new laws enacted included a child labor law, a pure food law, a bank guaranty law, a party primary law, a maximum freight rate bill; and improvements were sanctioned in the juvenile courts and state institutions.

After leaving office, Hoch lectured on the Chautauqua circuit, becoming a well-known orator. He served on the Kansas Board of Administration from 1913 to 1919, and continued as publisher of the Marion Record until his death in Marion on June 1, 1925.

Party political offices
Preceded by Willis J. Bailey	Republican nominee for Governor of Kansas; 1904, 1906	Succeeded by Walter R. Stubbs
Political offices
Preceded by Willis J. Bailey	Governor of Kansas; 1905–1909	Succeeded by Walter R. Stubbs
