= Jeremiah D. Botkin =

American politician

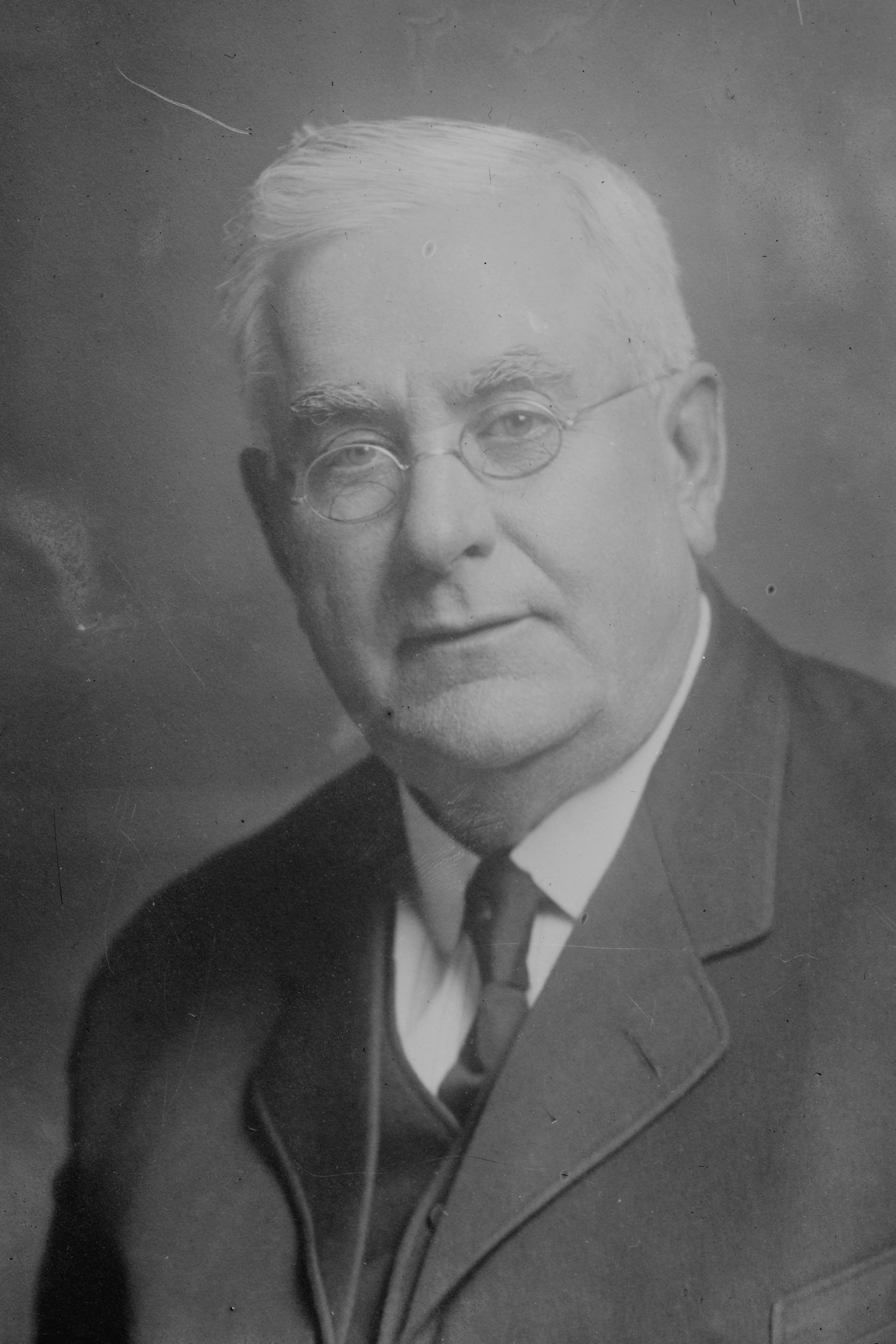

Member of the U.S. House of Representatives from Kansas's at-large district
- In office March 4, 1897 – March 3, 1899
- Preceded by: Richard W. Blue
- Succeeded by: Willis J. Bailey

Personal details
- Born: April 24, 1849 Atlanta, Illinois, US
- Died: December 29, 1921 (aged 72) Liberal, Kansas, US
- Party: Democratic

Jeremiah Dunham Botkin (April 24, 1849 – December 29, 1921) was a U.S. representative from Kansas.

Born near Atlanta, Illinois, Botkin attended the country schools. Spent one year at De Pauw University in Greencastle, Indiana. He pursued theological studies, and entered the Methodist ministry in 1870. He was an unsuccessful Prohibition candidate for Governor of Kansas in 1888. He was an unsuccessful candidate for election in 1894 to the Fifty-fourth Congress. Chaplain of the Kansas Senate in 1897.

Botkin was elected as a Populist to the Fifty-fifth Congress (March 4, 1897 – March 3, 1899). He was an unsuccessful candidate for reelection in 1898 to the Fifty-sixth Congress. He resumed ministerial duties. He was an unsuccessful candidate for governor in 1908. Warden of the State penitentiary, Lansing, Kansas from 1913 to 1915. He again resumed his ministerial duties. He became a Chautauqua lecturer in 1921. He died in Liberal, Kansas, December 29, 1921.

He was interred in Winfield Cemetery, Winfield, Kansas. He was married three times: Mary Elizabeth Oliver in 1889; Laura Helen Waldo, and Carrie L. Kirkpatrick.

Party political offices
Preceded by William Alexander Harris	Democratic nominee for Governor of Kansas; 1908	Succeeded by George H. Hodges
U.S. House of Representatives
Preceded by Richard W. Blue	Member of the U.S. House of Representatives from Kansas's at-large congressional district March 4, 1897 – March 3, 1899	Succeeded by Willis J. Bailey
