= Walter R. Stubbs =

American politician (1858–1929)

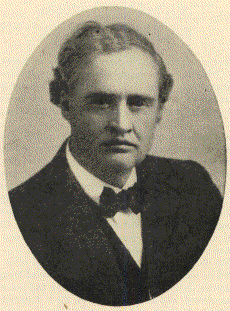

18th Governor of Kansas
- In office January 11, 1909 – January 13, 1913
- Lieutenant: William J. Fitzgerald; Richard Joseph Hopkins
- Preceded by: Edward W. Hoch
- Succeeded by: George H. Hodges

Member of the Kansas House of Representatives
- In office 1903–07

Personal details
- Born: November 7, 1858 Wayne County, Indiana
- Died: March 25, 1929 (aged 70) Topeka, Kansas
- Party: Republican
- Spouse: Stella Hostettler
- Education: University of Kansas (attended)
- Profession: clerk, farmer, mule driver, banker, politician

Walter Roscoe Stubbs (November 7, 1858 – March 25, 1929) was an American businessman who served as the 18th governor of Kansas. Stubbs, a progressive Republican, was known for his prohibitionist beliefs, as well as for having signed the nation's first blue sky law into effect.

== Biography ==
=== Early life ===
Stubbs was born in Wayne County, Indiana, near the city of Richmond, to a family of Quaker heritage. He moved to the small town of Hesper (located about two and a half miles southeast of Eudora) with his family in 1869 and was educated in the Douglas County public school system. For a time, he briefly attended the University of Kansas, but he did not graduate with a degree. He married Stella Hosteller in 1886, and they had five children, one of whom died on the same day that he was born. In his early life, Stubbs held a few odd jobs, such driving mules and being a clerk, before becoming a railroad contractor. After submitting a bid to the Chicago, Rock Island and Pacific Company to build a railroad connecting St. Louis to Kansas City, Stubbs profited around $250,000. His prowess as a contractor continued, and eventually his business was securing contracts totaling around $3–5 million a year.

=== Career ===
During his middle-age, Stubbs decided to enter into politics, and in 1902, he secured a spot in the Kansas House of Representatives, serving the district in which Douglas County was situated. He quickly emerged as the dominant leader of the progressive wing of the Republican Party, and after his re-election in 1904, he became the Speaker of the House, serving from 1905 to 1906. He won a third term in 1906, and served from 1907 until 1909, until he was elected Kansas governor. Stubbs served two terms as governor, from January 11, 1909, to January 13, 1913. Upon ascending to the gubernatorial position, he made a name for himself by calling for the "recall of unworthy or incompetent public officials." That said, the historian Robert Sherman La Forte has argued that while Stubbs' tended to eschew patronage, his "choice of men to manage the administration's programs ... was poor", which alienated many veteran members of the state legislature.

As a prohibitionist, Stubbs also made it a priority to stamp out illegal bootlegging. Specifically, he focused his attention on Crawford County, Kansas (then nicknamed the "Little Balkans"), where many individuals were making bootleg whiskey to supplement their meager incomes as strip miners. According to the criminal justice scholar Ken Peak, "The [Little] Balkans drove him absolutely nuts. He had his hands full and sent people down to the Balkans to clean it up". Despite this immense crack down, however, the governor was unable to eradicate the crime completely from the state.

During the Stubbs administration, Kansas also enacted the nation's first state blue sky law, which was promoted by Joseph Norman Dolley, the Kansas state banking commissioner, who had been appointed by the governor on March 3, 1909.

Near the end of his second term as governor, Stubbs won his party's nomination for the U.S. Senate. However, in the general election in November 1912, Democrat William H. Thompson, defeated Stubbs in his bid for the office. Stubbs was again a candidate for the Senate in 1918, but was narrowly defeated in the Republican primary by Arthur Capper.

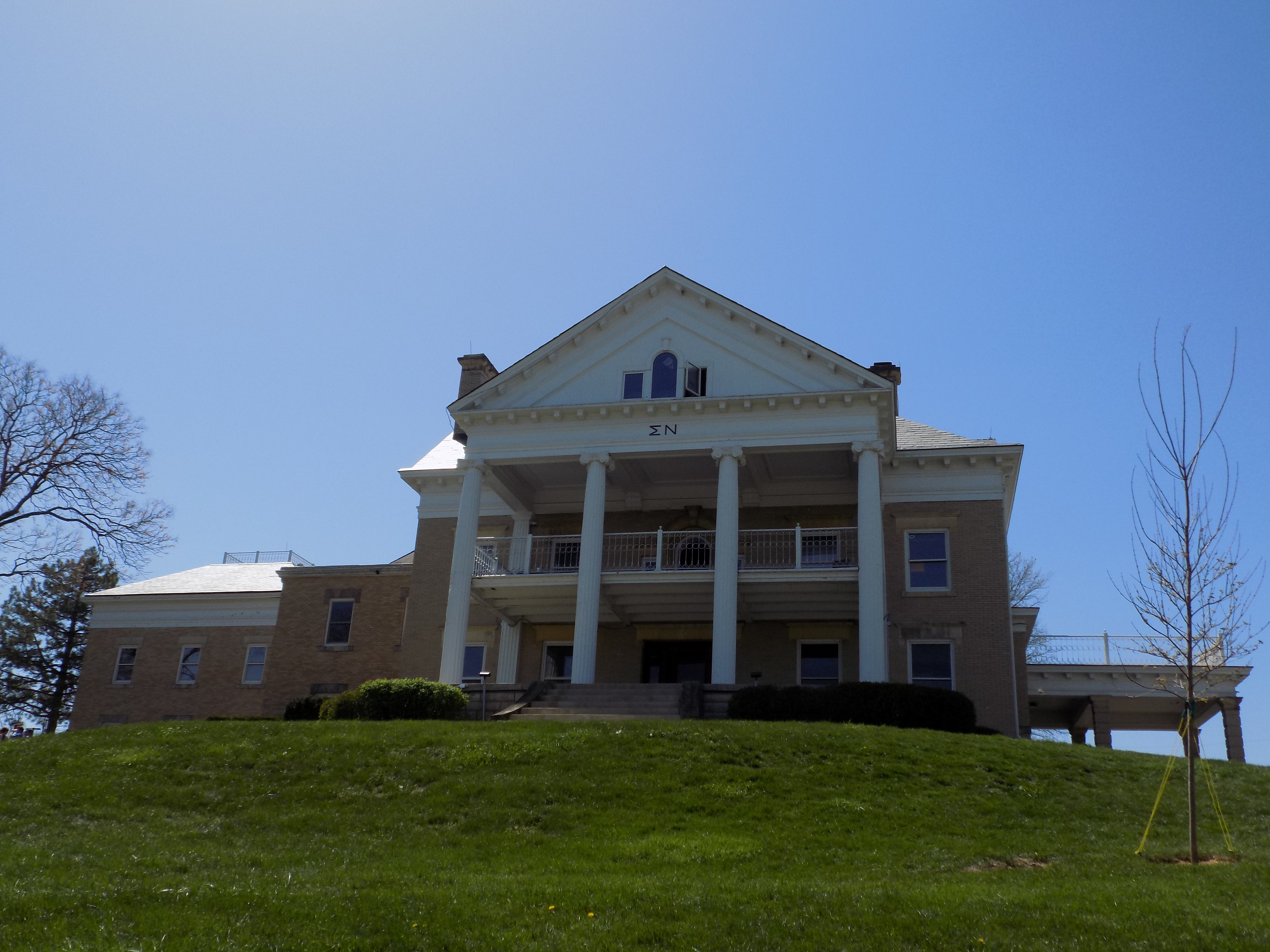
W. R. Stubbs's mansion, which is now the Sigma Nu fraternity house at the University of Kansas (2018).

Upon leaving the governor's office, Stubbs returned to his mansion on Windmill Hill in Lawrence, Kansas, situated just west of the University of Kansas campus. The building, which had been constructed in 1907, was sold by Stubbs in 1922 to KU's Sigma Nu chapter, and to this day, it is still used as their fraternity house.

=== Death ===
After suffering with heart trouble for some time, Stubbs died on March 25, 1929, in Topeka, Kansas, at the age of 70. He is interred at Oak Hill Cemetery in Lawrence.

== Electoral history ==
=== Governor of Kansas ===
Governor's election in Kansas, 1908
Party	Candidate	Votes	%
Republican	W. R. Stubbs	196,692	52.49
Democratic	Jeremiah D. Botkin	162,385	43.33
Socialist	George F. Hibner	11,721	3.13
Prohibition	Alfred L. Hope	3,886	1.04
Independence	John W. Northrop	68	0.02
Total votes		374,752	100.0
Republican hold			

Governor's election in Kansas, 1910
Party	Candidate	Votes	%
Republican	W. R. Stubbs	162,181	49.76
Democratic	George H. Hodges	146,014	44.80
Socialist	S. M. Stallard	15,384	4.72
Prohibition	William C. Cady	2,373	0.73
Total votes		325,952	100.0
Republican hold			

=== Senator of Kansas ===
Senator's election in Kansas, 1912
Party	Candidate	Votes	%
Democratic	William Howard Thompson	172,601	49.34
Republican	W. R. Stubbs	151,647	43.35
Socialist	Allan W. Ricker	25,610	7.32
Total votes		349,858	100.0
Democratic gain from Republican			

Party political offices
Preceded by Edward W. Hoch	Republican nominee for Governor of Kansas; 1908, 1910	Succeeded by Arthur Capper
First	Republican nominee for U.S. Senator from Kansas (Class 2); 1913	Succeeded by Arthur Capper
Political offices
Preceded by Edward W. Hoch	Governor of Kansas; 1909–1913	Succeeded by George H. Hodges
