= Presidency of Woodrow Wilson =

U.S. presidential administration from 1913 to 1921

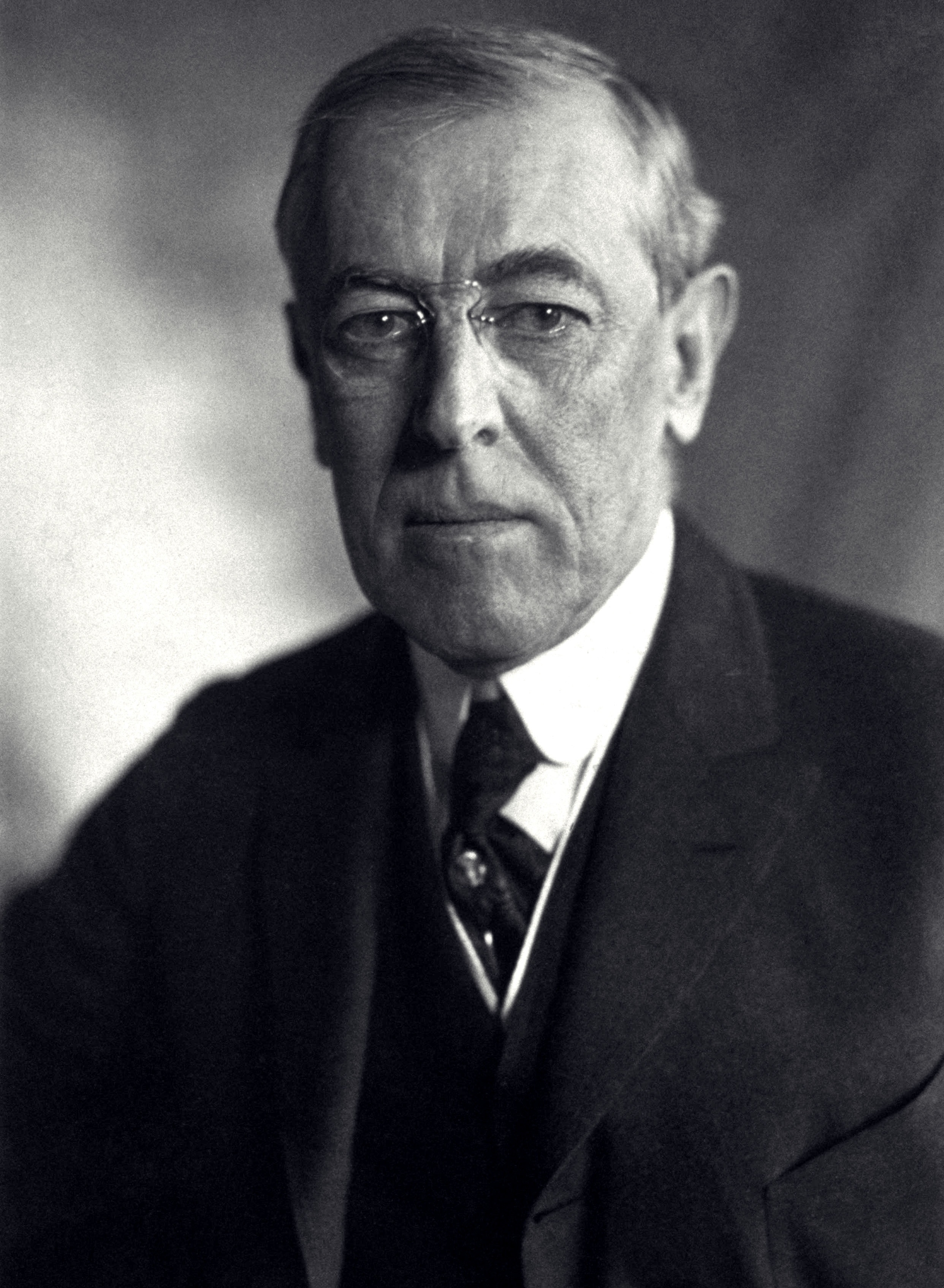
- Presidency of Woodrow Wilson; March 4, 1913 – March 4, 1921
- Vice President: Thomas R. Marshall
- Cabinet: See list
- Party: Democratic
- Election: 1912; 1916
- Seat: White House
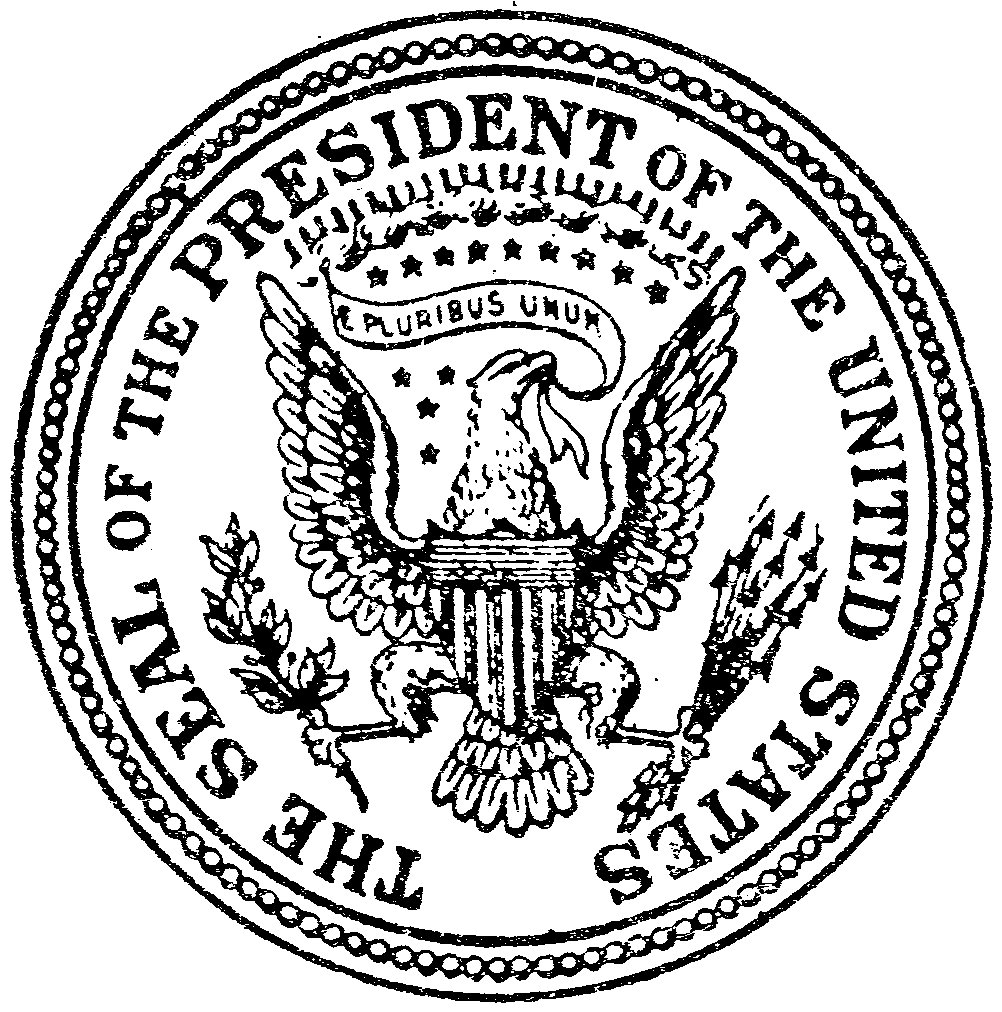
- Seal of the president (1894–1945)

Woodrow Wilson served as the 28th president of the United States from March 4, 1913, to March 4, 1921. A Democrat and former governor of New Jersey, Wilson took office after winning the 1912 presidential election, where he defeated the Republican candidate, incumbent president William Howard Taft, and the Progressive candidate, former president Theodore Roosevelt. Wilson was re-elected in 1916 by a narrow margin. Despite his New Jersey base, most Southern leaders worked with him as a fellow Southerner. Wilson suffered from several strokes late into his presidency and was succeeded by Republican Warren G. Harding, who won the 1920 election in a landslide.

Wilson was a leading force in the Progressive movement. During his first term, he oversaw the passage of progressive legislative policies unparalleled until the New Deal in the 1930s. Taking office one month after the ratification of the 16th Amendment of the Constitution permitted a federal income tax, he helped pass the Revenue Act of 1913, which introduced a low federal income tax to replace revenue lost in lower tariff rates. The income tax soared to high rates after the U.S. entered World War I in 1917. Other major progressive legislation passed during Wilson's first term included the Federal Reserve Act, the Federal Trade Commission Act of 1914, the Clayton Antitrust Act, and the Federal Farm Loan Act. With the passing of the Adamson Act—which imposed an 8-hour workday for railroads—he averted a threatened railroad strike. Concerning race issues, Wilson's administration reinforced segregationist policies for government agencies. He became deeply involved with a moralistic policy in dealing with Mexico's civil war. Upon the outbreak of World War I in 1914, the United States remained neutral and sought to broker a peace agreement between the Allies and Central Powers.

Wilson's second term was dominated by America's roles fighting and financing World War I, and designing a peaceful postwar world. In April 1917, the United States declared war on Germany, entering the conflict in the side of the Allies, as a result of the Germans' resumed unrestricted submarine warfare. Through the Selective Service Act, conscription sent 10,000 freshly trained soldiers to France per day by summer 1918. On the home front, Wilson raised income taxes, set up the War Industries Board, promoted labor union cooperation, regulated agriculture and food production through the Lever Act, and nationalized the nation's railroad system. In his 1915 State of the Union, Wilson asked Congress for what became the Espionage Act of 1917 and the Sedition Act of 1918, suppressing anti-draft activists. The crackdown was later intensified by Attorney General A. Mitchell Palmer to include expulsion of non-citizen radicals during the First Red Scare of 1919–1920. Wilson infused morality into his internationalism, an ideology now referred to as "Wilsonian"—an activist foreign policy calling on the nation to promote global democracy. In early 1918, he issued his principles for peace, the Fourteen Points, and in 1919, following the signing of an armistice with Germany, he traveled to Paris, concluding the Treaty of Versailles. Wilson embarked on a nationwide tour to campaign for the treaty, which would have included U.S. entrance into the League of Nations. He was left incapacitated by a stroke in October 1919 and the treaty failed in the Senate.

Despite his bad health and diminished mental capacity, Wilson served the remainder of his second term and hoped to get his party's nomination for a third term. In the 1920 presidential election, Republican Warren G. Harding defeated Democratic nominee James M. Cox in a landslide. Historians and political scientists rank Wilson as an above-average president, and his presidency was an important forerunner of modern American liberalism. However, Wilson has also been criticized for his racist views and actions.

== Presidential election of 1912 ==
Wilson became a prominent 1912 presidential contender immediately upon his election as Governor of New Jersey in 1910. Already famous as president of Princeton and as a leading intellectual, his political stature soared after he defeated the state's political bosses and emerged as a national leader of the Progressive movement to reform America. Prior to the 1912 Democratic National Convention, Wilson made a special effort to win the approval of three-time Democratic presidential nominee William Jennings Bryan, whose followers had largely dominated the Democratic Party since 1896. Speaker of the House Champ Clark of Missouri was viewed by many as the front-runner for the nomination, while House majority leader Oscar Underwood of Alabama also loomed as a challenger. Clark found support among the Bryan wing of the party, while Underwood appealed to the conservative Bourbon Democrats, especially in the South. On the first ballot of the Democratic National Convention, Clark won a plurality, and on the tenth ballot, he won a majority of the delegates after the New York Tammany Hall machine swung behind him. However, the Democratic Party rules required a nominee to win two-thirds of the delegates to win the nomination, and balloting continued. The Wilson campaign picked up delegates by promising the vice presidency to Governor Thomas R. Marshall of Indiana, and several Southern delegations shifted their support from Underwood to Wilson, a native Southerner. Wilson finally won two-thirds of the vote on the convention's 46th ballot, and Marshall became Wilson's running mate.

1912 Electoral Vote Map

Wilson faced a deeply divided opposition. Incumbent William Howard Taft won the Republican nomination after a bitter battle against Theodore Roosevelt, a former Republican President. Roosevelt bolted the GOP and created a new third party—the Progressive Party. A fourth candidate, Eugene V. Debs of the Socialist Party, had a small national base in the labor movement. The split in the Republican Party gave Democrats every expectation of victory for the first time since the 1892. Roosevelt emerged as Wilson's main challenger, and Wilson and Roosevelt focused on attacking each other despite sharing similarly progressive platforms that called for a strong, interventionist central government. Wilson won 435 of the 531 electoral votes and 41.8% of the popular vote, while Roosevelt won most of the remaining electoral votes and 27.4% of the popular vote, representing one of the strongest third party performances in U.S. history. Taft won 23.2% of the popular vote but just 8 electoral votes, while Debs won 6% of the popular vote. In the concurrent congressional elections, Democrats retained control of the House and won a majority in the Senate. Wilson's victory made him the first Southerner to win the presidency since 1848.

== Personnel and appointments ==
=== Cabinet and administration ===
Wilson cabinet
Office	Name	Term
President	Woodrow Wilson	1913–1921
Vice President	Thomas R. Marshall	1913–1921
Secretary of State	William Jennings Bryan	1913–1915
Robert Lansing	1915–1920
Bainbridge Colby	1920–1921
Secretary of the Treasury	William Gibbs McAdoo	1913–1918
Carter Glass	1918–1920
David F. Houston	1920–1921
Secretary of War	Lindley Miller Garrison	1913–1916
Newton D. Baker	1916–1921
Attorney General	James Clark McReynolds	1913–1914
Thomas Watt Gregory	1914–1919
A. Mitchell Palmer	1919–1921
Postmaster General	Albert S. Burleson	1913–1921
Secretary of the Navy	Josephus Daniels	1913–1921
Secretary of the Interior	Franklin Knight Lane	1913–1920
John Barton Payne	1920–1921
Secretary of Agriculture	David F. Houston	1913–1920
Edwin T. Meredith	1920–1921
Secretary of Commerce	William C. Redfield	1913–1919
Joshua W. Alexander	1919–1921
Secretary of Labor	William B. Wilson	1913–1921

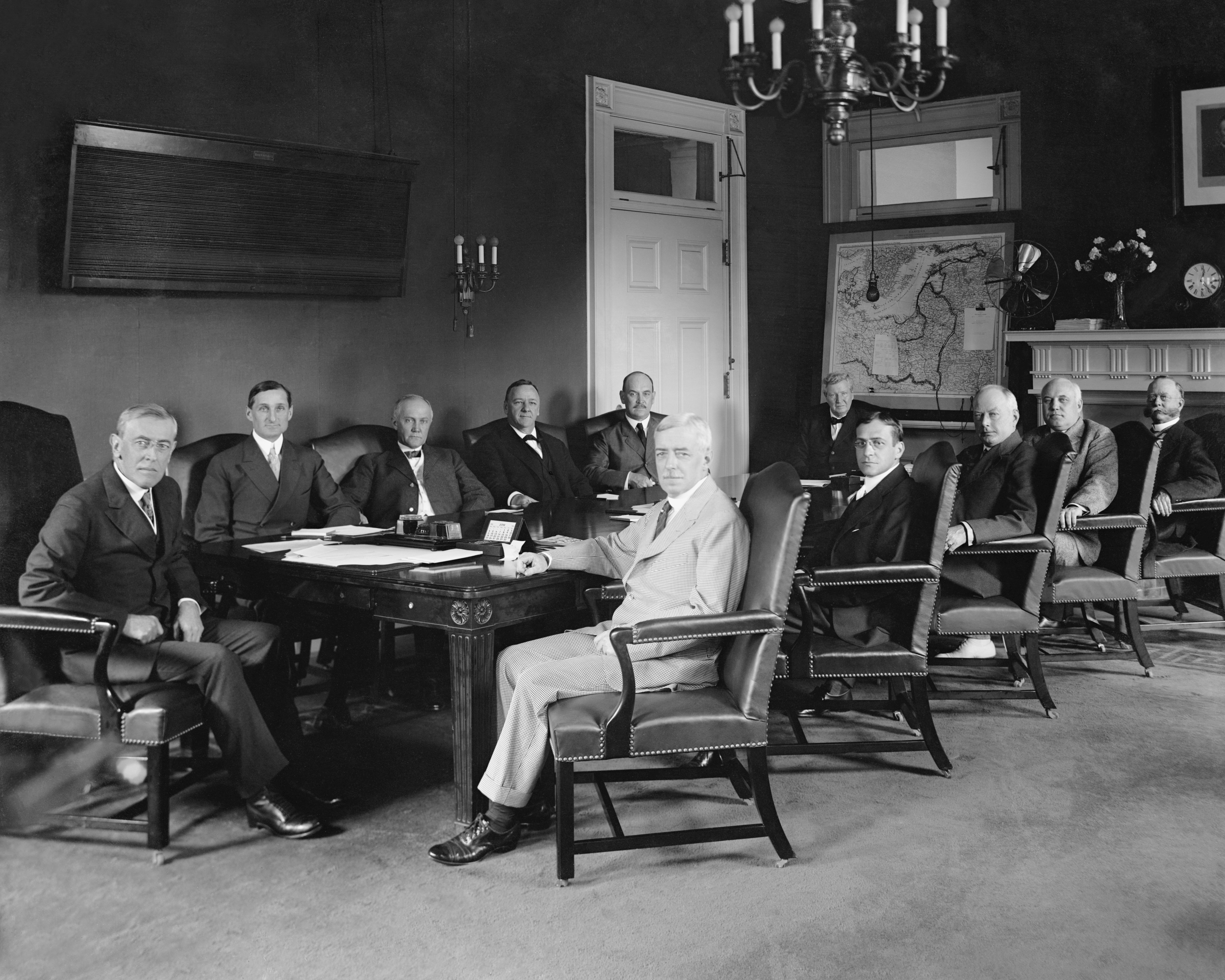
Wilson and his cabinet in 1916

After the election, Wilson quickly chose William Jennings Bryan as Secretary of State, and Bryan offered advice on the remaining members of Wilson's cabinet. William Gibbs McAdoo, a prominent Wilson supporter who married Wilson's daughter in 1914, became Secretary of the Treasury, while James Clark McReynolds, who had successfully prosecuted prominent antitrust cases, was chosen as Attorney General. On the advice of Underwood, Wilson appointed Texas Congressman Albert S. Burleson as Postmaster General. Bryan resigned in 1915 due to his opposition to Wilson's hard line toward Germany in the aftermath of the sinking of the RMS Lusitania. Bryan was replaced by Robert Lansing, and Wilson took more direct control of his administration's foreign policy after Bryan's departure. Newton D. Baker, a progressive Democrat, became Secretary of War in 1916, and Baker led the War Department during World War I. Wilson's cabinet experienced turnover after the conclusion of World War I, with Carter Glass replacing McAdoo as Secretary of the Treasury and A. Mitchell Palmer becoming Attorney General.

Wilson's chief of staff ("Secretary") was Joseph Patrick Tumulty from 1913 to 1921. Tumulty's position provided a political buffer and intermediary with the press, and his irrepressible spirit offset the president's often dour disposition. Wilson's first wife, Ellen Axson Wilson, died on August 6, 1914. Wilson married Edith Bolling Galt in 1915, and she assumed full control of Wilson's schedule, diminishing Tumulty's power. The most important foreign policy advisor and confidant was "Colonel" Edward M. House until Wilson broke with him in early 1919, for his missteps at the peace conference in Wilson's absence. Wilson's vice president, former Governor Thomas R. Marshall of Indiana, played little role in the administration.

=== Press corps ===
Wilson fervently believed that public opinion ought to shape national policy, albeit with a few exceptions involving delicate diplomacy, and he paid close attention to newspapers. Press secretary Joseph Patrick Tumulty proved generally effective until Wilson's second wife began to distrust him and reduced his influence. Wilson pioneered twice-weekly press conferences in the White House. They were modestly effective, though the president prohibited his being quoted and often made purposely vague statements. The first such press conference was held on March 15, 1913, when reporters were allowed to ask him questions.

Wilson had a mixed record with the press. Relations were generally smooth, but he ended weekly meetings with the White House correspondents after the Lusitania sinking in 1915. He also sharply restricted access during the 1919 peace conference. In both cases, Wilson was afraid that publicity would interfere with his quiet diplomacy. Journalists such as Walter Lippmann found a workaround, discovering that Colonel House was both highly talkative and devious in manipulating the press to slant its stories. A major problem facing the administration was that 90 percent of the major newspapers and magazine outside the South had traditionally favored Republicans. The administration countered this by quietly collaborating with favorable reporters who admired Wilson's leadership in the cause of world peace; their newspapers printed their reports because their scoops made news. The German-language press was vehemently hostile to Wilson, but he used this to his advantage, attacking hyphenates as loyal to a foreign country.

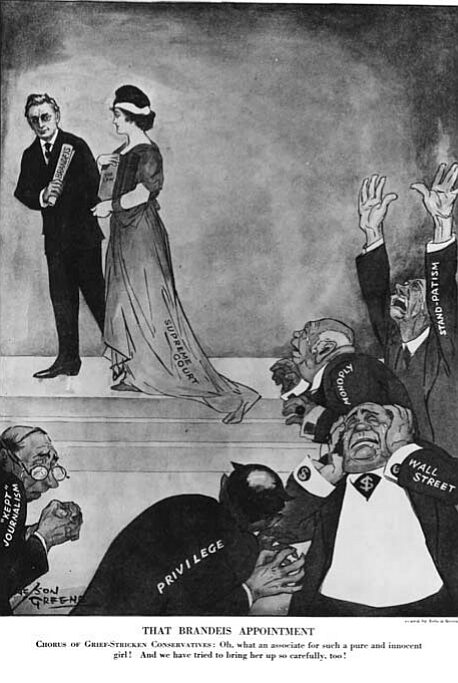
Brandeis appointment dismays “Kept Journalism, Privilege, Wall Street, Monopoly, and Stand-Pattism in 1916 PUCK cartoon

=== Judicial appointments ===
Wilson appointed three men to the United States Supreme Court. He appointed James Clark McReynolds in 1914; he was an arch-conservative who served until 1941. Wilson wanted to appoint Louis Brandeis to his Cabinet in 1913, but he was too controversial then and instead served privately as Wilson's chief legal advisor. In 1916, Wilson nominated Brandeis to the Court, setting off a major debate over Brandeis's progressive ideology and his religion; Brandeis was the first Jew named to the Supreme Court and anti-semitism was rampant in upper-class circles. But Brandeis had many friends who admired his legal acumen in fighting for progressive causes. They mounted a national publicity campaign that marginalized anti-semitic slurs in the legal profession. Wilson worked hard and convinced Senate Democrats to vote for Brandeis, who served as an arch-liberal until 1939. In 1916 Wilson appointed John Hessin Clarke, a progressive lawyer who resigned in 1922 after bitter disputes with McReynolds.

In addition to his three Supreme Court appointments, Wilson also appointed 20 judges to the United States Courts of Appeals and 52 judges to the United States district courts.

== Domestic policy ==
Franklin D. Roosevelt at a Flag Day Celebration with Woodrow Wilson and Josephus Daniels - 14 June 1913

=== New Freedom ===
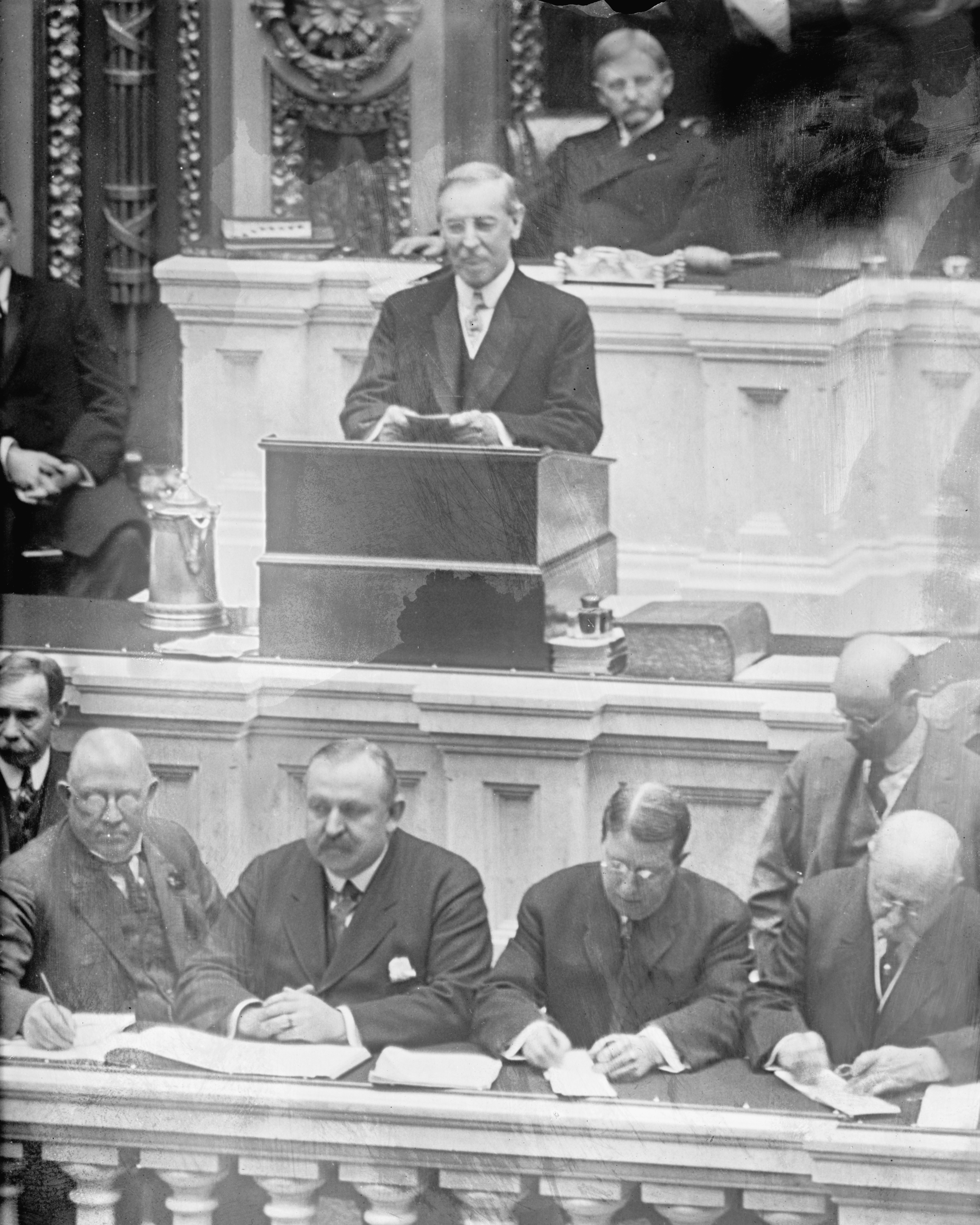
Wilson giving his first State of the Union address, the first time since 1800 a president addressed Congress in person.

With the support of the Democratic Congress, Wilson introduced a comprehensive program of domestic legislation at the outset of his administration, something no president had ever done before. The Democrats had four major priorities: the conservation of natural resources, banking reform, tariff reduction, and equal access to raw materials, which was accomplished in part through the regulation of trusts. Foreign affairs increasingly dominated his presidency starting in 1915, Wilson's first two years in office largely focused on domestic policy, and the president found success in implementing much of his ambitious "New Freedom" agenda.

==== Lower tariff and new income tax ====
Democrats had long attacked high tariff rates as equivalent to unfair taxes on consumers, and tariff reduction was the first priority. Wilson argued that the system of high tariffs "cuts us off from our proper part in the commerce of the world, violates the just principles of taxation, and makes the government a facile instrument in the hands of private interests." While most Democrats were united behind a decrease in tariff rates, most Republicans held that high tariff rates were useful for protecting domestic manufacturing and factory workers against foreign competition. Shortly before Wilson took office, the Sixteenth Amendment, which had been proposed by Republicans in 1909 during a debate over tariff legislation, was ratified by the requisite number of states. Following the ratification of the Sixteenth Amendment, Democratic leaders agreed to attach an income tax provision to their tariff reduction bill, partly to make up for lost revenue, and partly to shift the burden of funding the government towards the high earners that would be subject to the income tax.

In May 1913, House Majority Leader Oscar Underwood organized House passage of a bill that cut the average tariff rate by 10 percent. Underwood's bill, which represented the largest downward revision of the tariff since the Civil War, aggressively cut rates for raw materials, goods deemed to be "necessities", and products produced domestically by trusts, but it retained higher tariff rates for luxury goods. The bill also instituted a tax on personal income above $4,000. Passage of Underwood's tariff bill in the Senate proved more difficult than in the House, partially because some Southern and Western Democrats favored the continued protection of the wool and sugar industries, and partially because Democrats had a narrower majority in that chamber. Seeking to marshal support for the tariff bill, President Wilson met extensively with Democratic senators and appealed directly to the people through the press. After weeks of hearings and debate, Wilson and Secretary of State Bryan managed to unite Senate Democrats behind the bill. The Senate voted 44 to 37 in favor of the bill, with only one Democrat voting against it and only one Republican voting for it. Wilson signed the Revenue Act of 1913 (called the "Underwood Tariff") into law on October 3, 1913.

The Revenue Act of 1913 reduced the average import tariff rates from 40 percent to 26 percent. It also imposed a federal income tax for the first time since 1872. Congress adopted an income tax in the 1890s, but that tax had been struck down by the Supreme Court before taking effect. The Revenue Act of 1913 imposed a one percent tax on incomes above $3,000, with a top tax rate of six percent on those earning more than $500,000 per year. Approximately three percent of the population was subject to the income tax. The bill also included a one percent tax on the net income of all corporations, superseding a previous federal tax that had only applied to corporate net incomes above $5,000. The Supreme Court upheld the constitutionality of the income tax in the cases of Brushaber v. Union Pacific Railroad Co. and Stanton v. Baltic Mining Co.

Facing the need for further revenue due to an arms build-up, in 1916 the Wilson administration called for the passage of another major revenue bill. President Wilson and congressional allies like Congressman Claude Kitchin rejected proposal to increase tariff rates, instead favoring increased taxes on high earners. Working with progressive Republicans, Congressional Democrats won passage of the Revenue Act of 1916, which reinstated the federal estate tax, established a tax on the production of munitions, raised the top income tax rate to fifteen percent, and raised the corporate income tax from one percent to two percent. That same year, the President signed a law that established the Tariff Commission, which was charged with providing expert advice on tariff rates. In the 1920s, Republicans raised tariffs and lowered the income tax. Nonetheless, the policies of the Wilson administration had a durable impact on the composition of government revenue, which after the 1920s primarily came from taxation rather than tariffs.

==== Federal Reserve System ====
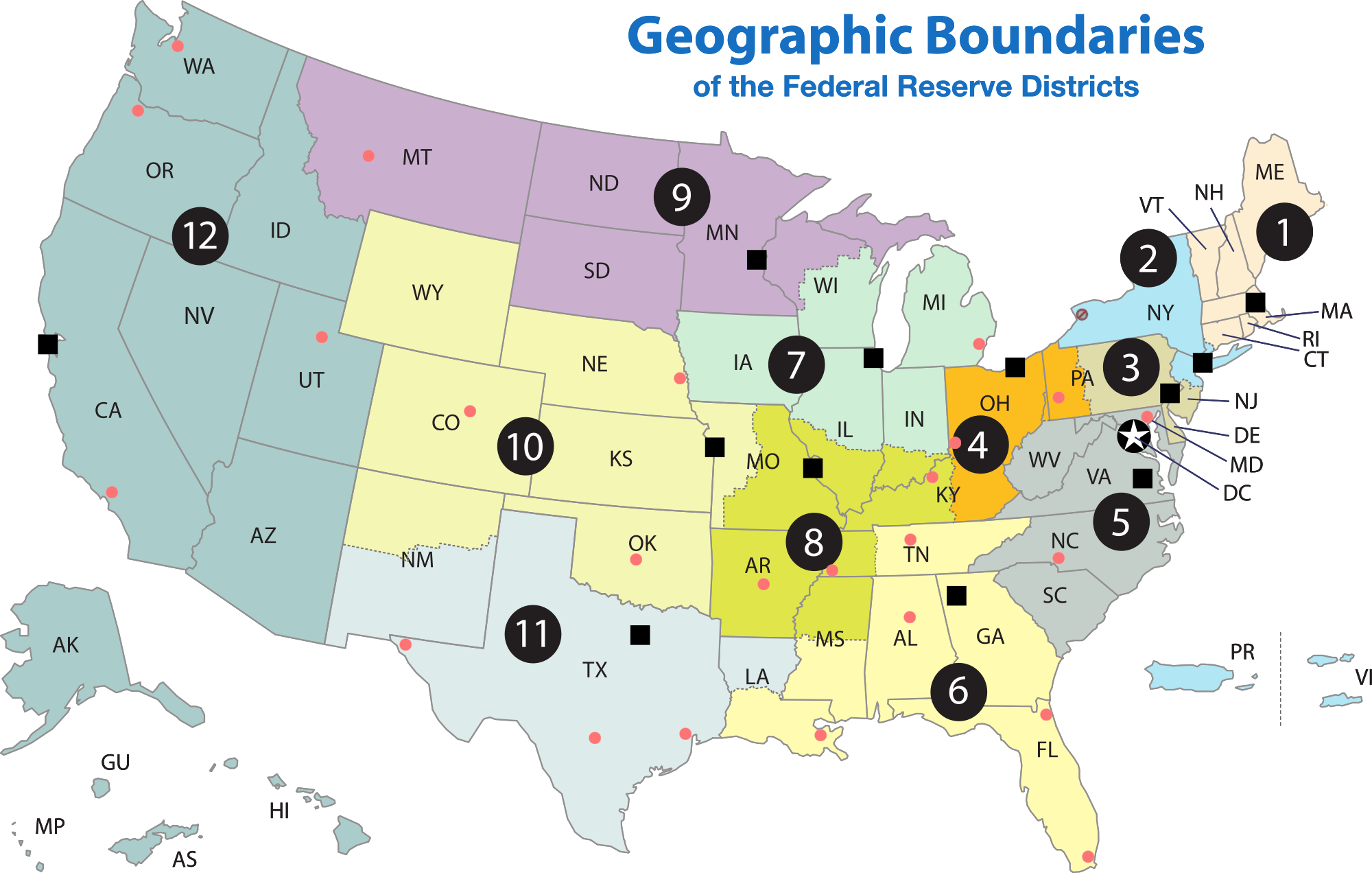
Map of Federal Reserve Districts–black circles, Federal Reserve Banks–black squares, District branches–red circles and Washington HQ–star/black circle

President Wilson did not wait to complete the Revenue Act of 1913 before proceeding to the next item on his agenda—banking. Britain and Germany had strong financial controls through government-run central banks, but the United States had not had a central bank since the Bank War of the 1830s. In the aftermath of the Panic of 1907, there was general agreement among bankers and leaders in both parties of the necessity to create some sort of central banking system to provide coordination during financial emergencies. Most leaders also sought currency reform, as they believed that the roughly $3.8 billion in coins and banknotes did not provide an adequate money supply during financial panics. Under conservative Republican Senator Nelson Aldrich's leadership, the National Monetary Commission had put forward a plan to establish a central banking system that would issue currency and provide oversight and loans to the nation's banks. However, many progressives led by Bryan distrusted the plan due to the degree of influence bankers would have over the central banking system. Relying heavily on the advice of Louis Brandeis, Wilson sought a middle ground between progressives such as Bryan and conservative Republicans like Aldrich. He declared that the banking system must be "public not private, [and] must be vested in the government itself so that the banks must be the instruments, not the masters, of business."

Democratic Congressmen Carter Glass and Robert L. Owen crafted a compromise plan in which private banks would control twelve regional Federal Reserve Banks, but the ultimate control of the system was placed in a central board filled with presidential appointees. The system of twelve regional banks was designed with the goal of diminishing Wall Street's influence. Wilson convinced Bryan's supporters that the plan met their demands for an elastic currency because Federal Reserve notes would be obligations of the government. The bill passed the House in September 1913, but it faced stronger opposition in the Senate. Wilson convinced just enough Democrats to defeat an amendment put forth by bank president Frank A. Vanderlip that would have given private banks greater control over the central banking system. The Senate then voted 54–34 to approve the Federal Reserve Act. Wilson signed the bill into law in December 1913. The president appointed Paul Warburg and other prominent bankers to direct the new system. While power was supposed to be decentralized, the New York branch dominated the Federal Reserve as the "first among equals." The new system began operations in 1915, and it played an important role in financing the Allied and American war efforts in World War I.

According to one study, the Federal Reserve Act “benefited the commonweal by improving the money supply and credit system, especially in the West.”

==== Antitrust legislation ====
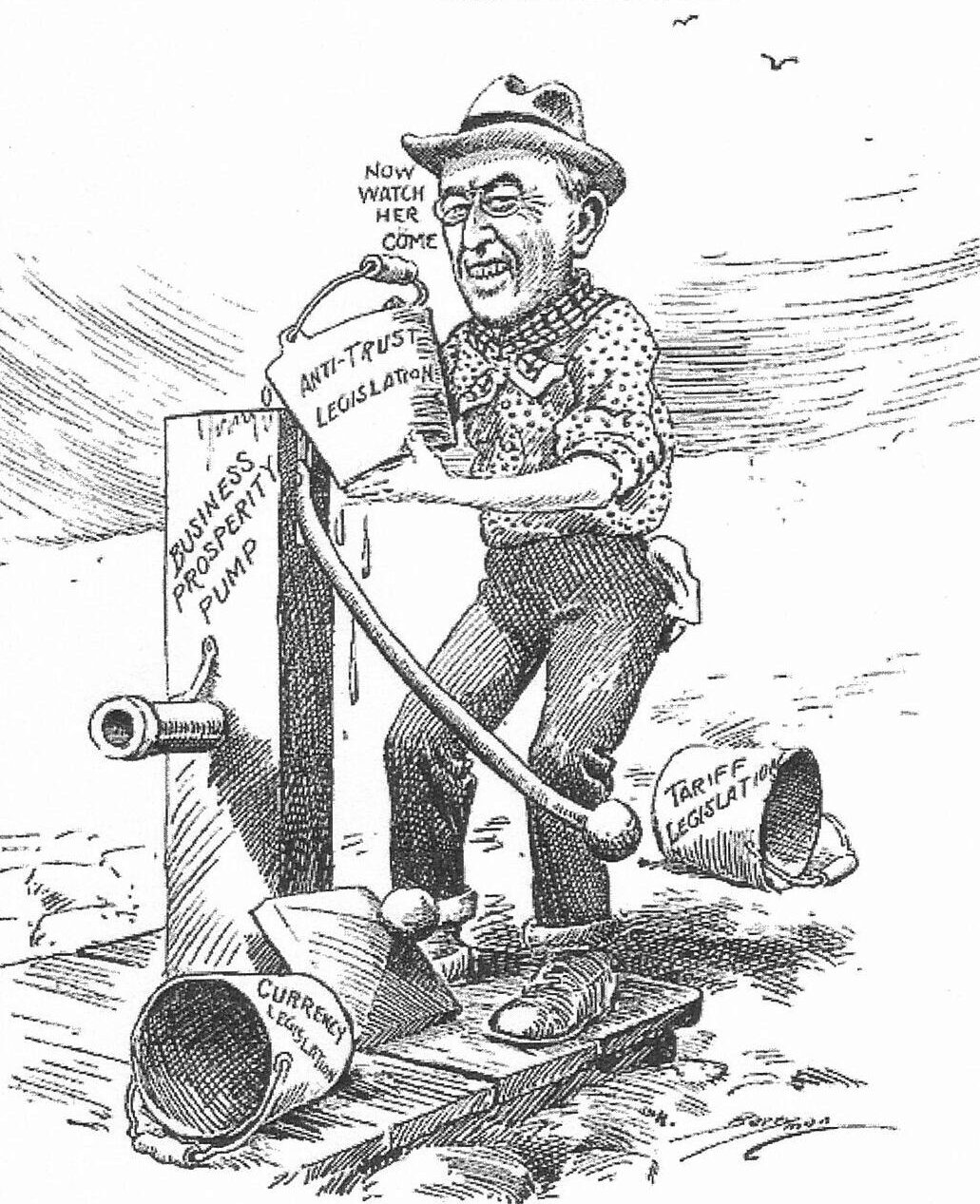
In a 1913 cartoon, Wilson primes the economic pump with tariff, currency and antitrust laws

Next on the agenda was antitrust legislation to supplant the Sherman Antitrust Act of 1890. The Sherman Antitrust Act had barred any "contract, combination...or conspiracy, in restraint of trade", but had proved ineffective in preventing the rise of large business combinations known as trusts. Roosevelt and Taft had both escalated antitrust prosecution by the Justice Department, but many progressives desired legislation that would do more to prevent trusts from dominating the economy. While Roosevelt believed that trusts could be separated into "good trusts" and "bad trusts" based on their effects on the broader economy, Wilson had argued for breaking up all trusts during his 1912 presidential campaign. In December 1913, Wilson asked Congress to pass an antitrust law that would ban many anti-competitive practices. A month later, in January 1914, he also asked for the creation of an interstate trade commission, eventually known as the Federal Trade Commission (FTC), that would preside over the dissolution of trusts but would play no role in antitrust prosecution itself.

With Wilson's support, Congressman Henry Clayton, Jr. introduced a bill that would ban several anti-competitive practices such discriminatory pricing, tying, exclusive dealing, and interlocking directorates. The bill also allowed individuals to launch antitrust suits, and it limited the applicability of antitrust laws on unions. As the difficulty of banning all anti-competitive practices via legislation became clear, President Wilson came to favor legislation granting the FTC greater discretion to investigate antitrust violations and enforce antitrust laws independently of the Justice Department. The Federal Trade Commission Act of 1914, which incorporated Wilson's ideas regarding the FTC, passed Congress with bipartisan support, and Wilson signed the bill into law in September 1914. One month later, Wilson signed the Clayton Antitrust Act of 1914, which built on the Sherman Act by defining and banning several anti-competitive practices.

==== Labor issues ====
President Taft had established the Commission on Industrial Relations to study labor issues, but the Senate had rejected all of his nominees to the commission. Upon taking office, Wilson nominated a mix of conservatives and progressive reformers, with commission chairman Frank P. Walsh falling into the latter group. The commission helped expose numerous labor abuses throughout the nation, and Walsh proposed reforms designed to empower unions. Prior to his first presidential inauguration, Wilson had had an uneasy relationship with union leaders such as Samuel Gompers of the American Federation of Labor, and he generally believed that workers were best protected through laws rather than unions. Wilson and Secretary of Labor William Bauchop Wilson rejected Walsh's proposed reforms, and instead focused on using the Labor Department to mediate conflicts between labor and ownership. The labor policies of Wilson's administration were tested by a strike against the Colorado Fuel and Iron Company in late 1913 and early 1914. The company rejected the Labor Department's attempts to mediate, and a militia controlled by the company attacked a miner's camp in what became known as the Ludlow Massacre. At the Governor of Colorado's request, the Wilson administration sent in troops to end the dispute, but mediation efforts failed after the union called off the strike due to a lack of funds.

In mid-1916, a major railroad strike endangered the nation's economy. The president called the parties to a White House summit in August — after two days and no results, Wilson proceeded to settle the issue, using the maximum eight-hour work day as its linchpin. Congress passed the Adamson Act, which incorporated the president's proposed eight-hour work day for railroads. As a result, the strike was then canceled. Wilson took credit in the fall campaign for averting a national economic disaster. Business-oriented conservatives denounced it as a sellout to the unions and the Republicans made it a major campaign issue. The Adamson Act was the first federal law that regulated hours worked by private employees, and it was upheld by the Supreme Court.

Wilson thought a child labor law would probably be unconstitutional but reversed himself in 1916 with a close election approaching. In 1916, after intense campaigns by the National Child Labor Committee (NCLC) and the National Consumers League, the Congress passed the Keating–Owen Act by large majorities. It became illegal to ship goods in interstate commerce if they were made in factories employing children under specified ages. Southern Democrats were opposed but did not filibuster. Wilson endorsed the bill at the last minute under pressure from party leaders who stressed how popular the idea was, especially among the emerging class of female voters. He told Democratic Congressmen they needed to pass this law and also a workman's compensation law to satisfy the national progressive movement and to win the 1916 election against a reunited GOP. It was the first federal child labor law. However, the U.S. Supreme Court struck down the law in Hammer v. Dagenhart (1918). Congress then passed a law taxing businesses that used child labor, but that was struck down by the Supreme Court in Bailey v. Drexel Furniture (1923). Child labor was finally ended in the 1930s. He approved the goal of upgrading the harsh working conditions for merchant sailors and signed LaFollette's Seamen's Act of 1915. Several other measures aimed at improving wages and conditions for other categories of workers were also passed.

Although Congress was dominated by progressives during much of Wilson’s time in office, various labor measures failed to pass. In March 1914, a bill was passed in the House of Representatives providing for a bureau of occupational safety and health in the Department of Labor, and that same month a bill was also passed in the House that allowed states to ban the entry of convict labor-made goods. However, opposition in the Senate prevented both bills from being passed in that body. Later, in September 1918, a bill was passed in the House of Representatives with 252 votes for and 17 votes against providing for a minimum wage for federal employees. However, the bill stalled in the Senate and failed to pass during the remainder of Wilson’s presidency.

==== Agricultural issues ====
President Wilson's agricultural policies were heavily influenced by Walter Hines Page, who favored a reorganization of the U.S. Department of Agriculture to put less focus on scientific research and more emphasis on using the department to provide education and other services directly to farmers. Secretary of Agriculture David F. Houston presided over the implementation of many of Page's proposed reforms and worked with Congressman Asbury Francis Lever to introduce the bill that became the Smith–Lever Act of 1914. This act established government subsidies for a demonstration farming program allowing farmers to voluntarily experiment with farming techniques favored by agricultural experts. Proponents of the Smith–Lever Act overcame many conservatives' objections by adding provisions to bolster local control of the program. Local agricultural colleges supervised the agricultural extension agents, and the agents were barred from operating without county governments' approval. By 1924, three-quarters of the agriculture-oriented counties in the United States took part in the agricultural extension program. With the Model T craze roaring along, the demand for better roads was irresistible, with efforts coordinated by the American Automobile Association (formed in 1902) and the American Association of State Highway Officials (formed in 1914). The slogan was "Get America Out of the Mud!" The Federal Aid Road Act of 1916, provided federal subsidies to road-building in every state. A number of other measures designed to support farmers were also passed.

Wilson disliked the excessive government involvement in the Federal Farm Loan Act, which created twelve regional banks empowered to provide low-interest loans to farmers. Nevertheless, he needed the farm vote to survive the upcoming 1916 election, so he signed it.

==== The Philippines and Puerto Rico ====
Wilson embraced the long-standing Democratic policy against owning colonies, and he worked for the gradual autonomy and ultimate independence of the Philippines, which had been acquired from Spain in the Spanish–American War. The final phases of the Philippine–American War were still ongoing during the first several months of Wilson's presidency, with the American victory at the Battle of Bud Bagsak in June 1913 bringing an end to nearly 15 years of anti-American resistance on the islands. Inheriting the Philippine policy of his predecessors, Wilson increased self-governance on the islands by granting Filipinos greater control over the Philippine Legislature. The House passed a measure to grant the Philippines full independence, but Republicans blocked this proposal in the Senate. The Jones Act of 1916 committed the United States to the eventual independence of the Philippines; independence took place in 1946. The Jones Act of 1917 upgraded the status of Puerto Rico, which had also been acquired from Spain in 1898. The act, which superseded the Foraker Act, created the Senate of Puerto Rico, established a bill of rights, and authorized the election of a Resident Commissioner (previously appointed by the president) to a four-year term. The act also granted Puerto Ricans U.S. citizenship and exempted Puerto Rican bonds from federal, state, and local taxes.

==== Immigration policy ====
Immigration was a bitterly contested issue before the World War, but President Wilson gave the matter little attention, even though he came from immigrant roots himself. In 1913, California enacted the California Alien Land Law of 1913 to exclude Japanese non-citizens from owning any land in the state. The Japanese government protested strongly, and Wilson sent Bryan to California to mediate. Bryan was unable to get California to relax the restrictions, and Wilson accepted the law even though it violated a 1911 treaty with Japan. The law bred resentment in Japan which lingered into the 1920s and 1930s.

As America entered the war, many Irish and German Americans were alienated—they did not want to help Britain or fight Germany. These Irish and German "Hyphenated American" elements repulsed Wilson because he believed that they were motivated to help the goals of Ireland and Germany, not to the needs and values of the United States. Many reacted by voting against the Democrats in 1918 and 1920.

Migration from Europe, or return thereto, ended in 1914, as European nations closed their borders during World War I. Wilson's progressivism encouraged his belief that immigrants from Southern and Eastern Europe, though poor and illiterate, could assimilate into a homogeneous white middle class, and he opposed the restrictive immigration policies that many members of both parties favored. Wilson vetoed the Immigration Act of 1917, but Congress overrode the veto. The act's goal was to reduce unskilled European immigration by requiring literacy tests. It was the first U.S. law to restrict immigration from Europe, and it foreshadowed the more restrictive immigration laws of the 1920s.

=== Home front during World War I ===
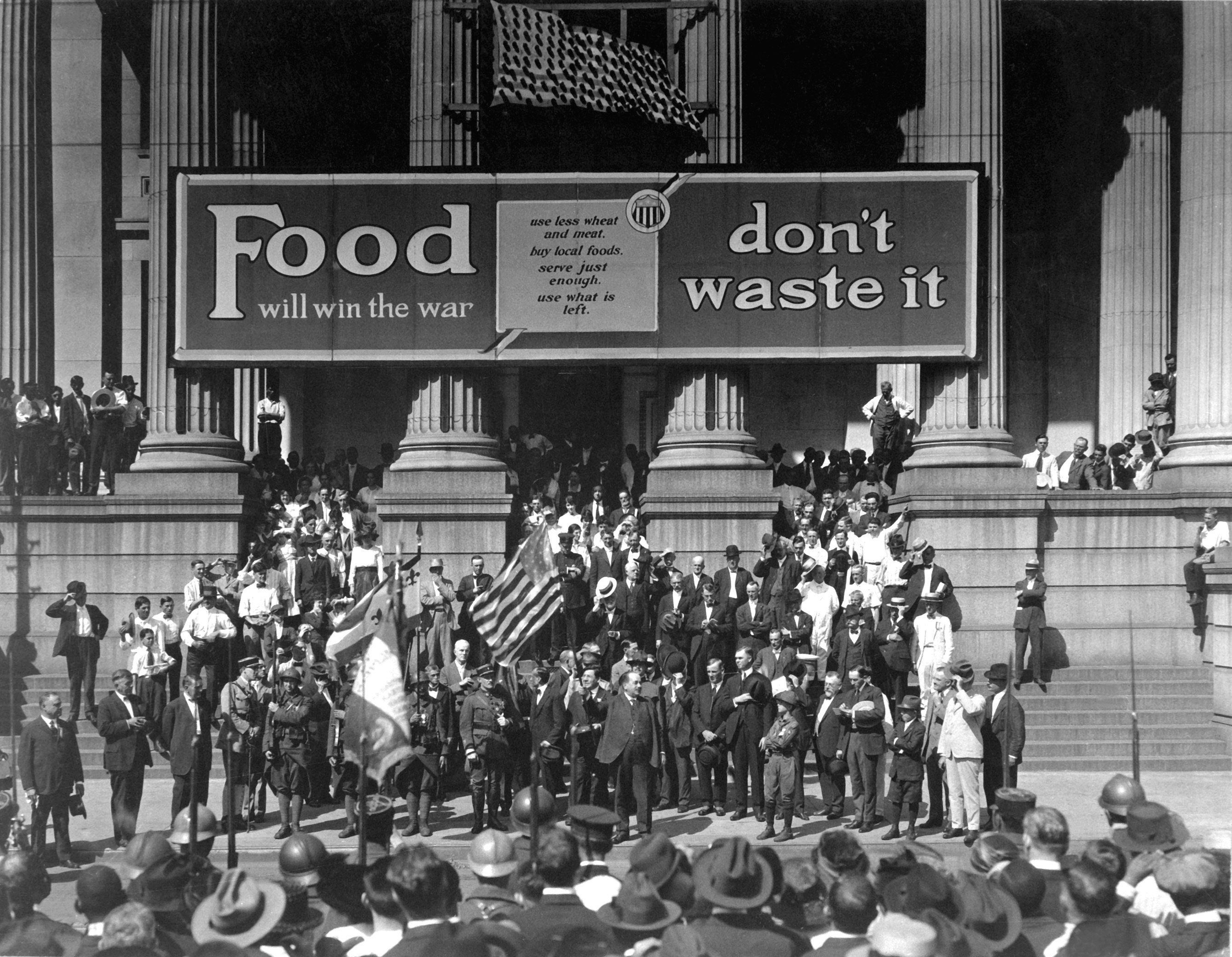
Liberty Loan drive in front of City Hall, New Orleans. On City Hall is a banner reading "Food will win the war—don't waste it".

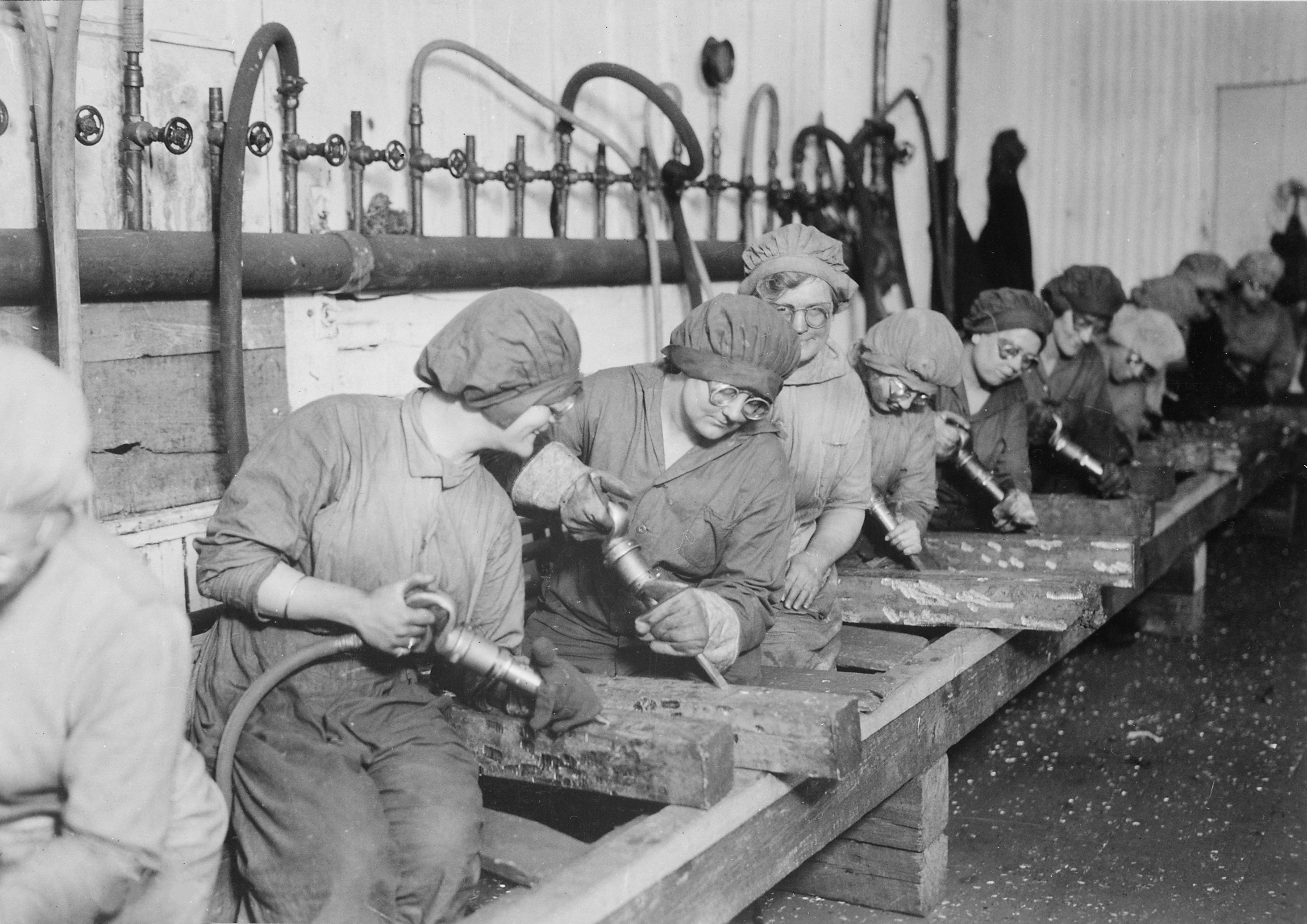
Women workers in ordnance shops, Pennsylvania, 1918

With the American entrance into World War I in April 1917, Wilson became wartime leader of a poorly prepared nation with fresh manpower and the world's largest industrial and financial base. He set up the War Industries Board, headed by Bernard Baruch, to set war manufacturing policies and goals. It took many months to get it working right. Herbert Hoover came back from his famous rescue work in Belgium to quickly lead the Food Administration to provide food for home and for the Allied coalition, whose younger farmers were in the armies. A new United States Fuel Administration, run by Harry Augustus Garfield, introduced daylight saving time and rationed fuel supplies so as to send more oil to Europe. William McAdoo took charge of war bond efforts; Vance C. McCormick headed the War Trade Board. These men, known collectively as the "war cabinet", met weekly with Wilson. The State Department was headed by Robert Lansing, but Wilson and his top advisor Colonel House took full control of war policies. Wilson delegated a large degree of authority over the home front to his subordinates. He largely left military matters to his War and Navy departments

The great majority of labor unions, including the AFL and the railroad brotherhoods, supported the war effort, and were rewarded for their efforts with high pay and access to Wilson. Unions saw enormous growth in membership and wages during the war, and strikes were rare. Wilson established the National War Labor Board (NWLB) to mediate wartime labor disputes, but it was slow to organize, and the Labor Department provided mediation services in most disputes. Wilson's labor policies continued to stress mediation and agreement on all sides. When Smith & Wesson refused to assent to an NWLB ruling, the War Department seized control of the gun company and forced employees to return to work.

==== Financing the war ====
Large amounts of money was needed to finance the war—to buy food and munitions for the soldiers, to pay them, and to loan $7 billion to the Allies for their purchasing needs. The GDP in 1917 plus 1918 was $124 billion. Since the dollar then was worth about $20 in 2021, that is about $2.5 trillion in 2021 dollars. The original military cost of the war was $28 billion; counting non-military costs as well brings the total to $33 billion. Not included are the much larger eventual totals for veterans benefits and interest.

The United States had by far the best financial performance of any country in the war. In all, $38 billion was raised, 36% from taxes and 64% from bonds. Five "Liberty Loan" campaigns induced people save more than $20 billion in savings bonds. That meant that civilian spending was shifted into the future when the bonds came due. Taxes were raised, especially on income taxes for the rich and on corporate profits, as well as luxuries, tobacco, and liquor. The new Federal Reserve System expanded the money supply, and prices doubled. People on fixed incomes suffered a sharp drop in purchasing power; the economic resources they no longer used were diverted to war production. That is, inflation was a hidden tax that was in addition to the obvious taxes. The government made sure that farmers and war workers enjoyed higher incomes—a strong incentive to switch from the civilian to the munitions sectors. The financing of the war was broadly successful. Later generations of taxpayers absorbed about half the economic cost of the war, and the people at the time the other half.

The foreign loans stabilized the Allied economies and strengthened their ability to fight and to produce weapons, and thus helped the American war effort. By the end of the war, the United States had become a creditor nation for the first time in its history. But the loans caused no end of diplomatic problems when Washington in the 1920s demanded (and did not get) full repayment. In 1932, 90% was written off because of the Great Depression; after that the issue was largely forgotten and the loans were finally repaid in 1951.

In the midst of the war, the federal budget soared from $1 billion in fiscal year 1916 to $19 billion in fiscal year 1919. The War Revenue Act of 1917 raised the top tax rate to 67 percent, greatly increased the number of Americans paying the income tax (approximately 5.5 million Americans paid an income tax in 1920), and levied an excess profits tax on businesses. The Revenue Act of 1918 raised the top tax rate to 77 percent and further increased other taxes.

==== Propaganda ====
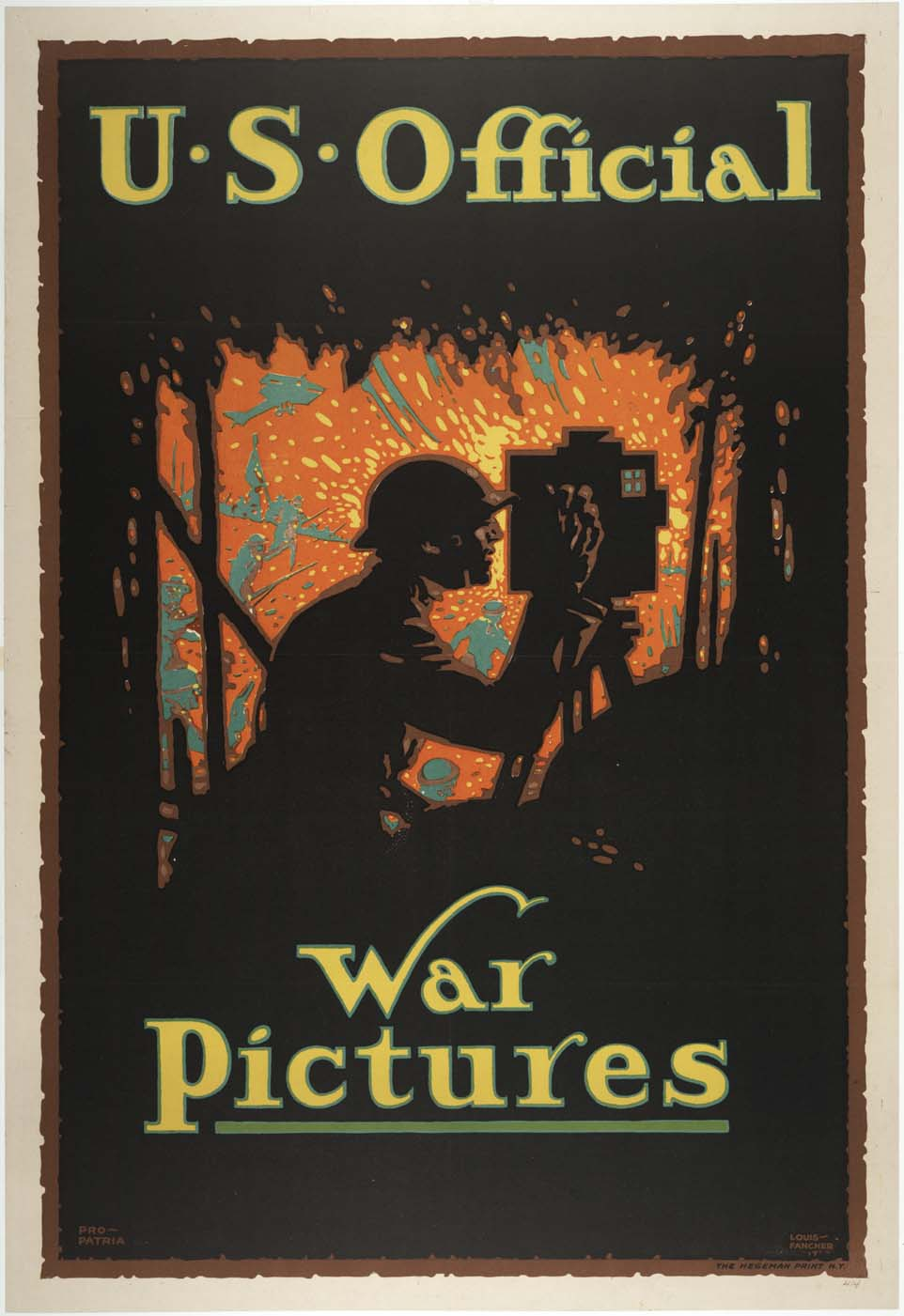
"U.S. Official War Pictures", CPI poster by Louis D. Fancher

Ridiculing German claims of superior culture. Harry R. Hopps

Wilson established the first modern propaganda office, the Committee on Public Information (CPI), headed by George Creel. Creel set out to systematically reach every person in the United States multiple times with patriotic information about how the individual could contribute to the war effort. He set up divisions in his new agency to produce and distribute innumerable copies of posters, pamphlets, newspaper releases, magazine advertisements, films, school campaigns, and the speeches of the Four Minute Men. The CPI also worked with the Post Office to censor seditious counter-propaganda. The CPI trained thousands of volunteer speakers to make patriotic appeals during the four-minute breaks needed to change reels at movie theaters. CPI volunteers also spoke at churches, lodges, fraternal organizations, labor unions, and even logging camps. Creel boasted that in 18 months his 75,000 volunteers delivered over 7.5 million four minute orations to over 300 million listeners, in a nation of 103 million people.

==== Disloyalty ====
To counter disloyalty to the war effort at home, Wilson pushed through Congress the Espionage Act of 1917 and the Sedition Act of 1918 to suppress anti-British, pro-German, or anti-war statements. While he welcomed socialists who supported the war, he pushed at the same time to arrest and deport foreign-born enemies. After the war many recent immigrants, resident aliens without U.S. citizenship, who opposed America's participation in the war were deported to Russia or other nations under the powers granted in the Immigration Act of 1918. The Wilson administration relied heavily on state and local police forces, as well as local voluntary organizations, to enforce war-time laws. Anarchists, Industrial Workers of the World members, and other antiwar groups attempting to sabotage the war effort were targeted by the Department of Justice; many of their leaders were arrested for incitement to violence, espionage, or sedition. Eugene Debs, the 1912 Socialist presidential candidate, was convicted for encouraging young men to evade the draft. In response to concerns over civil liberties, the American Civil Liberties Union (ACLU), a private organization devoted to the defense of free speech, was founded in 1917.

Wilson called on voters in the 1918 mid-term elections to elect Democrats as an endorsement of his policies. However the Republicans won over alienated German-Americans and took control. Wilson refused to coordinate or compromise with the new leaders of House and Senate—Senator Henry Cabot Lodge became his nemesis.

=== Prohibition ===
Prohibition developed as an unstoppable reform during the war, but Wilson and his administration only played a minor role in its passage. A combination of the temperance movement, hatred of everything German (including beer and saloons), and activism by churches and women led to ratification of an amendment to achieve Prohibition in the United States. A Constitutional amendment passed both houses in December 1917 by 2/3 votes. By January 16, 1919, the Eighteenth Amendment had been ratified by 36 of the states. On October 28, 1919, Congress passed enabling legislation, the Volstead Act, to enforce the Eighteenth Amendment. Wilson felt Prohibition was unenforceable, but his veto of the Volstead Act was overridden by Congress. Prohibition began on January 16, 1920; the manufacture, importation, sale, and transport of alcohol were prohibited, except in specific cases (such as wine used for religious purposes).

=== Women's suffrage ===
Wilson privately opposed women's suffrage as late as 1911 because he felt women lacked the public experience needed to be good voters. Looking at the actual evidence of how female voters behaved in the western states changed his mind, and he came to feel they could indeed be good voters. He did not speak publicly on the issue except to echo the Democratic Party position that suffrage was a state matter, primarily because of strong opposition in the white South to Black voting rights.

A win for suffrage in New York state, combined with the increasingly prominent role women took in the war effort in factories and at home, convinced Wilson and many others to fully support national women's suffrage. In a January 1918 speech before Congress, Wilson for the first time endorsed a national right to vote: "We have made partners of the women in this war....Shall we admit them only to a partnership of suffering and sacrifice and toil and not to a partnership of privilege and right?" Later in January, the House quickly passed a constitutional amendment providing for women's suffrage in a 274 to 136 vote, but the campaign for women's suffrage stalled in the Senate. While the vast majority of Republicans favored the amendment, Southern Democrats stood opposed. Wilson continually pressured senators to vote for the bill, and in June 1919 the Senate approved the amendment. The requisite number of states ratified the Nineteenth Amendment in August 1920. That same year, Wilson appointed Helen H. Gardener to a seat on the United States Civil Service Commission, the highest position a woman had ever held in the federal government up to that time.

=== Demobilization and First Red Scare ===
Wilson's leadership in domestic policy in the aftermath of the war was complicated by his focus on the Treaty of Versailles and opposition from the Republican-controlled Congress. It ended in late 1919 with his incapacity. A plan to form a commission for the purpose of demobilization of the war effort was abandoned due to the Republican control of the Senate, as Republicans could block the appointment of commission members. Instead, Wilson favored the prompt dismantling of wartime boards and regulatory agencies. Though McAdoo and others favored extending government control of railroads under the United States Railroad Administration, Congress passed the Esch–Cummins Act, which restored private control in 1920.

Demobilization of the army was chaotic and violent; four million soldiers were sent home with little planning, little money, few benefits, and vague promises. A wartime bubble in prices of farmland burst, leaving many farmers deeply in debt after they purchased new land. Major strikes in the steel, coal, and meatpacking industries disrupted the economy in 1919. The country was also hit by the influenza pandemic, which killed over 600,000 Americans in 1918 and 1919. A massive agricultural price collapse was averted in 1919 in early 1920 through the efforts of Hoover's Food Administration, but prices dropped substantially in late 1920. After the expiration of wartime contracts in 1920, the economy plunged into a severe recession, and unemployment rose to 11.9%.

Following the October Revolution in the Russia, some in America feared the possibility of a Communist-inspired agitation. These fears were inflamed by the 1919 United States anarchist bombings, which were conducted by the anarchist Luigi Galleani and his followers. Fears over far-left subversion, combined with a patriotic national mood, led to the "First Red Scare." Attorney General A. Mitchell Palmer convinced Wilson to delay amnesty for those who had been convicted of war-time sedition, and he launched the Palmer Raids to suppress radical organizations. Palmer's activities met resistance from the courts and from some senior federal officials, but Wilson, who was physically incapacitated by late 1919, was not told about the raids.

=== Civil rights ===
==== Segregated government offices ====
Historian Kendrick Clements argues that "Wilson had none of the crude, vicious racism of James K. Vardaman or Benjamin R. Tillman, but he was insensitive to African-American feelings and aspirations." Segregation of government offices and discriminatory hiring practices had been started by President Theodore Roosevelt and continued by President Taft, but the Wilson administration escalated the practice. In Wilson's first month in office, Postmaster General Albert S. Burleson brought up the issue of segregating workplaces in a cabinet meeting and urged the president to establish it across the government, in restrooms, cafeterias and work spaces. Treasury Secretary William G. McAdoo also permitted lower-level officials to racially segregate employees in the workplaces of those departments. Though Wilson did not issue an executive order regarding segregation, by the end of 1913 many departments, including the Navy, had segregated workspaces, restrooms, and cafeterias were segregated. During Wilson's term, the government also began requiring photographs of all applicants for federal jobs.

Ross Kennedy writes that Wilson's support of segregation complied with predominant public opinion, but his change in federal practices was protested in letters from both blacks and whites to the White House, mass meetings, newspaper campaigns and official statements by both black and white church groups. The president's African-American supporters, who had crossed party lines to vote for him in 1912, were bitterly disappointed, and they and Northern leaders protested the changes. Wilson defended his administration's segregation policy in a July 1913 letter responding to Oswald Garrison Villard, publisher of the New York Evening Post and founding member of the NAACP; Wilson suggested the segregation removed "friction" between the races.

==== Segregation in the military ====
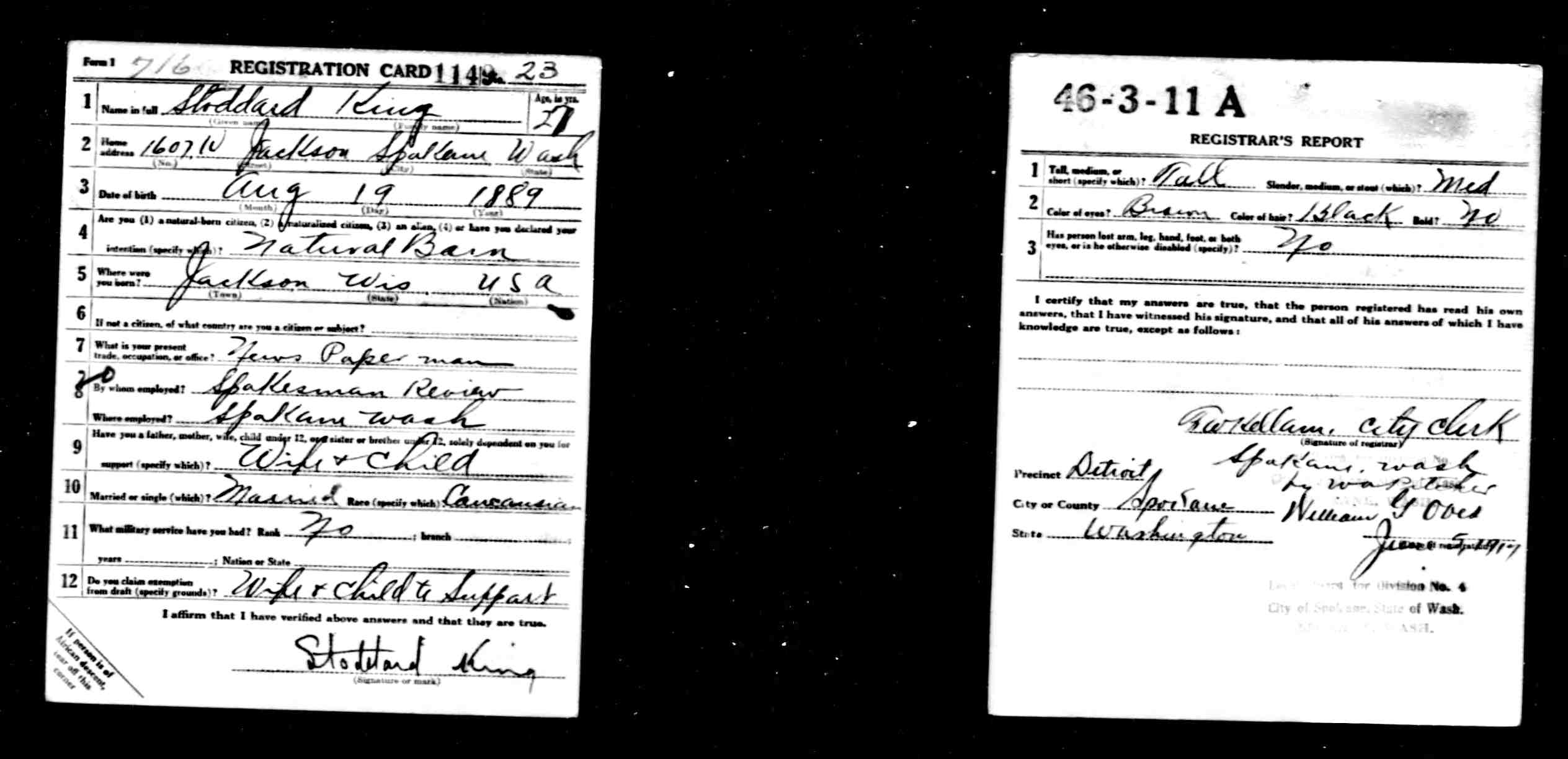
World War I draft card, the lower left corner to be removed by men of African background to help keep the military segregated

While segregation had been present in the army prior to Wilson, its severity increased significantly under him. During Wilson's first term, the army and navy refused to commission new black officers. Black officers already serving experienced increased discrimination and were often forced out or discharged on dubious grounds. In 1917–1918 the War Department drafted hundreds of thousands of blacks into the army, and draftees were paid equally regardless of race. Commissioning of African-Americans officers resumed but units remained segregated and most all-black units were led by white officers.

Unlike the Army, the U.S. Navy had never been formally segregated. Following Wilson's appointment of Josephus Daniels as Secretary of the Navy, a system of Jim Crow was swiftly implemented with ships, training facilities, restrooms, and cafeterias all becoming segregated. While Daniels significantly expanded opportunities for advancement and training available to white sailors, African-American sailors were relegated almost entirely to mess and custodial duties, often assigned to act as servants for white officers.

Hundreds of thousands of blacks were drafted into the wartime Army, and given equal pay with whites. However, in accord with military policy from the Civil War through the Second World War, the army kept African-American soldiers in all-black units with white officers, and the great majority of black units were kept out of combat. When a delegation of blacks protested the discriminatory actions, Wilson told them "segregation is not a humiliation but a benefit, and ought to be so regarded by you gentlemen." In 1918, W. E. B. Du Bois—a leader of the NAACP who had campaigned for Wilson believing he was a "liberal southerner"—was offered an army commission in charge of dealing with race relations; DuBois accepted, but he failed his army physical and did not serve. By 1916, Du Bois opposed Wilson, charging that his first term had seen "the worst attempt at Jim Crow legislation and discrimination in civil service that [blacks] had experienced since the Civil War."

==== Race riots and lynchings ====
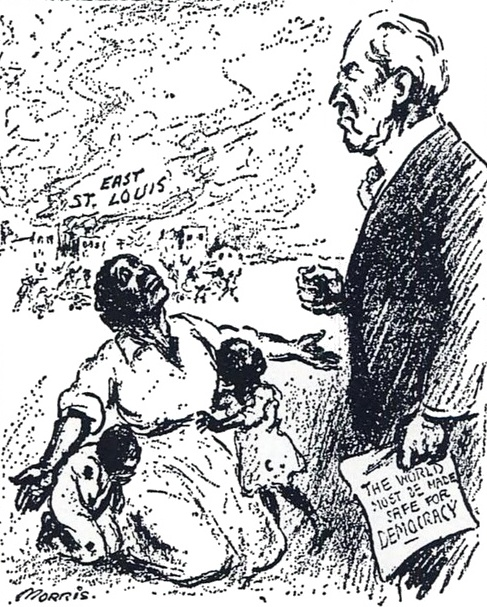
Editorial cartoon by William Charles Morris in New York Evening Mail about the East St. Louis riot of 1917. The caption reads, "Mr. President, why not make America safe for democracy?", referring to Wilson's war message, "The world must be made safe for democracy."

The Great Migration of African Americans out of the South surged in 1917 and 1918. There was a severe shortage of housing in centers of war industry. Race riots erupted—the worst was the East St. Louis riots of July 1917 which killed 29 blacks and 9 whites and caused $1.4 million in property damage. Wilson asked Attorney General Thomas Watt Gregory if the federal government could intervene to "check these disgraceful outrages." However, on the advice of Gregory, Wilson did not take direct action against the riots.

Lynchings against individual blacks averaged about one a week across the South. After consulting with African-American leader Robert Moton, Wilson issued a major statement denouncing lynching. He called upon governors and law-enforcement officers to "stamp out this disgraceful evil" of lynch mobs. He denounced the mob spirit of lynching as a blow against liberty and justice. He further stated, "I say plainly that every American who takes part in the action of mob or gives it any sort of continence is no true son of this great democracy but its betrayer, and ...[discredits] her by that single disloyalty to her standards of law and of rights."

In 1919, another series of race riots occurred in Washington D.C., Chicago, Omaha, Elaine, and two dozen other cities across the country. Historians estimate more than 250 African Americans were killed. At the request of state governors, The War Department sent Army troops to the worst-hit cities. Wilson ignored the crisis.

== Foreign policy ==
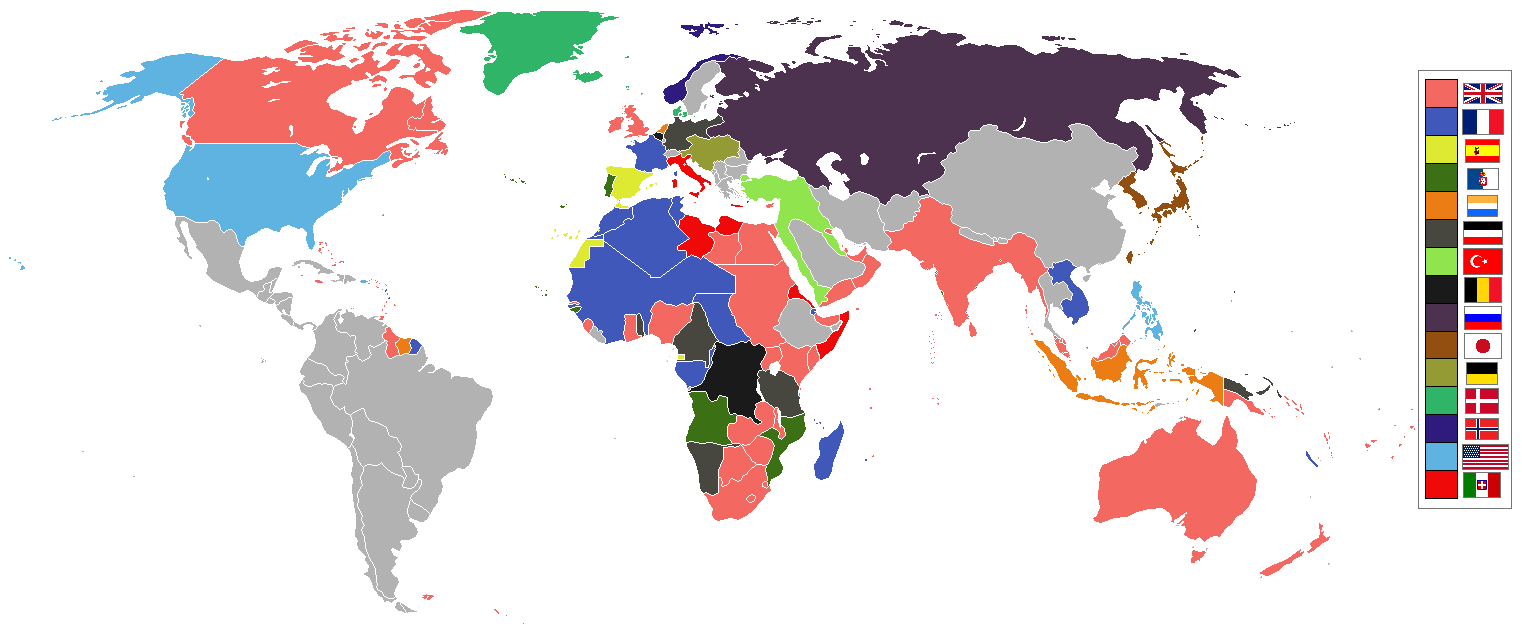
Map showing control by the main powers at start of 1914

Wilson had not traveled much abroad, but he was a deep student of British political and constitutional history, and was well read in European history. Contacts with Presbyterian missionaries over the years brought him much detailed localized information about conditions in China and other missionary locales.

=== Liberal internationalism ===
Wilson's foreign policy was based on an idealistic approach to liberal internationalism that sharply contrasted with realist conservative nationalism of Taft, Roosevelt, and William McKinley. Since 1900, the consensus of Democrats had, according to Arthur Link:

consistently condemned militarism, imperialism, and interventionism in foreign policy. They instead advocated world involvement along liberal-internationalist lines. Wilson's appointment of William Jennings Bryan as Secretary of State indicated a new departure, for Bryan had long been the leading opponent of imperialism and militarism and a pioneer in the world peace movement.

Bryan took the initiative in asking 40 countries with ambassadors in Washington to sign bilateral arbitration treaties. Any dispute of any kind with the United States would lead to a one-year cooling-off period, and submission to an international commission for arbitration. Thirty countries signed, but not Mexico and Colombia (which had grievances with Washington), nor Japan, Germany, Austria-Hungary, or the Ottoman Empire. Some European diplomats signed the treaties, but considered them irrelevant.

Diplomatic historian George C. Herring says that Wilson's idealism was genuine, but that it had blind spots:

Wilson's genuine and deeply felt aspirations to build a better world suffered from a certain culture-blindness. He lacked experience in diplomacy and hence an appreciation of its limits. He had not traveled widely outside the United States and knew little of other peoples and cultures beyond Britain, which he greatly admired. Especially in his first years in office, he had difficulty seeing that well-intended efforts to spread U.S. values might be viewed as interference at best, coercion at worst. His vision was further narrowed by the terrible burden of racism, common among the elite of his generation, which limited his capacity to understand and respect people of different colors. Above all, he was blinded by his certainty of America's goodness and destiny.

=== Latin America ===
Wilson sought closer relations with Latin America, and he hoped to create a Pan-American organization to arbitrate international disputes. He also negotiated a treaty with Colombia that would have paid that country an indemnity for the U.S. role in the secession of Panama, but the Senate defeated this treaty. However, Wilson frequently intervened in Latin American affairs, saying in 1913: "I am going to teach the South American republics to elect good men." The Dominican Republic had been a de facto American protectorate since Roosevelt's presidency, but suffered from instability. In 1916, Wilson sent troops to occupy the island, and the soldiers remained until 1924. In response to the assassination of the Haitian President, the U.S. intervened in Haiti in 1915 (the occupation would last until 1934). Wilson also authorized military interventions in Cuba, Panama, and Honduras. The 1914 Bryan–Chamorro Treaty converted Nicaragua into another de facto protectorate, and the U.S. stationed soldiers there throughout Wilson's presidency.

At first President Wilson and Secretary of State Bryan were determined to stay out of Cuban affairs. The political turmoil continued. Cuba joined in the war against Germany, and prospered from American contracts. US Marines were stationed to protect the major sugar plantations in the Sugar Intervention. However, in 1919 political chaos again threatened the Civil War and Secretary of State Lansing sent General Enoch Crowder to stabilize the situation.

The Panama Canal opened in 1914, just after the start of the World War. It fulfilled the long-term dream of building a canal across Central America and making possible quick movement between the Atlantic and the Pacific. The canal provided quick passage between the Pacific Ocean with the Atlantic Ocean, presenting new opportunities to the shippers and allowing the Navy to quickly transfer warships between the two oceans. In 1916, the US purchased the Danish West Indies for $25 million from Denmark and renamed the territory as the United States Virgin Islands.

==== Mexican Revolution ====
Apart from the World War, Mexico was the main focus of Wilson's foreign policy. Wilson took office during the intensely violent Mexican Revolution, which had begun in 1911 after liberals overthrew the military dictatorship of Porfirio Díaz. Shortly before Wilson took office, conservatives retook power through a coup led by Victoriano Huerta. Wilson rejected the legitimacy of Huerta's "government of butchers" and demanded Mexico hold democratic elections. Wilson's unprecedented approach meant no recognition and doomed Huerta's prospects for establishing a stable government. After Huerta arrested U.S. Navy personnel who had accidentally landed in a restricted zone near the northern port town of Tampico, Wilson dispatched the Navy to occupy the Mexican port city of Veracruz. A strong backlash against the American intervention among Mexicans of all political affiliations convinced Wilson to abandon his plans to expand the U.S. military intervention, but the intervention nonetheless helped convince Huerta to flee from the country. A group led by Venustiano Carranza established control over a significant proportion of Mexico, and Wilson recognized Carranza's government in October 1915.

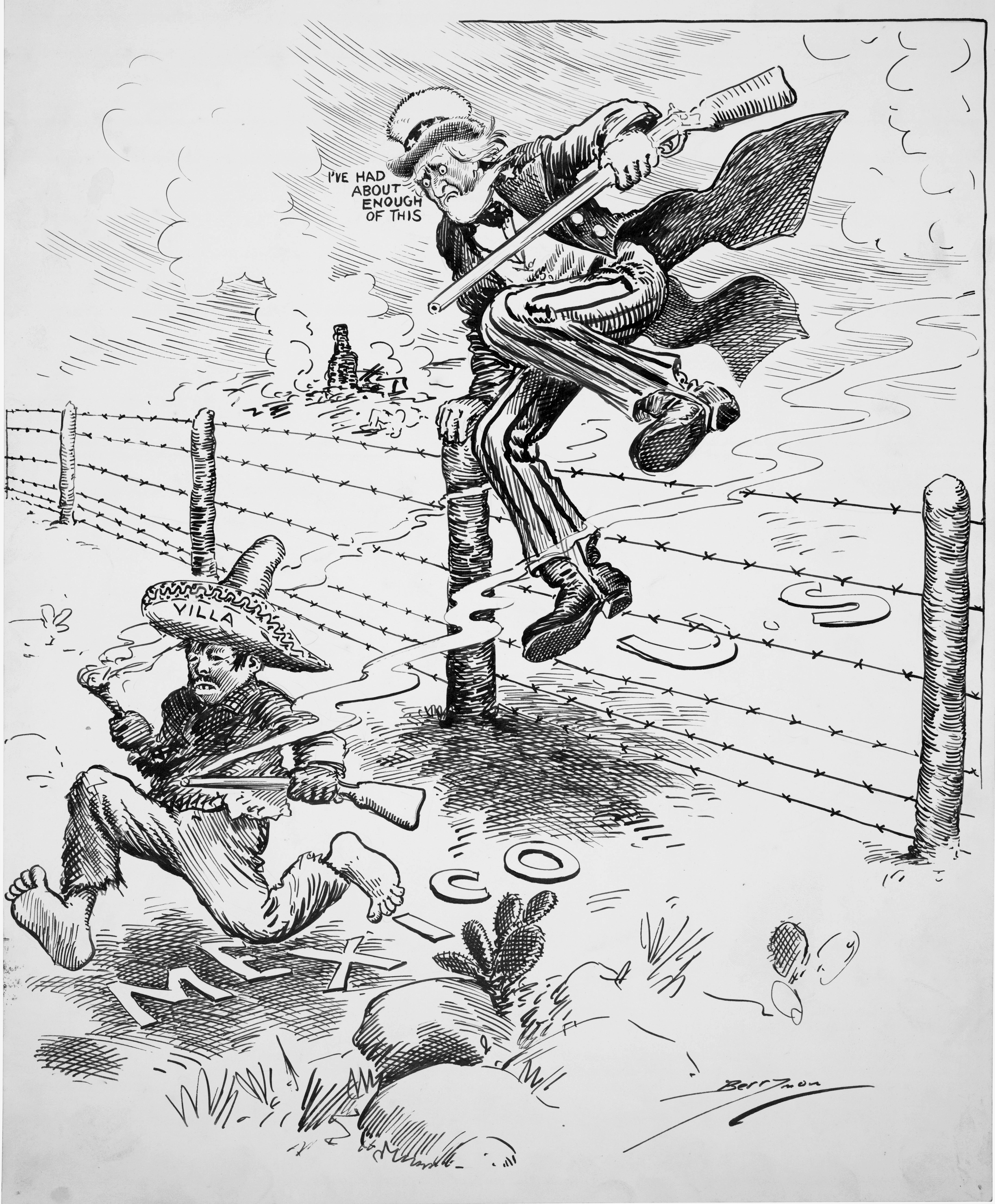
Editorial Cartoon by Clifford Berryman reflects American eagerness to capture a villain.

===== Pancho Villa Expedition =====
Carranza continued to face various opponents within Mexico, including regional warlord Pancho Villa. In early 1916, Pancho Villa raided an American town in New Mexico, killing or wounding dozens of Americans and sparking an angry popular demand for his punishment. Wilson ordered General John J. Pershing and 4000 troops across the border to capture Villa. By April, Pershing's forces had broken up and dispersed Villa's bands, but Villa remained on the loose and Pershing continued his pursuit deep into Mexico. Carranza then pivoted against the Americans and accused them of a punitive invasion; a confrontation with a mob in Parral on April 12 resulted in two dead Americans and six wounded, plus hundreds of Mexican casualties. Further incidents led to the brink of war by late June, when Wilson demanded an immediate release of American soldiers held prisoner. The prisoners were released, tensions subsided, and bilateral negotiations began under the auspices of the Mexican-American Joint High Commission. Eager to withdraw from Mexico and focus on the World War, Wilson ordered Pershing to withdraw, and the last American soldiers left in February 1917. According to historian Arthur Link, Carranza's successful handling of the American intervention in Mexico left the country free to develop its revolution without American pressure. Linda Hall and Don M. Coerver argue that the disappointment in not capturing Villa was minor compared to the public support for military preparedness engendered by the operation. It provided much-needed training and experience, especially regarding logistics, for the inexperienced Army and National Guard's troops. It made Pershing a national hero and put him in line for the top command.

=== Neutrality in World War I ===
World War I broke out in July 1914, pitting the Central Powers (Germany, Austria-Hungary, the Ottoman Empire, and Bulgaria) against the Allied Powers (Great Britain, France, Russia, and several other countries). The war fell into a long stalemate after the German advance was halted in September 1914 before it reached Paris. It then became a stalemate on the Western Front, with very high casualties on both sides. From 1914 until early 1917, Wilson's primary objectives were to protect America's neutral rights and to mediate a peace. Wilson insisted that all government actions be neutral, and that the belligerents must respect that neutrality according to the norms of international law. After the war began, Wilson told the Senate that the United States, "must be impartial in thought as well as in action, must put a curb upon our sentiments as well as upon every transaction that might be construed as a preference of one party to the struggle before another." He was ambiguous whether he meant the United States as a nation or meant all Americans as individuals. Wilson personally believed that the U.S. shared more values with the Allies than the Central Powers.

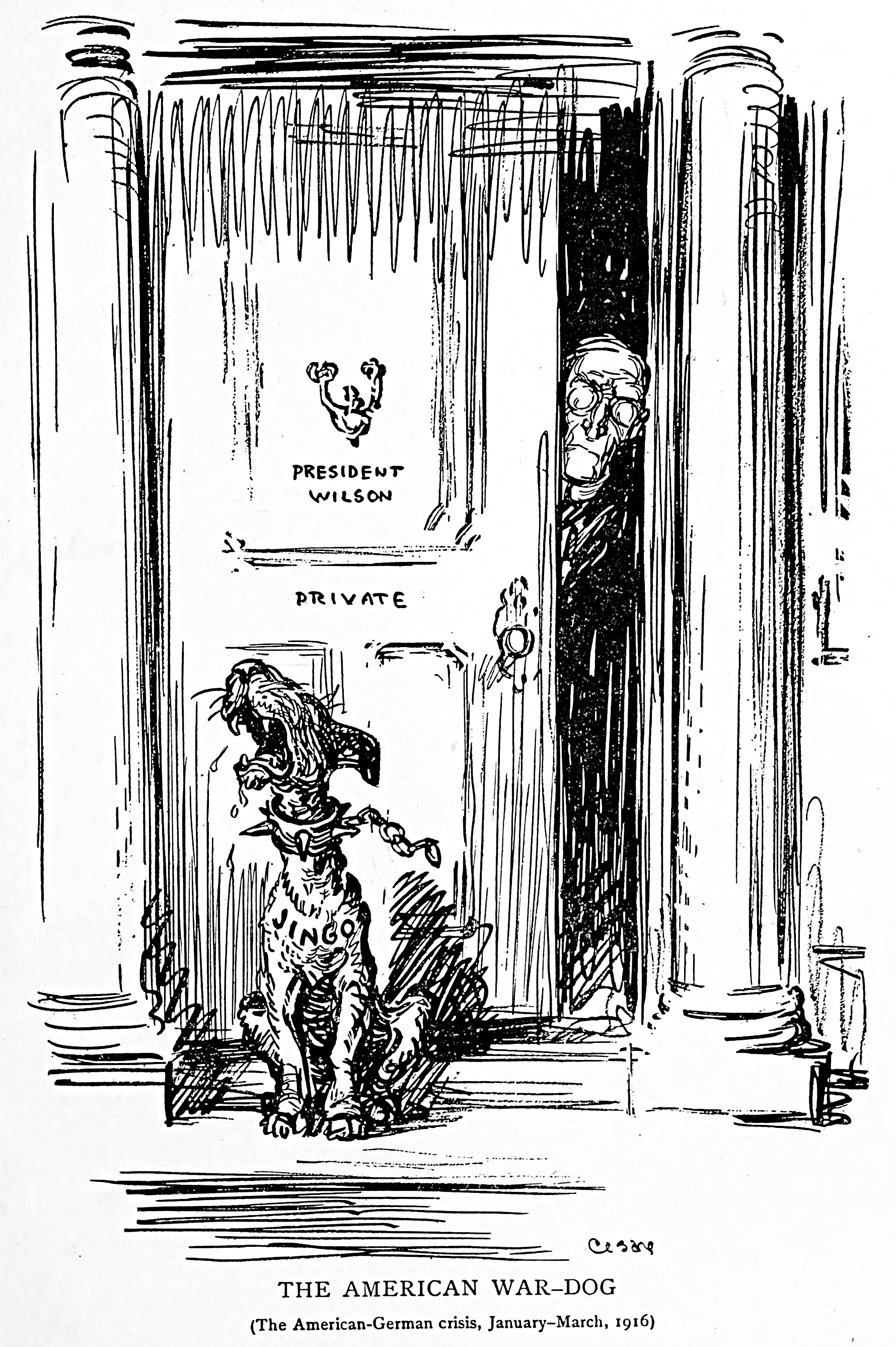
Wilson and "Jingo", the American War Dog. The editorial cartoon ridicules jingoes baying for war.

Wilson and House sought to position the United States as a mediator in the conflict, but European leaders rejected Houses's offers to help end the conflict. At the urging of Bryan, Wilson also discouraged American companies from extending loans to belligerents. The policy hurt the Allies more than the Central Powers, since the Allies were more dependent on American goods. The administration relaxed the policy of discouraging loans in October 1914 and then ended it in October 1915 due to fears about the policy's effect on the American economy. The United States sought to trade with both the Allied Powers and the Central Powers, but the British attempted to impose a Blockade of Germany, and, after a period of negotiations, Wilson essentially assented to the British blockade. The U.S. had relatively little direct trade with the Central Powers, and Wilson was unwilling to wage war against Britain over trade issues. The British also made their blockade more acceptable to American leaders by buying, rather than seizing without compensation, intercepted goods. Many Germans viewed American trade with the Allies as decidedly unneutral.

==== Growing tensions ====
In response to the British blockade of the Central Powers, the Germans launched a submarine campaign against merchant vessels in the seas surrounding the British Isles. Wilson strongly protested the policy, which had a much stronger effect on American trade than the British blockade. In the March 1915 Thrasher Incident, the British merchant ship Falaba was sunk by a German submarine with the loss of 111 lives, including one American. In early 1915, a German bomb struck an American ship, the Cushing, and a German submarine torpedoed an American tanker, the Gulflight. Wilson took the view, based on some reasonable evidence, that both incidents were accidental, and that a settlement of claims could be postponed to the end of the war. A German submarine torpedoed and sank the British ocean liner RMS Lusitania in May 1915; over a thousand perished, including many Americans. Wilson did not call for war; instead he said, "There is such a thing as a man being too proud to fight. There is such a thing as a nation being so right that it does not need to convince others by force that it is right". He realized he had chosen the wrong words when critics lashed out at his rhetoric. Wilson sent a protest to Germany which demanded that the German government "take immediate steps to prevent the recurrence" of incidents like the sinking of the Lusitania. In response, Bryan, who believed that Wilson had placed the defense of American trade rights above neutrality, resigned from the cabinet.

The White Star liner the SS Arabic was torpedoed in August 1915, with two American casualties. The U.S. threatened a diplomatic break unless Germany repudiated the action. The Germans agreed to warn unarmed merchant ships before attacking them. In March 1916, the SS Sussex, an unarmed ferry under the French flag, was torpedoed in the English Channel and four Americans were counted among the dead; the Germans had flouted the post-Lusitania exchanges. Wilson drew praise when he succeeded in wringing from Germany a pledge to constrain submarine warfare to the rules of cruiser warfare. This was a clear departure from existing practices—a diplomatic concession from which Germany could only more brazenly withdraw. In January 1917, the Germans initiated a new policy of unrestricted submarine warfare against ships in the seas around the British Isles. German leaders knew that the policy would likely provoke U.S. entrance into the war, but they hoped to defeat the Allied Powers before the U.S. could fully mobilize.

==== Preparedness ====
Military "preparedness", or building up the small army and navy—became a major dynamic of public opinion. New, well-funded organizations sprang up to appeal to the grassroots, including the American Defense Society (ADS) and the National Security League, both of which favored entering the war on the side of the Allies. Interventionists, led by Theodore Roosevelt, wanted war with Germany and attacked Wilson's refusal to build up the U.S. Army in anticipation of war. Wilson resistance to preparedness was partly due to the powerful anti-war element of the Democratic Party, which was led by Bryan. Anti-war sentiment was strong among many groups inside and outside of the party, including women, Protestant churches, labor unions, and Southern Democrats like Claude Kitchin, chairman of the powerful House Ways and Means Committee. Many liberal progressives especially in the Middle West strongly opposed preparedness and blamed Wall Street financiers and the profit=hungry munition makers for the preparedness movement and for trying to involve America in a needless war to benefit only Great Britain. Wilson denounced the "little group of willful men" who were unable to stop a declaration of war. But in 1919 they did block the League of Nations treaty because it further entangled America in foreign relationships with distasteful countries, and turned over decisions to international bodies that belonged in Washington. John Blum says:

Wilson's long silence about preparedness had permitted such a spread and such a hardening of antipreparedness attitudes within his party and across the nation that when he came [at last] to his task, neither Congress to the country was amenable to much persuasion.

After the 1915 sinking of the Lusitania and the resignation of Bryan, Wilson publicly committed himself to preparedness and began to build up the army and the navy. Wilson was constrained by America's traditional commitment to military nonintervention. Wilson believed that a massive military mobilization could only take place after a declaration of war, even though that meant a long delay in sending troops to Europe. Many Democrats felt that no American soldiers would be needed, only American money and munitions. Wilson had more success in his request for a dramatic expansion of the Navy. Congress passed a Naval Expansion Act in 1916 that encapsulated the planning by the Navy's professional officers to build a fleet of top-rank status, but it took several years to become operational.

=== World War I ===
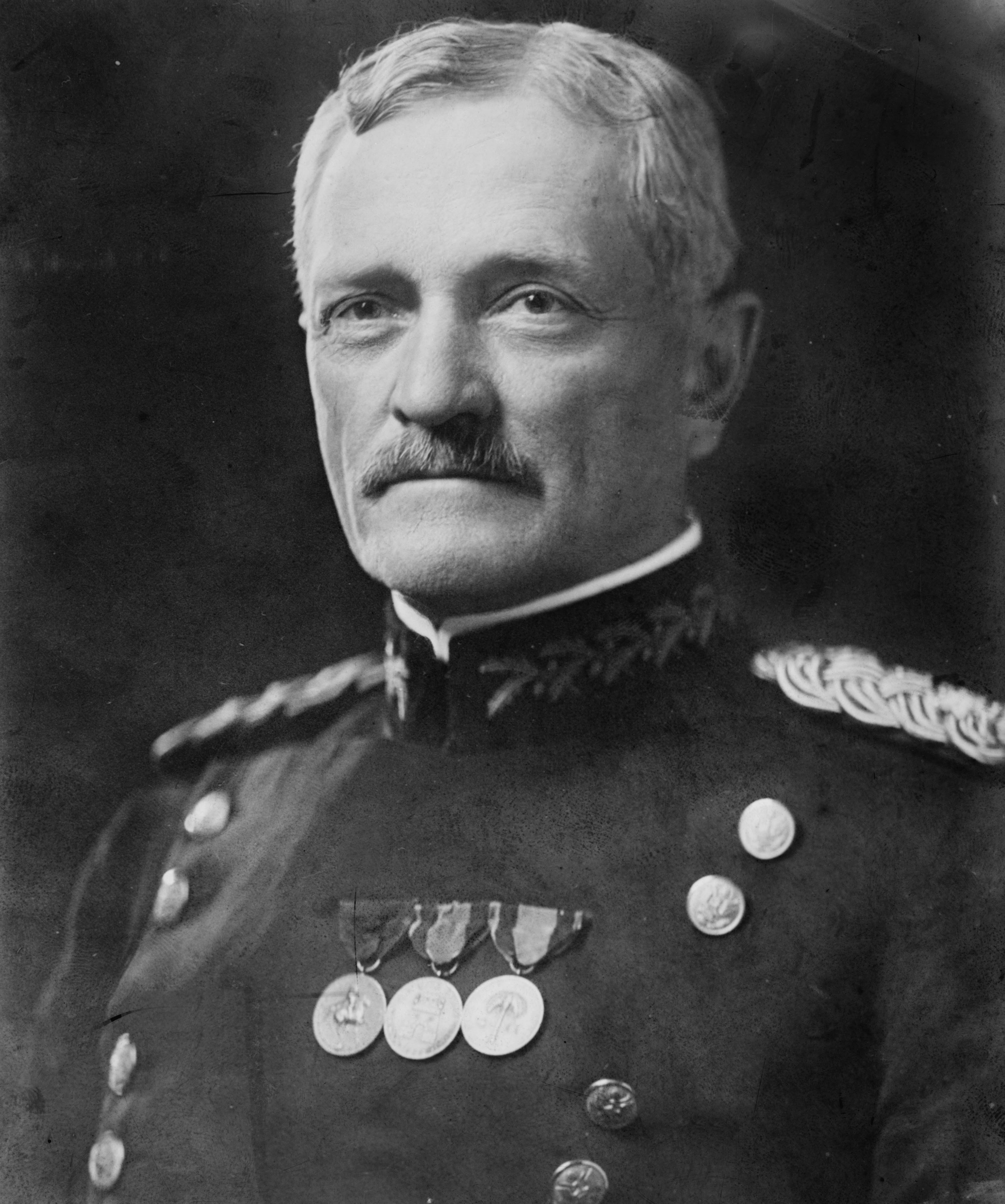
Gen. John J. Pershing

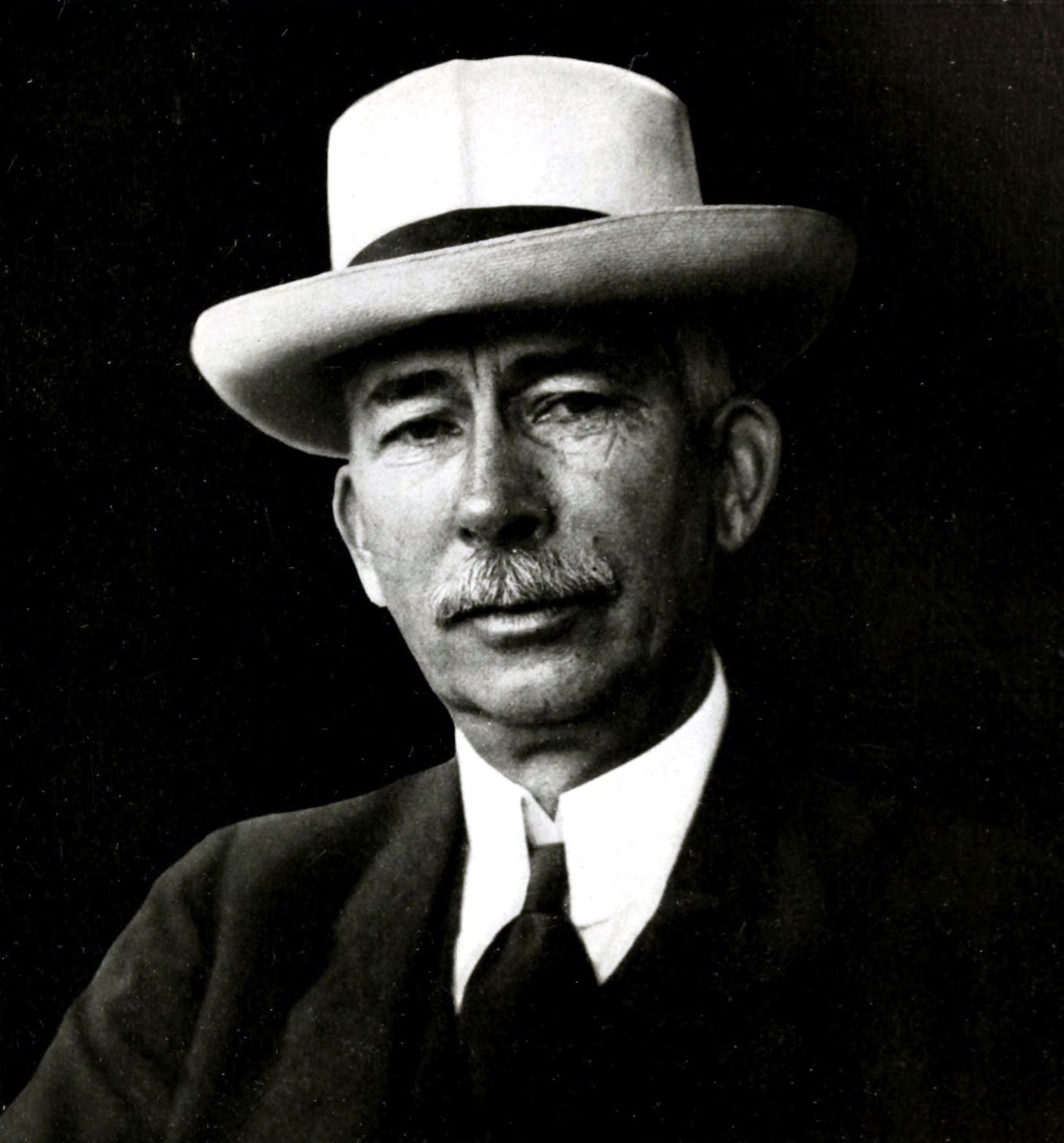
Colonel Edward M. House

==== Entering the war ====
In early 1917, German ambassador Johann von Bernstorf informed Secretary of State Lansing of Germany's commitment to unrestricted submarine warfare. In late February, the U.S. learned of the Zimmermann Telegram, a secret diplomatic communication in which Germany sought to convince Mexico to join it in a war against the United States. Wilson ended diplomatic relations with Germany. March 1917 brought the overthrow of the much hated tsarist rule in Russia. It removed a serious ideological barrier to America's entry into the war: now the Allies supported democracy and the Central powers opposed democracy and instead practiced autocracy and militarism. Germany then began sinking American merchant ships. Wilson held a Cabinet meeting on March 20; all members agreed that the time had come to enter the war.

Wilson addressed Congress on April 2, 1917, calling for a declaration of war against Germany. He argued that the Germans were engaged in "nothing less than war against the government and people of the United States." He asked for a military draft to raise the army, increased taxes to pay for military expenses, loans to Allied governments, and increased industrial and agricultural production. The declaration of war by the United States against Germany passed Congress by strong bipartisan majorities on April 6, 1917, with opposition from ethnic German strongholds and remote rural areas in the South. The United States also later declared war against Austria-Hungary in December 1917. The U.S. did not sign a formal alliance with Britain or France but operated as an "associated" power—an informal ally with military cooperation through the Supreme War Council in London.

Generals Frederick Funston and Leonard Wood had been contenders for the command of American army forces in Europe, but Funston died just weeks before the United States entered the war, and Wilson distrusted Wood, who was a close ally of Theodore Roosevelt. Wilson instead gave command to General John J. Pershing, who had led the expedition against Pancho Villa. Pershing would have complete authority as to tactics, strategy, and some diplomacy. Edward House became the president's main channel of communication with the British government, and William Wiseman, a British naval attaché, was House's principal contact in England. Their personal relationship succeeded in serving the powers well, by overcoming strained relations in order to achieve essential understandings between the two governments. House also became the U.S. representative on the Allies' Supreme War Council.

==== The Fourteen Points ====
Wilson sought the establishment of "an organized common peace" that would help prevent future conflicts. In this goal, he was opposed not just by the Central Powers, but also the other Allied Powers, who, to various degrees, sought to win concessions and oppose a punitive peace agreement on the Central Powers. He initiated a secret study group named The Inquiry, directed by Colonel House, to prepare for post-war negotiations. The Inquiry's studies culminated in a speech by Wilson to Congress on January 8, 1918, wherein he articulated America's long term war objectives. The speech, known as the Fourteen Points, was authored mainly by Walter Lippmann and projected Wilson's progressive domestic policies into the international arena. The first six points dealt with diplomacy, freedom of the seas, and settlement of colonial claims. Then territorial issues were addressed and the final point, the establishment of an association of nations to guarantee the independence and territorial integrity of all nations—a League of Nations. The address was translated into many languages for global dissemination.

Aside from post-war considerations, Wilson's Fourteen Points were motivated by several factors. Unlike some of the other Allied leaders, Wilson did not call for the total break-up of the Ottoman Empire or the Austro-Hungarian Empire. In offering a non-punitive peace to these nations as well as Germany, Wilson hoped to quickly began negotiations to end the war. Wilson's liberal pronouncements were also targeted at pacifistic and war-weary elements within the Allied countries, including the United States. Additionally, Wilson hoped to woo the Russians back into the war, although he failed in this goal.

==== Course of the war ====
With the U.S. entrance into the war, Wilson and Secretary of War Baker launched an expansion of the army, with the goal of creating a 300,000-member Regular Army, a 440,000-member National Guard, and a 500,000-member conscripted force known as the "National Army." Despite some resistance to conscription and to the commitment of American soldiers abroad, large majorities of both houses of Congress voted to impose conscription with the Selective Service Act of 1917. Seeking to avoid the draft riots of the Civil War, the bill established local draft boards that were charged with determining who should be drafted. By the end of the war, nearly 3 million men would be drafted. The Navy also saw tremendous expansion, and, at the urging of Admiral William Sims, focused on building anti-submarine vessels. Allied shipping losses dropped substantially due to U.S. contributions and a new emphasis on the convoy system.

The American Expeditionary Forces first arrived in France in mid-1917. Wilson and Pershing rejected the British and French proposal that American soldiers integrate into existing Allied units, giving the United States more freedom of action but requiring for the creation of new organizations and supply chains. There were only 175,000 American soldiers in Europe at the end of 1917, but by mid-1918 10,000 Americans were arriving in Europe per day. Russia exited the war after the March 1918 signing of the Treaty of Brest-Litovsk, allowing Germany to shift soldiers from the Eastern Front of the war. The Germans launched a Spring Offensive against the Allies that inflicted heavy casualties but failed to break the Allied line. Beginning in August, the Allies launched the Hundred Days Offensive that pushed back the exhausted German army.

By the end of September 1918, the German leadership no longer believed it could win the war. Recognizing that Wilson would be more likely to accept a peace deal from a democratic government, Kaiser Wilhelm II appointed a new government led by Prince Maximilian of Baden; Baden immediately sought an armistice with Wilson. In the exchange of notes, German and American leaders agreed to incorporate the Fourteen Points in the armistice; House then procured agreement from France and Britain, but only after threatening to conclude a unilateral armistice without them. Wilson ignored Pershing's plea to drop the armistice and instead demand an unconditional surrender by Germany. The Germans signed the Armistice of 11 November 1918, bringing an end to the fighting. Austria-Hungary had signed the Armistice of Villa Giusti eight days earlier, while the Ottoman Empire had signed the Armistice of Mudros in October.

=== Aftermath of World War I ===
==== Paris Peace Conference ====
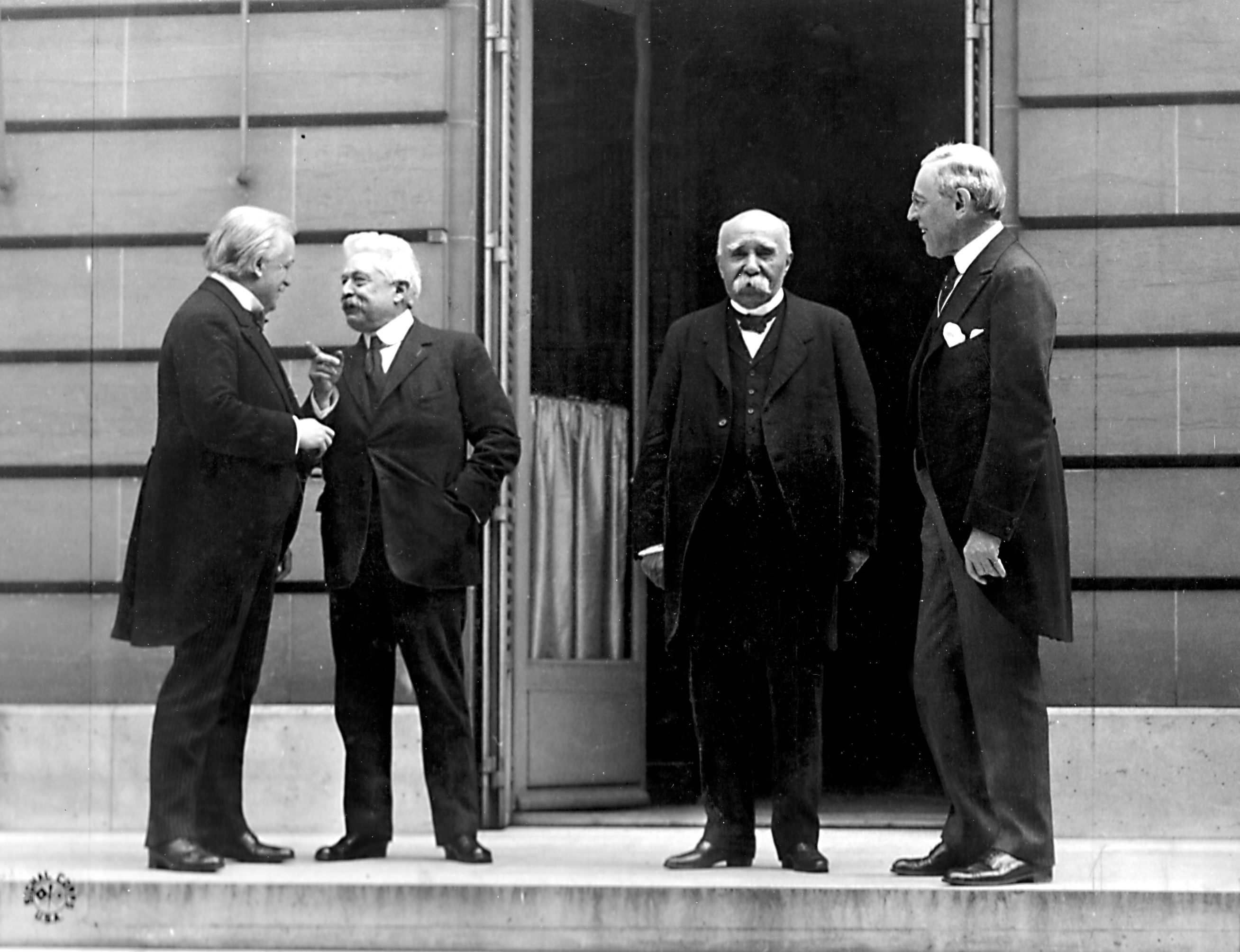
The "Big Four" at the Paris Peace Conference in 1919, following the end of World War I. Wilson is standing next to Georges Clemenceau at right.

After the signing of the armistice, Wilson traveled to Europe to attend the Paris Peace Conference, thereby becoming the first U.S. president to travel to Europe while in office. Save for a two-week return to the United States, Wilson remained in Europe for six months, where he focused on reaching a peace treaty to formally end the war. The defeated Central Powers had not been invited to the conference, and anxiously awaited their fate. Wilson proposed that the competing factions of the Russian Civil War declare a truce and send a joint delegation to the Paris Peace Conference, but other Allied leaders opposed the proposal and no delegation was sent. Wilson, British Prime Minister David Lloyd George, French Prime Minister Georges Clemenceau, and Italian Prime Minister Vittorio Emanuele Orlando made up the "Big Four", the Allied leaders with the most influence at the Paris Peace Conference. Though Wilson continued to advocate his idealistic Fourteen Points, many of the other allies desired revenge. Clemenceau especially sought onerous terms for Germany, while Lloyd George supported some of Wilson's ideas but feared public backlash if the treaty proved too favorable to the Central Powers.

Several new European states were established at the Paris Peace Conference

In pursuit of his League of Nations, Wilson conceded several points to the other powers present at the conference. France pressed for the dismemberment of Germany and the payment of a huge sum in war reparations. Wilson resisted these ideas, but Germany was still required to pay war reparations and subjected to military occupation in the Rhineland. Additionally, a clause in the treaty specifically named Germany as responsible for the war. Wilson agreed to the creation of mandates in former German and Ottoman territories, allowing the European powers and Japan to establish de facto colonies in the Middle East, Africa, and Asia. The Japanese acquisition of German interests in the Shandong Peninsula of China proved especially unpopular, as it undercut Wilson's promise of self-government. However, Wilson won the creation of several new states in Central Europe and the Balkans, including Poland, Yugoslavia, and Czechoslovakia, and the Austro-Hungarian Empire and the Ottoman Empire were partitioned. Wilson refused to concede to Italy's demands for territory on the Adriatic coast, leading to a dispute between Yugoslavia and Italy that was not settled until the signing of the 1920 Treaty of Rapallo. Japan proposed that the conference endorse a racial equality clause. Wilson was indifferent to the issue, but acceded to strong opposition from Australia and Britain.

The Covenant of the League of Nations was incorporated into the conference's Treaty of Versailles, which ended the war with Germany. Wilson himself presided over the committee that drafted the covenant, which bound members to oppose "external aggression" and to agree to peacefully settle disputes through organizations like the Permanent Court of International Justice. During the conference, former President Taft cabled to Wilson three proposed amendments to the League covenant which he thought would considerably increase its acceptability—the right of withdrawal from the League, the exemption of domestic issues from the League, and the inviolability of the Monroe Doctrine. Wilson very reluctantly accepted these amendments. In addition to the Treaty of Versailles, the Allies also wrote treaties with Austria (the Treaty of Saint-Germain-en-Laye), Hungary (the Treaty of Trianon), the Ottoman Empire (the Treaty of Sèvres), and Bulgaria (the Treaty of Neuilly-sur-Seine), all of which incorporated the League of Nations charter.

The conference finished negotiations in May 1919, at which point German leaders viewed the treaty for the first time. Some German leaders favored repudiating the treaty, but Germany signed the treaty on June 28, 1919. For his peace-making efforts, Wilson was awarded the 1919 Nobel Peace Prize. However, the defeated Central Powers protested the harsh terms of the treaty, and several colonial representatives pointed out the hypocrisy of a treaty that established new nations in Europe but allowed continued colonialism in Asia and Africa. Wilson also faced an uncertain domestic battle to ratify the treaty, as Republicans largely opposed it.

==== Treaty ratification debate ====
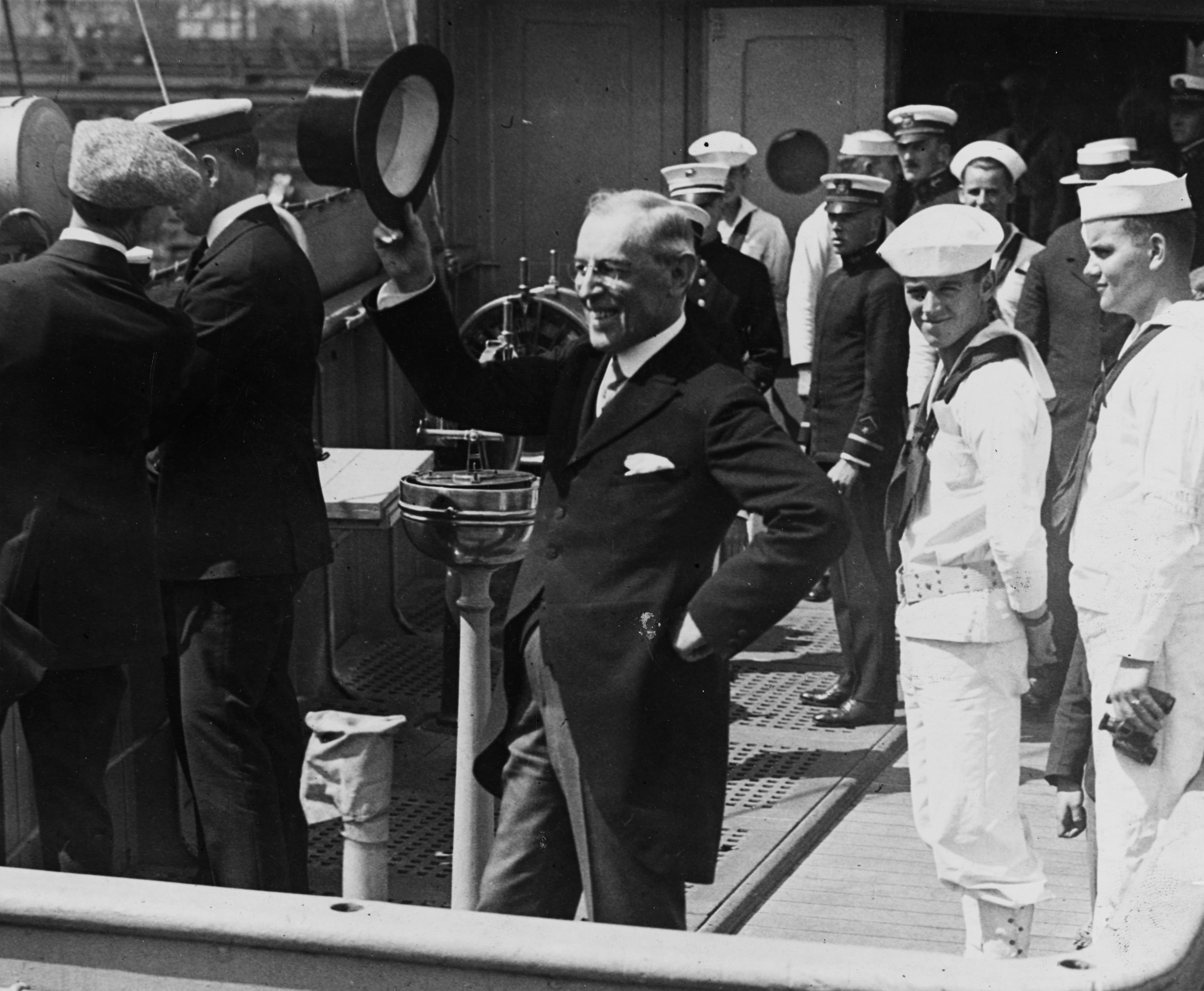
Wilson returning from the Versailles Peace Conference, 1919.

The chances were less than favorable for ratification of the treaty by a two-thirds vote of the Senate, in which Republicans held a narrow majority. Public opinion on the treaty was mixed, with intense opposition from most Republicans, Germans, and Irish Catholic Democrats. In numerous meetings with Senators, Wilson discovered opposition had hardened. Despite his weakened physical condition following the Paris Peace Conference, Wilson decided to barnstorm the Western states, scheduling 29 major speeches and many short ones to rally support. Wilson suffered a series of debilitating strokes and had to cut short his trip on in September 1919. He became an invalid in the White House, closely monitored by his wife, who insulated him from negative news and downplayed for him the gravity of his condition.

Senator Henry Cabot Lodge led the opposition to the treaty; he despised Wilson and hoped to humiliate him in the ratification battle. Republicans were outraged by Wilson's failure to discuss the war or its aftermath with them. An intensely partisan battle developed in the Senate, as Republicans opposed the treaty and Democrats largely supported it. The debate over the treaty centered around a debate over the American role in the world community in the post-war era, and Senators fell into three main groups. Most Democrats favored the treaty. Fourteen Senators, mostly Republicans, become known as the "irreconcilables", as they completely opposed U.S. entrance into the League of Nations. Some of these irreconcilables, such as George W. Norris, opposed the treaty for its failure to support decolonization and disarmament. Other irreconcilables, such as Hiram Johnson, feared surrendering American freedom of action to an international organization. Most sought the removal of Article X the League covenant, which purported to bind nations to defend each other against aggression. The remaining group of Senators, known as "reservationists", accepted the idea of the league, but sought varying degrees of change to the League to ensure the protection of U.S. sovereignty. Former President Taft and former Secretary of State Elihu Root both favored ratification of the treaty with some modifications, and their public support for the treaty gave Wilson some chance of winning significant Republican support for ratification.

Despite the difficulty of winning ratification, Wilson consistently refused to accede to reservations, partly due to concerns about having to re-open negotiations with the other powers if reservations were added. In mid-November 1919, Lodge and his Republicans formed a coalition with the pro-treaty Democrats to pass a treaty with reservations, but the seriously indisposed Wilson rejected this compromise and enough Democrats followed his lead to defeat ratification. Cooper and Bailey suggest that Wilson's stroke in September had debilitated him from negotiating effectively with Lodge. U.S. involvement in World War I did not formally end until the passage of the Knox–Porter Resolution in 1921.

==== Intervention in Russia ====
After Russia left World War I following the Bolshevik Revolution of 1917, the Allies sent troops there to prevent a German or Bolshevik takeover of weapons, munitions and other supplies previously shipped as aid to the pre-revolutionary government. Wilson loathed the Bolsheviks, who he believed did not represent the Russian people, but he feared that foreign intervention would only strengthen Bolshevik rule. Britain and France pressured him to intervene in order to potentially re-open a second front against Germany, and Wilson acceded to this pressure in the hope that it would help him in post-war negotiations and check Japanese influence in Siberia. The U.S. sent armed forces to assist the withdrawal of Czechoslovak Legions along the Trans-Siberian Railway, and to hold key port cities at Arkhangelsk and Vladivostok. Though specifically instructed not to engage the Bolsheviks, the U.S. forces engaged in several armed conflicts against forces of the new Russian government. Revolutionaries in Russia resented the United States intrusion. Robert Maddox wrote, "The immediate effect of the intervention was to prolong a bloody civil war, thereby costing thousands of additional lives and wreaking enormous destruction on an already battered society."

==== Other issues ====
In 1919, the Wilson administration acquiesced in the Balfour Declaration without supporting Zionism in an official way. Wilson expressed sympathy for the plight of Jews, especially in Poland and France.

In May 1920, the Wilson administration submitted a proposal to Congress to have the U.S. accept a mandate from the League of Nations to take over Armenia. Bailey notes this was opposed by American public opinion, and had the support of only 23 senators. Richard G. Hovannisian states that Wilson "made all the wrong arguments" for the mandate and focused less on the immediate policy than on how history would judge his actions: "[he] wished to place it clearly on the record that the abandonment of Armenia was not his doing."

=== List of international trips ===
Wilson made two international trips during his presidency. He was the first sitting president to travel to Europe. He spent nearly seven months in Europe after World War I (interrupted by a brief nine-day return stateside).

	Dates	Country	Locations	Details
1	December 14–25, 1918	France	Paris, Chaumont	Attended preliminary discussions prior to the Paris Peace Conference; promoted his Fourteen Points principles for world peace. Departed the U.S. December 4.
1	December 26–31, 1918	United Kingdom	London, Carlisle, Manchester	Met with Prime Minister David Lloyd George and King George V.
1	December 31, 1918 – January 1, 1919	France	Paris	Stopover en route to Italy.
1	January 1–6, 1919	Italy	Rome, Genoa, Milan, Turin	Met with King Victor Emmanuel III and Prime Minister Vittorio Orlando.
1	January 4, 1919	Vatican	Rome	Audience with Pope Benedict XV (the first meeting between a sitting president and a reigning pope).
1	January 7 – February 14, 1919	France	Paris	Attended Paris Peace Conference. Returned to the U.S. February 24.
2	March 14 – June 18, 1919	France	Paris	Attended Paris Peace Conference. Departed the U.S. March 5.
2	June 18–19, 1919	Belgium	Brussels, Charleroi, Malines, Louvain	Met with King Albert I. Addressed Parliament.
2	June 20–28, 1919	France	Paris	Attended Paris Peace Conference. Returned to the U.S. July 8.

== Incapacity, 1919–1921 ==
On October 2, 1919, Wilson suffered a serious stroke, leaving him paralyzed on his left side, and with only partial vision in the right eye. He was confined to bed for weeks and sequestered from everyone except his wife and his physician, Cary Grayson. Doctor Bert E. Park, a neurosurgeon who examined Wilson's medical records after his death, writes that Wilson's illness affected his personality in various ways, making him prone to "disorders of emotion, impaired impulse control, and defective judgment." In the months after the stroke, Wilson was insulated by his wife, who selected matters for his attention and delegated others to his cabinet. For the remainder of the Wilson presidency, Edith Wilson managed the office of the president, a role she later described as a "stewardship", as she determined which communications and matters of state were important enough to bring to the attention of the bedridden president. Wilson temporarily resumed a perfunctory attendance at cabinet meetings. His wife and his aide, Joe Tumulty, helped a journalist, Louis Seibold, present a false account of an interview with the supposedly alert president. Despite his condition, Wilson rarely considered resigning, and he continued to advocate ratification of the Treaty of Versailles and even planned to run again.

By February 1920, the president's true condition was publicly known. Many expressed qualms about Wilson's fitness for the presidency at a time when the League fight was reaching a climax, and domestic issues such as strikes, unemployment, inflation and the threat of Communism were ablaze. No one close to Wilson was willing to take responsibility to certify—as required by the Constitution—his "inability to discharge the powers and duties of said office". Though some members of Congress encouraged Vice President Marshall to assert his claim to the presidency, Marshall never attempted to replace Wilson. Wilson's lengthy period of incapacity while serving as president was unprecedented. Of the previous presidents, only James Garfield had been in a similar predicament, but there were no such secrets about the situation. In addition, Garfield retained greater control of his mental faculties and did not face pressing issues.

== Elections during the Wilson presidency ==
=== Midterm elections of 1914 ===
In Wilson's first mid-term elections, Republicans picked up sixty seats in the House, but failed to re-take the chamber. In the first Senate elections since the passage of the Seventeenth Amendment, Democrats retained their Senate majority. Roosevelt's Bull Moose Party, which had won a handful of Congressional seats in the 1912 election, fared poorly, while conservative Republicans also defeated several progressive Republicans. The continuing Democratic control of Congress pleased Wilson, and he publicly argued that the election represented a mandate for continued progressive reforms. In the ensuing 64th Congress, Wilson and his allies passed several more laws, though none were as impactful as the major domestic initiatives that had been passed during Wilson's first two years in office.

=== Presidential election of 1916 ===
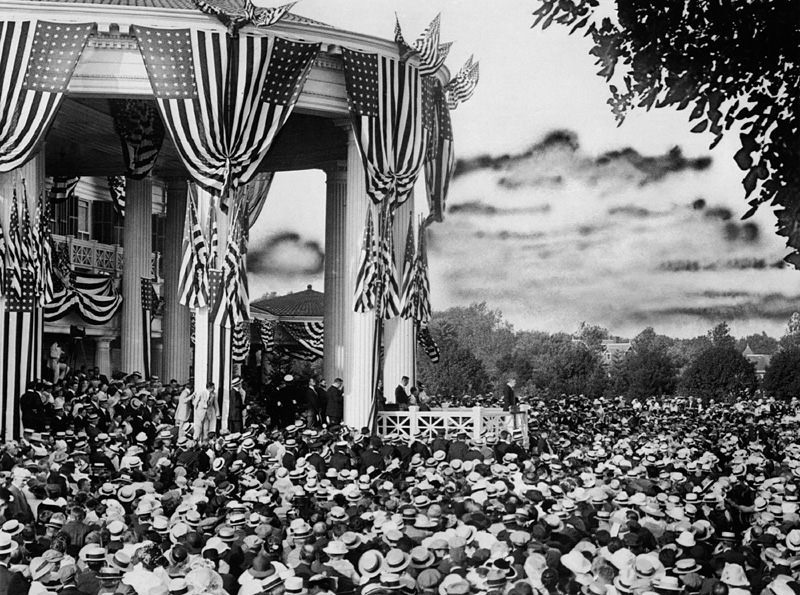
Wilson accepts the Democratic Party nomination, 1916

Wilson, renominated without opposition, employed his campaign slogan "He kept us out of war", though he never promised unequivocally to stay out of the war. In his acceptance speech on September 2, 1916, Wilson pointedly warned Germany that submarine warfare resulting in American deaths would not be tolerated, saying "The nation that violates these essential rights must expect to be checked and called to account by direct challenge and resistance. It at once makes the quarrel in part our own." Vance C. McCormick, a leading progressive, became chairman of the party, and Ambassador Henry Morgenthau was recalled from Turkey to manage campaign finances. Colonel House played an important role in the campaign. "He planned its structure; set its tone; helped guide its finance; chose speakers, tactics, and strategy; and, not least, handled the campaign's greatest asset and greatest potential liability: its brilliant but temperamental candidate."

1916 Electoral Vote Map

As the party platform was drafted, Senator Owen of Oklahoma urged Wilson to take ideas from the Progressive Party platform of 1912 "as a means of attaching to our party progressive Republicans who are in sympathy with us in so large a degree." At Wilson's request, Owen highlighted federal legislation to promote workers' health and safety, prohibit child labor, provide unemployment compensation and establish minimum wages and maximum hours. Wilson, in turn, included in his draft platform a plank that called for all work performed by and for the federal government to provide a minimum wage, an eight-hour day and six-day workweek, health and safety measures, the prohibition of child labour, and (his own additions) safeguards for female workers and a retirement program.

The 1916 Republican National Convention nominated Supreme Court Justice Charles Evans Hughes for president. A former governor of New York, Hughes sought to reunify the progressive and conservative wings of the party. Republicans campaigned against Wilson's New Freedom policies, especially tariff reduction, the implementation of higher income taxes, and the Adamson Act, which they derided as "class legislation." Republicans also attacked Wilson's foreign policy on various grounds, but domestic affairs generally dominated the campaign. As election day neared, both sides saw victory as a strong possibility.

The election outcome was in doubt for several days and was determined by several close states. Wilson won California by 3,773 of almost a million votes cast, and New Hampshire by 54 votes. Hughes won Minnesota by 393 votes out of over 358,000. In the final count, Wilson had 277 electoral votes vs. Hughes's 254. Wilson was able to win by picking up many votes that had gone to Teddy Roosevelt or Eugene V. Debs in 1912. He swept the Solid South and won all but a handful of Western states, while Hughes won most of the Northeastern and Midwestern states. By the time Hughes' concession telegram arrived, Wilson commented "it was a little moth-eaten when it got here". Wilson's re-election made him the first Democrat since Andrew Jackson to win two consecutive terms. Wilson's party also maintained control of Congress, although control in the House would depend on the support of several members of the Progressive Party.

=== Midterm elections of 1918 ===
Wilson involved himself in the 1918 Democratic congressional primaries, hoping to elect progressive members of Congress who would support his administration's foreign policies. Wilson succeeded in defeating several intra-party opponents, including Senator James K. Vardaman of Mississippi. However, the general elections saw Republicans take control of both the House and the Senate. Republicans ran against Wilson's foreign policy agenda, especially his proposal for the League of Nations.

=== Presidential election of 1920 ===
Republican nominee Warren G. Harding defeated Democratic nominee James Cox in the 1920 election

Despite his ill health, Wilson continued to entertain the possibility of running for a third term. Many of Wilson's advisers tried to convince him that his health precluded another campaign, but Wilson nonetheless asked Secretary of State Bainbridge Colby to nominate him for president at the 1920 Democratic National Convention. While the convention strongly endorsed Wilson's policies, Democratic leaders were unwilling to support the ailing Wilson for a third term. The convention held several ballots over multiple days, with McAdoo and Governor James Cox of Ohio emerging as the major contenders for the nomination. Though McAdoo had served as Secretary of the Treasury under Wilson, and had married Wilson's daughter in 1914, the president did not back McAdoo's candidacy due in part to McAdoo's perceived lukewarm support for the League of Nations. After dozens of ballots, the convention nominated a ticket consisting of Cox and Franklin D. Roosevelt, the Assistant Secretary of the Navy.

Many expected Theodore Roosevelt to be the 1920 Republican nominee, but his death in January 1919 left the race for the Republican nomination wide open. The three major contenders for the Republican nomination were General Leonard Wood, who had been a close friend of Roosevelt, Senator Hiram Johnson, who was Roosevelt's running mate on the 1912 Progressive ticket, and Governor Frank Lowden of Illinois. When the 1920 Republican National Convention met in June 1920, none of the three major contenders were able to accrue enough support to win the nomination, and party leaders put forward various favorite son candidates. The party ultimately nominated a dark horse candidate, Senator Warren G. Harding of Ohio. The Republicans centered their campaign around opposition to Wilson's policies, with Harding promising a "return to normalcy" to the conservative policies that had prevailed at the turn of the century. Wilson largely stayed out of the campaign, although he endorsed Cox and continued to advocate for U.S. membership in the League of Nations. Harding won a landslide victory, taking 60.3% of the popular vote and winning every state outside of the South. Democrats also suffered huge losses in the Congressional and gubernatorial elections of 1920, and the Republicans increased their majorities in both houses of Congress.

== Historical reputation ==
I am willing, no matter what my personal fortunes may be, to play for the verdict of mankind

Wilson is generally ranked by historians and political scientists as one of the better presidents. A 2018 poll of the American Political Science Association's Presidents and Executive Politics section ranked Wilson as the 10th best president. A 2017 C-SPAN poll of historians ranked Wilson as the 11th best president. However, a 2006 poll of historians ranked Wilson's unwillingness to compromise on the Treaty of Versailles as the fourth-worst mistake made by a sitting president.

In the view of some historians, Wilson, more than any of his predecessors, took steps towards the creation of a strong federal government that would protect ordinary citizens against the overwhelming power of large corporations. Many of Wilson's accomplishments, including the Federal Reserve, the Federal Trade Commission, the graduated income tax, and labor laws, continued to influence the United States long after Wilson's death. He is generally regarded as a key figure in the establishment of Modern American liberalism, and a strong influence on future presidents such as Franklin D. Roosevelt and Lyndon B. Johnson. Cooper argues that in terms of impact and ambition, only the New Deal and the Great Society rival the domestic accomplishments of Wilson's presidency. Wilson's idealistic foreign policy, which came to be known as Wilsonianism, also cast a long shadow over American foreign policy, and Wilson's League of Nations influenced the development of the United Nations. However, Wilson's record on civil rights has often been attacked. Wilson's administration saw a new level of segregation among the federal government, and Wilson's Cabinet included several racists.

Perhaps the harshest attack on Wilson's diplomacy comes from Stanford historian Thomas A. Bailey in two books that remain heavily cited by scholars, Woodrow Wilson and the Lost Peace (1944) and Woodrow Wilson and the Great Betrayal (1945), Bailey:

contended that Wilson's wartime isolationism, as well as his peace proposals at war's end, were seriously flawed. Highlighting the fact that American delegates encountered staunch opposition to Wilson's proposed League of Nations, Bailey concluded that the president and his diplomatic staff essentially sold out, compromising important American ideals to secure mere fragments of Wilson's progressive vision. Hence, while Bailey primarily targeted President Wilson in these critiques, others, including House, did not emerge unscathed.

Scot Bruce argues that:

More recently, prominent historians such as Thomas J. Knock, Arthur Walworth, and John Milton Cooper, among others, shied away from condemning Wilson and his peacemakers for extensive diplomatic failures in Paris. Instead, they framed Wilsonian progressivism, articulated through the League of Nations, as a comparatively enlightened framework tragically undermined by British and French machinations at the peace conference....Historian Margaret MacMillan, continued this analytical trend in her prize-winning book, Paris, 1919: Six Months That Changed the World (2001), which characterized Wilson as the frustrated idealist, unable to secure his progressive vision due to opposition from old-guard imperialists in his midst. While realists like Lloyd E. Ambrosius questioned the merits of defining Wilsonian progressivism too idealistically, the idea has persisted that well-intentioned U.S. delegates encountered staunch opposition to Wilson's proposals in Paris, and therefore compromised under pressure. Even the great Wilson scholar, Arthur S. Link, subscribed to a version of this narrative.
