= Revenue Act of 1918 =

The Revenue Act of 1918, 40 Stat. 1057, raised income tax rates over those established the previous year. The bottom tax bracket was expanded but raised from 2% to 6%.

The act simplified the tax structure created by the 1917 act. Instead of applying a "like normal tax" and a "like additional tax" to the 1916 act normal tax and additional tax it created a single tax structure with a Normal Tax and a Surtax.

The top rate was increased to 77%, and applied to income above $1,000,000. The top rate of the War Revenue Act of 1917 had taxed all income above $2,000,000 at a 67% rate.

The act was applicable to incomes for 1918. For 1919 and 1920 the top normal tax rate was reduced from 12 percent to 8%. This reduced the top marginal tax rate that combined normal tax and surtax from 77% to 73%.

Even in 1918, only 5% of the population paid federal income taxes (up from 1% in 1913), and yet the income tax funded one-third of the cost of World War I.

== Income Tax for Individuals ==
A Normal Tax and a Surtax were levied against the net income of individuals as shown in the following table.

Revenue Act of 1918; Income Tax on Individuals 40 Stat. 1062
Net Income (dollars)	Normal Rate for 1918 (percent)	Normal Rate for 1919, 1920 (percent)	Surtax Rate (percent)	Combined Rate for 1918 (percent)	Combined Rate for 1919, 1920 (percent)
0	6	4	0	6	4
4,000	12	8	0	12	8
5,000	12	8	1	13	9
6,000	12	8	2	14	10
8,000	12	8	3	15	11
10,000	12	8	4	16	12
12,000	12	8	5	17	13
14,000	12	8	6	18	14
16,000	12	8	7	19	15
18,000	12	8	8	20	16
20,000	12	8	9	21	17
22,000	12	8	10	22	18
24,000	12	8	11	23	19
26,000	12	8	12	24	20
28,000	12	8	13	25	21
30,000	12	8	14	26	22
32,000	12	8	15	27	23
34,000	12	8	16	28	24
36,000	12	8	17	29	25
38,000	12	8	18	30	26
40,000	12	8	19	31	27
42,000	12	8	20	32	28
44,000	12	8	21	33	29
46,000	12	8	22	34	30
48,000	12	8	23	35	31
50,000	12	8	24	36	32
52,000	12	8	25	37	33
54,000	12	8	26	38	34
56,000	12	8	27	39	35
58,000	12	8	28	40	36
60,000	12	8	29	41	37
62,000	12	8	30	42	38
64,000	12	8	31	43	39
66,000	12	8	32	44	40
68,000	12	8	33	45	41
70,000	12	8	34	46	42
72,000	12	8	35	47	43
74,000	12	8	36	48	44
76,000	12	8	37	49	45
78,000	12	8	38	50	46
80,000	12	8	39	51	47
82,000	12	8	40	52	48
84,000	12	8	41	53	49
86,000	12	8	42	54	50
88,000	12	8	43	55	51
90,000	12	8	44	56	52
92,000	12	8	45	57	53
94,000	12	8	46	58	54
96,000	12	8	47	59	55
98,000	12	8	48	60	56
100,000	12	8	52	64	60
150,000	12	8	56	68	64
200,000	12	8	60	72	68
300,000	12	8	63	75	71
500,000	12	8	64	76	72
1,000,000	12	8	65	77	73

- Exemption of $1,000 for single filers and $2,000 for married couples and head of family; $200 exemption for each dependent under 18.

== Inflation-adjusted numbers ==
Corrected for inflation by CPI:

1918 dollars	2005 dollars
$1,000,000	$12,933,775
$2,000,000	$25,867,550
