= Revenue Act of 1916 =

- Long title: An Act To increase the revenue, and for other purposes.
- Enacted by: the 64 United States Congress
- Effective: September 9, 1916

Citations
- Public law: Pub. L. 64–271
- Statutes at Large: 39 Stat. 756

Codification
- Acts amended: Revenue Act of 1913

Legislative history
- Introduced in the House as H.R. 16763; Passed the House on July 10, 1916; Passed the Senate on September 5, 1916

The United States Revenue Act of 1916, (ch. 463, 39 Stat. 756, September 8, 1916) raised the lowest income tax rate from 1% to 2% and raised the top rate to 15% on taxpayers with incomes above $2 million ($59.2 million in 2025 dollars). Previously, the top rate had been 7% on income above $500,000 ($14.8 million in 2025 dollars). The Act also instituted the federal estate tax.

The entry of the United States into World War I greatly increased the need for revenue.

An excess profits tax was introduced and the modern estate tax was imposed.

The act was applicable to incomes for 1916.

== Income Tax Table for Individuals ==
A Normal Tax and an Additional Tax were levied against the net income of individuals as shown in the following table.

Revenue Act of 1916; Normal Tax and Additional Tax on Individuals 39 Stat. 756
| Net Income (dollars) | Normal Rate (percent) | Additional Rate (percent) | Combined Rate (percent) |
| 0 | 2 | 0 | 2 |
| 20,000 | 2 | 1 | 3 |
| 40,000 | 2 | 2 | 4 |
| 60,000 | 2 | 3 | 5 |
| 80,000 | 2 | 4 | 6 |
| 100,000 | 2 | 5 | 7 |
| 150,000 | 2 | 6 | 8 |
| 200,000 | 2 | 7 | 9 |
| 250,000 | 2 | 8 | 10 |
| 300,000 | 2 | 9 | 11 |
| 500,000 | 2 | 10 | 12 |
| 1,000,000 | 2 | 11 | 13 |
| 1,500,000 | 2 | 12 | 14 |
| 2,000,000 | 2 | 13 | 15 |

- Exemption of $3,000 for single filers and $4,000 for married couples.
