= Child Labor Amendment =

Proposed U.S. Constitutional Amendment allowing Congress to regulate child labor

The Child Labor Amendment (CLA) is a proposed and still-pending amendment to the United States Constitution that would specifically authorize Congress to regulate "labor of persons under eighteen years of age". The amendment was proposed on June 2, 1924, following Supreme Court rulings in 1918 and 1922 that federal laws regulating and taxing goods produced by employees under the ages of 14 and 16 were unconstitutional.

The majority of the state legislatures ratified the amendment by the mid-1930s; however, it has not been ratified by the requisite three-fourths of the states according to Article V of the Constitution and none have ratified it since 1937. Interest in the amendment waned following the passage of the Fair Labor Standards Act of 1938, which implemented federal regulation of child labor, approved by the Supreme Court in 1941.

The amendment was itself the subject of a 1939 Supreme Court decision, Coleman v. Miller (307 U.S. 433), regarding its putative expiration. As Congress did not set a time limit for its ratification, the amendment is still pending before the states. Ratification by an additional 10 states would be necessary for this amendment to come into force. In recent years, lawmakers in a handful of states have introduced resolutions to ratify the amendment.

== Text ==
Section 1. The Congress shall have the power to limit, regulate, and prohibit the labor of persons under eighteen years of age.

Section 2. The power of the several States is unimpaired by this article except that the operation of State laws shall be suspended to the extent necessary to give effect to legislation enacted by the Congress.

== Background ==
The Child Labor Amendment came after a shifting perception in the United States of what was considered childhood at the turn of the century.

With the Keating–Owen Act of 1916, Congress had attempted to regulate interstate commerce involving goods produced by employees under the ages of 14 or 16, depending on the type of work. The Supreme Court found this law unconstitutional in Hammer v. Dagenhart (1918). Later that year, Congress attempted to levy a tax on businesses with employees under the ages of 14 or 16 (again depending on the type of work), which was struck down by the Supreme Court in Bailey v. Drexel Furniture (1922). It became apparent that a constitutional amendment would be necessary for such legislation to overcome the Court's objections.

== Legislative history ==
The amendment was offered by Ohio Republican Congressman Israel Moore Foster on April 26, 1924, during the 68th Congress, in the form of House Joint Resolution No. 184.

House Joint Resolution No. 184 was adopted by the House of Representatives on April 26, 1924, with a vote of 297 yeas, 69 nays, 2 absent and 64 not voting. It was then adopted by the Senate on June 2, 1924, with a vote of 61 yeas, 23 nays and 12 not voting. And with that, the proposed constitutional amendment was submitted to the state legislatures for ratification pursuant to Article V of the Constitution.

== Ratification history ==
Ratification status of the Child Labor Amendment Ratified the amendment Rejected the amendment

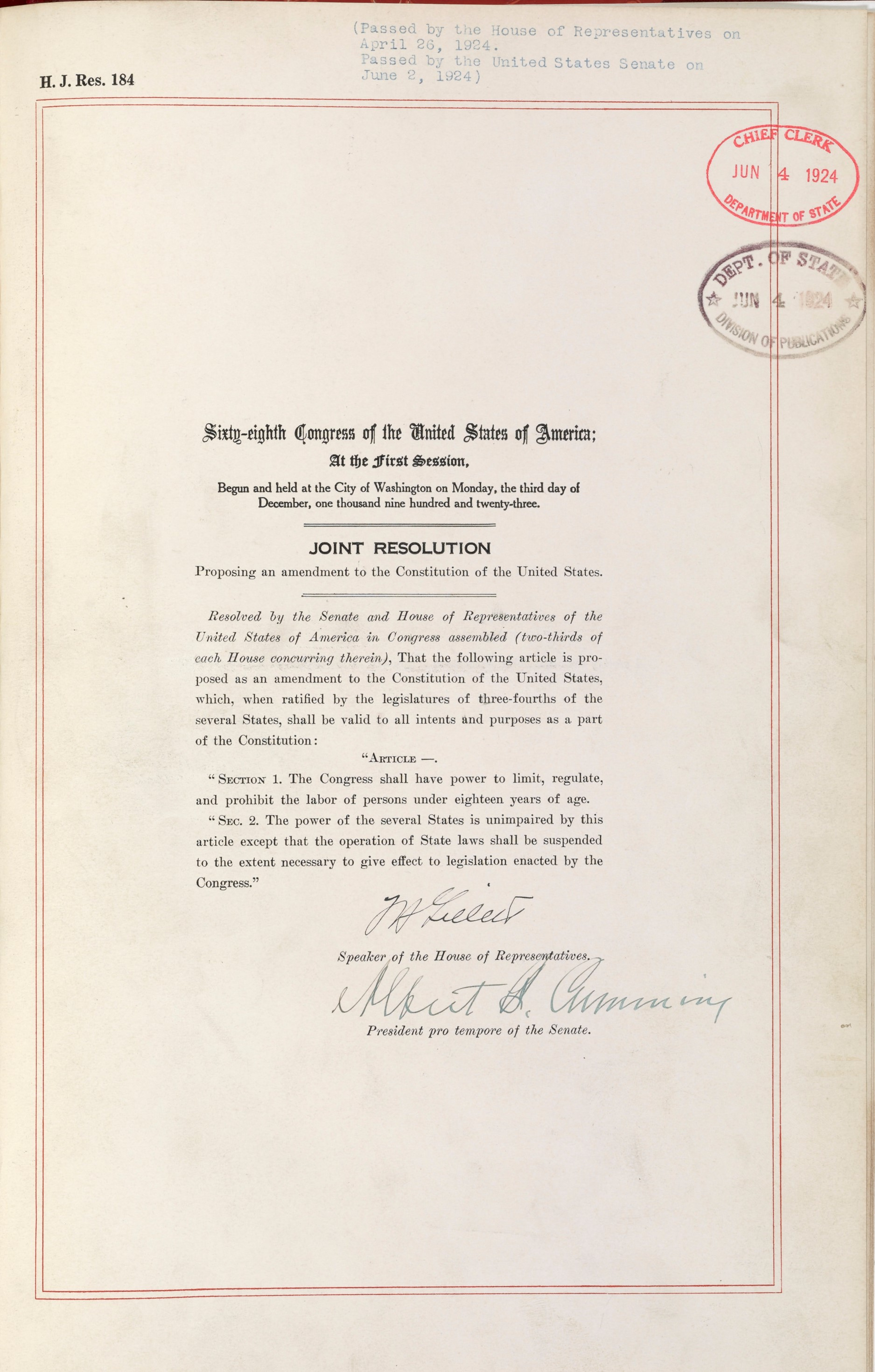
The Child Labor Amendment as passed by Congress

Having been approved by Congress, the proposed amendment was sent to the state legislatures for ratification and was ratified by the following 28 states:

1. Arkansas – June 28, 1924
2. California – January 8, 1925
3. Arizona – January 29, 1925
4. Wisconsin – February 25, 1925
5. Montana – February 11, 1927
6. Colorado – April 28, 1931
7. Oregon – January 31, 1933
8. Washington – February 3, 1933
9. North Dakota – March 4, 1933 (After State Senate rejection – January 28, 1925)
10. Ohio – March 22, 1933
11. Michigan – May 10, 1933
12. New Hampshire – May 17, 1933 (After rejection – March 18, 1925)
13. New Jersey – June 12, 1933
14. Illinois – June 30, 1933
15. Oklahoma – July 5, 1933
16. Iowa – December 5, 1933 (After State House rejection – March 11, 1925)
17. West Virginia – December 12, 1933
18. Minnesota – December 14, 1933 (After rejection – April 14, 1925)
19. Maine – December 16, 1933 (After rejection – April 10, 1925)
20. Pennsylvania – December 21, 1933 (After rejection – April 16, 1925)
21. Wyoming – January 31, 1935
22. Utah – February 5, 1935 (After rejection – February 4, 1925)
23. Idaho – February 7, 1935 (After State House rejection – February 7, 1925)
24. Indiana – February 8, 1935 (After State Senate rejection – February 5, 1925 and State House rejection – March 5, 1925)
25. Kentucky – January 13, 1937 (After rejection – March 24, 1926)
26. Nevada – January 29, 1937
27. New Mexico – February 12, 1937 (After rejection – 1935)
28. Kansas – February 25, 1937 (After rejection – January 30, 1925)

During the 1920s and 1930s, the following fifteen state legislatures rejected the Child Labor Amendment and did not subsequently ratify it:

1. Connecticut – February 11, 1925 (State Senate Rejection — February 5, 1925 and State House rejection – February 11, 1925)
2. Delaware – 1925 (State Senate and State House Rejection — January 28 1925)
3. Florida – 1925 (State Senate Rejection — April 15, 1925 and State House Rejection April 29, 1925)
4. Georgia – August 6, 1924
5. Louisiana – 1924, 1934 and 1936
6. Maryland – March 18, 1927
7. Massachusetts – Rejected by Voters in a referendum on November 4, 1924
8. Missouri – 1925 (State Senate Rejection — March 20, 1925 and State House Rejection — March 3, 1925)
9. North Carolina – August 23, 1924
10. South Carolina – 1925 (State Senate Rejection — January 27, 1925 and State House Rejection — January 21, 1925)
11. South Dakota – 1925, 1933 and 1937
12. Tennessee – 1925
13. Texas – 1925 (State Senate Rejection — January 26, 1925 and State House Rejection — January 27, 1925)
14. Vermont – 1925
15. Virginia – 1926

Although the act, on the part of state legislatures, of "rejecting" a proposed constitutional amendment has no legal recognition, such action does have political ramifications.

Of the 48 states in the Union during the 1920s and 1930s, two have taken no action of record on the amendment: Alabama and Rhode Island. Meanwhile in Nebraska, that state's Senate voted to ratify the CLA in 1929 (Nebraska's Legislature did not become unicameral until 1937). In Mississippi, that state's Senate voted to ratify the CLA in 1934. In New York, that state's Senate voted to ratify the CLA in 1937. And in 2024, the Connecticut House of Representatives voted to ratify the CLA. As to Alaska and Hawaii—both of which became states in 1959—the Hawaii Senate voted to ratify the CLA in 2021 and again in 2022.

=== Renewed ratification attempts and expressions of support ===
In 2021 and 2022, a concurrent resolution to ratify the Child Labor Amendment passed in the Hawaii Senate with bipartisan support but stalled in the Hawaii House of Representatives. In 2024, a resolution to ratify the amendment passed in the Connecticut House of Representatives but was not brought up for a vote in the Connecticut Senate. Since 2018, ratification resolutions have also been introduced in New York, Rhode Island, Nebraska, and Maryland, as was a resolution in Minnesota reaffirming that state's ratification from 1933.

In 2024, the New Hampshire House of Representatives adopted—without action of the New Hampshire Senate—a unicameral House Resolution reaffirming support for the 1933 ratification of the Child Labor Amendment by the full New Hampshire General Court which, despite its judicial sound, is the official name of New Hampshire's legislature. That unicameral House Resolution was formally received on November 14, 2024, by the United States Senate—as noted in the Congressional Record of that date—and was duly referred to the Senate's Committee on the Judiciary as reflected in the Record.

Supporters of ratification, such as University of San Diego School of Law professor Jessica Heldman and Los Angeles Times columnist Michael Hiltzik, have argued that the amendment could strengthen existing federal child labor protections, especially with some states loosening their child labor laws in recent years. Nebraska State Senator Carol Blood, who introduced a resolution to ratify the amendment, stated that it would only be "ratifying what is already in law", and making a statement that Nebraska "missed an opportunity to do better". In Connecticut, a ratification resolution was supported by the state's AFL-CIO chapter and other union leaders. The amendment is supported by the Child Labor Coalition.

Presently, there being 50 states in the Union, the amendment will remain inoperative unless it is ratified by the legislatures of an additional 10 states to reach the necessary threshold of approval by 38 state legislatures.

== Judicial history ==
Only five states adopted the amendment in the 1920s. Ten of the states initially balked, then re-examined their position during the 1930s and decided to ratify. These delayed decisions resulted in many controversies and resulted in the 1939 Supreme Court case Coleman v. Miller (307 U.S. 433) in which it was determined that the Child Labor Amendment remained pending before the state legislatures because the 68th Congress did not specify any deadline. The ruling also formed the basis of the unusual and belated ratification of the 27th Amendment which was proposed by Congress in 1789 and ratified more than two centuries later in 1992 by the legislatures of at least three-fourths of the 50 states.

The common legal opinion on federal child labor regulation reversed in the 1930s. Congress passed the Fair Labor Standards Act in 1938 regulating the employment of those under 16 or 18 years of age. The Supreme Court ruled unanimously in favor of that law in United States v. Darby Lumber Co. (1941), which overturned Hammer v. Dagenhart – one of the key decisions that had motivated the proponents of the Child Labor Amendment. After this shift, the amendment has been described as "moot" and lost the momentum that had once propelled it; hence, the movement for it has advanced no further.

If ever ratified by the required number of U.S. state legislatures, the Child Labor Amendment would repose in the Congress of the United States shared jurisdiction with the states to legislate on the subject of child labor.

== Opposition ==
In 1933, J. Gresham Machen, who was a major voice at the time for Evangelical Christian fundamentalism and conservative politics, delivered a paper called Mountains and Why We Love Them, which was read before a group of ministers in Philadelphia on November 27, 1933. In passing, Machen mentions the CLA and rhetorically asks "Will the so-called 'Child Labor Amendment' and other similar measures be adopted, to the destruction of all the decencies and privacies of the home?"

== See also ==
- List of amendments to the United States Constitution, amendments sent to the states, both ratified and unratified
- List of proposed amendments to the United States Constitution, amendments proposed in Congress but never sent to the states for ratification
