= St. Clair McKelway =

American journalist

- Born: February 13, 1905; Charlotte
- Died: January 10, 1980; New York City
- Occupations: Journalist, writer
- Father: Alexander McKelway

St. Clair McKelway (February 13, 1905 – January 10, 1980) was a writer and editor for The New Yorker magazine beginning in 1933.

== Childhood ==
McKelway was born in Charlotte, North Carolina, to Alexander McKelway, a Presbyterian minister, journalist, and child labor reformer, and Lavinia Rutherford Smith. In 1909 the senior McKelway took a job with the National Child Labor Committee (NCLC) and moved the family to Washington D.C. McKelway grew up in the Georgetown neighborhood and attended Western High School (now Duke Ellington School of the Arts).

== Career ==
He began his journalistic career at the Washington Herald before moving to New York City. He worked at the New York World and the New York Herald Tribune. While working at the New York Herald Tribune, he was described by Stanley Walker as "one of the twelve best reporters in New York."

=== The New Yorker ===
McKelway came to The New Yorker at the behest of Harold Ross who "was looking to infuse the magazine with a jolt of gritty reportage." He served as a managing editor for journalistic contributions at The New Yorker from 1936 to 1939. While editor he hired E. J. Kahn Jr., Joseph Mitchell, Brendan Gill, Philip Hamburger and Margaret Case Harriman. During World War II, he held public relations posts for the Army Air Force, leaving the service with the rank of lieutenant colonel. After the war McKelway returned to The New Yorker and remained at the magazine for 47 years. According to William Shawn, McKelway "was one of the handful of people who, together with Harold Ross, The New Yorker's founding editor, set the magazine on its course."

In 1950, he collected several of his pieces for The New Yorker in the book True Tales from the Annals of Crime & Rascality. One article from that collection was the basis for the 1950 movie Mister 880, starring Edmund Gwenn as a small-time counterfeiter of one dollar bills, who eluded the United States Secret Service for ten years, from 1938 to 1948. St. Clair McKelway also wrote screenplays for two other movies in 1948: Sleep, My Love, directed by Douglas Sirk, and The Mating of Millie, starring Glenn Ford and Evelyn Keyes. He published the book The Edinburgh Caper: A One-Man International Plot, based on a New Yorker article, in 1962.

In 2010, Bloomsbury USA published a paperback-original collection of 18 of McKelway's works, Reporting at Wit's End: Tales from the New Yorker (ISBN 978-1-60819-034-8), with an appreciative introduction by Adam Gopnik of The New Yorker.

== Personal life ==
McKelway was married five times, including to the writer Maeve Brennan. His brother Benjamin Mosby McKelway was a reporter for The Washington Star. He was also involved with Eileen McKenney.

St. Clair McKelway died at the DeWitt Nursing Home in Manhattan on January 10, 1980.

He should not be confused with his great-uncle, also named St. Clair McKelway, the editor of the Brooklyn Eagle.

== Bibliography ==
=== Books ===
- Gossip: The Life And Times Of Walter Winchell (1940)
- True Tales from the Annals of Crime and Rascality (1951)
- The Edinburgh Caper: A One-Man International Plot (1962)
- The Big Little Man from Brooklyn (1969)
- Reporting at Wit's End: Tales from The New Yorker (2010)

=== Articles ===
- McKelway, St. Clair (January 1, 1949). "Annals of Crime: The Wily Wilby - I". The New Yorker. Vol. 24, no. 45. pp. 23–33. Part 1 of a report on Ralph Marshall Wilby.
- McKelway, St. Clair (January 8, 1949). "Annals of Crime: The Wily Wilby - II". The New Yorker. Vol. 24, no. 46. pp. 34–47. Part 2 of a report on Ralph Marshall Wilby.

=== Essays ===
"An Affix for Birds," in A Subtreasury of American Humor, edited by E. B. White and Katharine S. White
