= Child labor laws in the United States =

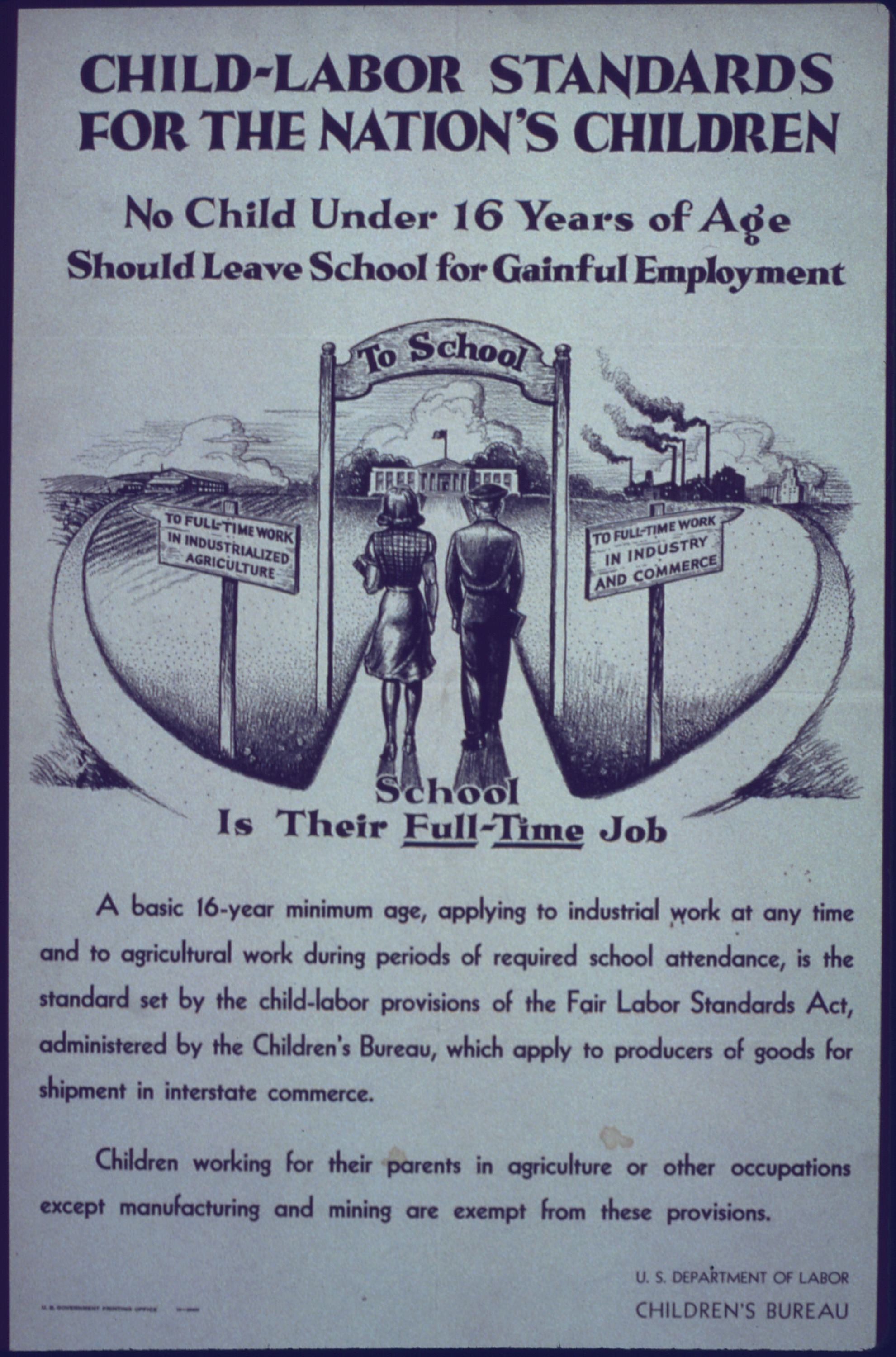
1940s child labor standards poster

Child labor laws in the United States address issues related to the employment and welfare of working children in the United States. The most sweeping federal law that restricts the employment and abuse of child workers is the Fair Labor Standards Act of 1938 (FLSA), which came into force during the Franklin D. Roosevelt administration. Child labor provisions under FLSA are designed to protect the educational opportunities of youth and prohibit their employment in jobs that are detrimental to their health and safety. FLSA restricts the hours that youth under 16 years of age can work and lists hazardous occupations too dangerous for young workers to perform.

== Federal law ==
The main law regulating child labor in the United States is the Fair Labor Standards Act. For non-agricultural jobs, children under 14 may not be employed, children between 14 and 16 may be employed in allowed occupations during limited hours, and children between 16 and 17 may be employed for unlimited hours in non-hazardous occupations. A number of exceptions to these rules exist, such as for employment by parents, newspaper delivery, and child actors. The regulations for agricultural employment are generally less strict.

== State laws ==
States have varying laws covering youth employment. Each state has minimum requirements such as, earliest age a child may begin working, number of hours a child is allowed to be working during the day, number of hours a child is allowed to be worked during the week. The United States Department of Labor lists the minimum requirements for agricultural work in each state. Where state law differs from federal law on child labor, the law with the more rigorous standard applies.

Individual states have a wide range of restrictions on labor by minors, often requiring work permits for minors who are still enrolled in high school, limiting the times and hours that minors can work by age and imposing additional safety regulations.

By 2023, states such as New Jersey and Arkansas had loosened child labor restrictions following the lessening of the COVID-19 pandemic severity, with violations increasing nationwide as a tight labor market increased worker demand. Modifications included lowering the age in which children could work certain jobs, expanding the number of and timing of hours they could be required to work, often to include school time, and shielding businesses from civil liability for work-related injuries, illnesses, or deaths sustained by such workers.

== Employment certificates ==
The federal legal system had limited powers to pass child labor laws primarily due to the constitution that gave parents the right to raise their children as they pleased. It was a matter for the states to deal with and created their own child labor laws including age and schooling requirements. For regular, full-time work, "age and schooling certificates", "work permits", or "employment certificates" were issued in States to children, usually 14 or 15, before they may go to work in certain occupations, generally manufacturing, and mercantile. No certifications were required for agriculture, street trades, and work in private households.

== Reformation of child labor laws ==
The start of the 20th century was the time when reform efforts became widespread. The National Child Labor Committee, an organization dedicated to the abolition of all child labor, was formed in 1904. By publishing information on the lives and working conditions of young workers, it helped to mobilize popular support for state-level child labor laws. These laws were often paired with compulsory education laws which were designed to curtail child labor to an extent, keep children in school, and out of the paid labor market until a specified age (usually 12, 14, or 16 years.) In 1906 Republican Senator Albert J. Beveridge introduced the first child labor bill at the national level that brought heightened attention to the topic. The bill was later turned down by President Theodore Roosevelt.

In 1916, under pressure from the National Child Labor Committee (NCLC) and the National Consumers League, the United States Congress passed the Keating–Owen Act, outlawing interstate commerce involving goods produced by employees under the ages of 14, 15 or 16, depending on the type of work. Southern Democrats were opposed but did not filibuster the bill. President Woodrow Wilson had ignored the issue but now endorsed the bill at the last minute under pressure from party leaders who stressed how popular the idea was, especially among the emerging class of women voters. He told Democratic Congressmen they needed to pass this law and also a workman's compensation law to satisfy the national progressive movement and to win the 1916 election against a reunited GOP. Child labor had officially become an issue of concern to the federal government and it was the first federal child labor law. However, the U.S. Supreme Court struck down the law in Hammer v. Dagenhart (1918) because it regulated commerce that did not cross state lines. Congress used its taxing power by passing a 10-percent tax on businesses that used child labor, but that was struck down by the Supreme Court in Bailey v. Drexel Furniture (1923). Child labor was significantly reduced by the 1930s.

In response to these setbacks, Congress, on June 2, 1924, approved a Constitutional amendment that would authorize Congress to regulate "labor of persons under eighteen years of age", and submitted it to the states for ratification. Only five states ratified the amendment in the 1920s. However, President Franklin D. Roosevelt’s administration supported it, and another 14 states signed on in 1933 (his first year in office); 28 states in all had given their approval by 1937. An additional 8 states were needed at the time to ratify the proposed amendment.

The common legal opinion on federal child labor regulation reversed in the 1930s. Congress passed the Fair Labor Standards Act in 1938 regulating the employment of those under 16 or 18 years of age, and the Supreme Court upheld the law. After this shift, the amendment has been described as "moot" and effectively part of the Constitution.

== Agricultural child labor ==
However, while the 1938 labor law placed limits on many forms of child labor, agricultural labor was excluded. As a result, approximately 500,000 children pick almost a quarter of the food currently produced in the United States.

According to a 2010 petition by Human Rights Watch:

Hundreds of thousands of children are employed as farm workers in the United States, often working 10 or more hours a day. They are often exposed to dangerous pesticides, experience high rates of injury, and suffer fatalities at five times the rate of other working youth. Their long hours contribute to alarming drop-out rates. Government statistics show that barely half ever finish high school. According to the National Safety Council, agriculture is the second most dangerous occupation in the United States. However, current US child labor laws allow child farm workers to work longer hours, at younger ages, and under more hazardous conditions than other working youths. While children in other sectors must be 12 to be employed and cannot work more than 3 hours on a school day, in agriculture, children can work at age 12 for unlimited hours before and after school.

== See also ==
- Marie Moentmann (1900–1974), child survivor of industrial accident
- Carmela Teoli (1897–c. 1970), child survivor of industrial accident
- Timeline of children's rights in the United States
- United States labor law
