= List of United States Supreme Court cases, volume 247 =

Supreme Court of the United States
- Interactive map of Supreme Court of the United States
- 38°53′26″N 77°00′16″W
- Established: March 4, 1789; 236 years ago
- Location: Washington, D.C.
- Coordinates: 38°53′26″N 77°00′16″W
- Composition method: Presidential nomination with Senate confirmation
- Authorised by: Constitution of the United States, Art. III, § 1
- Judge term length: life tenure, subject to impeachment and removal
- Number of positions: 9 (by statute)
- Website: supremecourt.gov

This is a list of cases reported in volume 247 of United States Reports, decided by the Supreme Court of the United States in 1918.

== Justices of the Supreme Court at the time of volume 247 U.S. ==
The Supreme Court is established by Article III, Section 1 of the Constitution of the United States, which says: "The judicial Power of the United States, shall be vested in one supreme Court . . .". The size of the Court is not specified; the Constitution leaves it to Congress to set the number of justices. Under the Judiciary Act of 1789 Congress originally fixed the number of justices at six (one chief justice and five associate justices). Since 1789 Congress has varied the size of the Court from six to seven, nine, ten, and back to nine justices (always including one chief justice).

When the cases in volume 247 were decided the Court comprised the following nine members:

Portrait	Justice	Office	Home State	Succeeded	Date confirmed by the Senate (Vote)	Tenure on Supreme Court
	Edward Douglass White	Chief Justice	Louisiana	Melville Fuller	December 12, 1910 (Acclamation)	December 19, 1910 – May 19, 1921 (Died)
	Joseph McKenna	Associate Justice	California	Stephen Johnson Field	January 21, 1898 (Acclamation)	January 26, 1898 – January 5, 1925 (Retired)
	Oliver Wendell Holmes Jr.	Associate Justice	Massachusetts	Horace Gray	December 4, 1902 (Acclamation)	December 8, 1902 – January 12, 1932 (Retired)
	William R. Day	Associate Justice	Ohio	George Shiras Jr.	February 23, 1903 (Acclamation)	March 2, 1903 – November 13, 1922 (Retired)
	Willis Van Devanter	Associate Justice	Wyoming	Edward Douglass White (as Associate Justice)	December 15, 1910 (Acclamation)	January 3, 1911 – June 2, 1937 (Retired)
	Mahlon Pitney	Associate Justice	New Jersey	John Marshall Harlan	March 13, 1912 (50–26)	March 18, 1912 – December 31, 1922 (Resigned)
	James Clark McReynolds	Associate Justice	Tennessee	Horace Harmon Lurton	August 29, 1914 (44–6)	October 12, 1914 – January 31, 1941 (Retired)
	Louis Brandeis	Associate Justice	Massachusetts	Joseph Rucker Lamar	June 1, 1916 (47–22)	June 5, 1916 – February 13, 1939 (Retired)
	John Hessin Clarke	Associate Justice	Ohio	Charles Evans Hughes	July 24, 1916 (Acclamation)	October 9, 1916 – September 18, 1922 (Retired)

== Notable Case in 247 U.S. ==
=== Hammer v. Dagenhart ===
In Hammer v. Dagenhart, 247 U.S. 251 (1918), the Supreme Court struck down a federal law regulating child labor. During the Progressive Era, public sentiment in the United States turned against what was perceived as increasingly intolerable child labor conditions. In response, Congress passed the Keating–Owen Act, prohibiting the sale in interstate commerce of any merchandise that had been made either by children under the age of fourteen, or by children under sixteen who worked more than sixty hours per week. By a 5–4 majority, the Supreme Court struck down the Keating–Owen Act, holding that the Commerce Clause did not give Congress the power to regulate working conditions. In a dissenting opinion, Justice Oliver Wendell Holmes Jr., joined by three other justices, argued that goods manufactured in one state and sold in other states were, by definition, interstate commerce, and so Congress should have power to regulate the manufacturing of those goods. In 1941 Hammer v. Dagenhart was overruled by the Court in United States v. Darby Lumber Co.

== Citation style ==
Under the Judiciary Act of 1789 the federal court structure at the time comprised District Courts, which had general trial jurisdiction; Circuit Courts, which had mixed trial and appellate (from the US District Courts) jurisdiction; and the United States Supreme Court, which had appellate jurisdiction over the federal District and Circuit courts—and for certain issues over state courts. The Supreme Court also had limited original jurisdiction (i.e., in which cases could be filed directly with the Supreme Court without first having been heard by a lower federal or state court). There were one or more federal District Courts and/or Circuit Courts in each state, territory, or other geographical region.

The Judiciary Act of 1891 created the United States Courts of Appeals and reassigned the jurisdiction of most routine appeals from the district and circuit courts to these appellate courts. The Act created nine new courts that were originally known as the "United States Circuit Courts of Appeals." The new courts had jurisdiction over most appeals of lower court decisions. The Supreme Court could review either legal issues that a court of appeals certified or decisions of court of appeals by writ of certiorari. On January 1, 1912, the effective date of the Judicial Code of 1911, the old Circuit Courts were abolished, with their remaining trial court jurisdiction transferred to the U.S. District Courts.

Bluebook citation style is used for case names, citations, and jurisdictions.

- "# Cir." = United States Court of Appeals
  - e.g., "3d Cir." = United States Court of Appeals for the Third Circuit
- "D." = United States District Court for the District of . . .
  - e.g.,"D. Mass." = United States District Court for the District of Massachusetts
- "E." = Eastern; "M." = Middle; "N." = Northern; "S." = Southern; "W." = Western
  - e.g.,"M.D. Ala." = United States District Court for the Middle District of Alabama
- "Ct. Cl." = United States Court of Claims
- The abbreviation of a state's name alone indicates the highest appellate court in that state's judiciary at the time.
  - e.g.,"Pa." = Supreme Court of Pennsylvania
  - e.g.,"Me." = Supreme Judicial Court of Maine

== List of cases in volume 247 U.S. ==
Case Name	Page and year	Opinion of the Court	Concurring opinion(s)	Dissenting opinion(s)	Lower Court	Disposition of case
Shepard v. Barkley	1 (1918)	White	none	none	8th Cir.	affirmed
Cox v. Wood	3 (1918)	White	none	none	D. Kan.	affirmed
Perlman v. United States	7 (1918)	McKenna	none	none	S.D.N.Y.	affirmed
Gasquet v. Fenner	16 (1918)	Holmes	none	none	E.D. La.	affirmed
Ex parte Southwestern Surety Insurance Company	19 (1918)	White	none	none	W.D.N.C.	prohibition denied
York Manufacturing Company v. Colley	21 (1918)	White	none	none	Tex. Civ. App.	reversed
Ex parte Abdu	27 (1918)	White	none	Brandeis	not indicated	mandamus denied
United States v. United Shoe Machinery Company of New Jersey	32 (1918)	McKenna	none	Day; Clarke	D. Mass.	affirmed
McGinis v. California I	91 (1918)	McKenna	none	none	Cal. Super. Ct.	reversed
McGinis v. California II	95 (1918)	McKenna	none	none	Cal. Super. Ct.	reversed
Erie Railroad Company v. Hilt	97 (1918)	Holmes	none	none	3d Cir.	reversed
Carney v. Chapman	102 (1918)	Holmes	none	none	Okla.	affirmed
Western Union Telegraph Company v. Foster	105 (1918)	Holmes	none	none	multiple	reversed
United States v. Biwabik Mining Company	116 (1918)	Day	none	none	6th Cir.	reversed
Goldfield Consolidated Mines Company v. Scott	126 (1918)	Day	none	none	9th Cir.	certification
Northwestern Mutual Life Insurance Company v. Wisconsin	132 (1918)	Day	none	none	Wis.	affirmed
Marin v. Augedahl	142 (1918)	VanDevanter	none	Clarke	N.D. Dist.	reversed
Peck and Company v. Lowe	165 (1918)	VanDevanter	none	none	S.D.N.Y.	affirmed
United States v. Ferguson	175 (1918)	VanDevanter	none	none	8th Cir.	affirmed
Doyle v. Mitchell Brothers Company	179 (1918)	Pitney	none	none	6th Cir.	affirmed
Hays v. Gauley Mountain Coal Company	189 (1918)	Pitney	none	none	4th Cir.	reversed
United States v. Cleveland, Cincinnati, Chicago and St. Louis Railway Company	195 (1918)	Pitney	none	none	6th Cir.	affirmed
Chicago and Alton Railroad Company v. United States	197 (1918)	McReynolds	none	none	7th Cir.	affirmed
Louisville and Nashville Railroad Company v. Rice	201 (1918)	McReynolds	none	none	E.D. La.	reversed
Union Pacific Railroad Company v. Laughlin	204 (1918)	Brandeis	none	none	Mo. Ct. App.	dismissed
Friederichsen v. Renard	207 (1918)	Clarke	none	none	8th Cir.	reversed
Looney v. Eastern Texas Railroad Company	214 (1918)	Clarke	none	none	W.D. Tex.	dismissed
Lynch v. Turrish	221 (1918)	McKenna	none	none	8th Cir.	affirmed
Ex parte Simons	231 (1918)	Holmes	none	none	S.D.N.Y.	mandamus granted
Alice State Bank v. Houston Pasture Company	240 (1918)	Holmes	none	none	5th Cir.	reversed
Minnesota v. Lane	243 (1918)	Day	none	none	original	dismissed
Hammer v. Dagenhart	251 (1918)	Day	none	Holmes	W.D.N.C.	affirmed
Union Pacific Railroad Company v. Weld County	282 (1918)	VanDevanter	none	none	8th Cir.	dismissed
Jefferson v. Fink	288 (1918)	VanDevanter	none	none	Okla.	affirmed
Hartranft v. Mullowny	295 (1918)	Pitney	none	none	D.C. Cir.	dismissed
San Pedro, Los Angeles and Salt Lake Railroad Company v. United States	307 (1918)	Pitney	none	none	9th Cir.	dismissed
United States v. St. Paul, Minneapolis and Manitoba Railway Company	310 (1918)	Pitney	none	none	9th Cir.	reversed
United States Glue Company v. Town of Oak Creek	321 (1918)	Pitney	none	none	Wis. Cir.	affirmed
Southern Pacific Company v. Lowe	330 (1918)	Pitney	none	none	S.D.N.Y.	reversed
Lynch v. Hornby	339 (1918)	Pitney	none	none	8th Cir.	reversed
Peabody v. Eisner	347 (1918)	Pitney	none	none	S.D.N.Y.	affirmed
Sunday Lake Iron Company v. Wakefield Township	350 (1918)	McReynolds	none	none	Mich.	affirmed
McCoy v. Union Elevated Railroad Company	354 (1918)	McReynolds	none	none	Ill.	affirmed
New Orleans and Northeastern Railroad Company v. Harris	367 (1918)	McReynolds	none	none	Miss.	reversed
Chelentis v. Luckenbach Steamship Company, Inc.	372 (1918)	McReynolds	none	none	2d Cir.	affirmed
Philippine Sugar Estates Development Company, Ltd. v. Government of the Philippine Islands	385 (1918)	Brandeis	none	none	Phil.	reversed
Supreme Council of The Royal Arcanum v. Behrend	394 (1918)	Brandeis	none	none	D.C. Cir.	reversed
Toledo Newspaper Company v. United States	402 (1918)	White	none	Holmes	6th Cir.	affirmed
Grinnell Washing Machine Company v. E.E. Johnson Company	426 (1918)	Day	none	none	7th Cir.	affirmed
Exploration Company, Ltd. v. United States	435 (1918)	Day	none	none	8th Cir.	affirmed
Jim Butler Tonopah Mining Company v. West End Consolidated Mining Company	450 (1918)	VanDevanter	none	none	Nev.	affirmed
Arkansas v. Tennessee	461 (1918)	Pitney	none	none	original	continued
Postal Telegraph Cable Company v. City of Newport	464 (1918)	Pitney	none	none	Ky.	reversed
Northern Pacific Railroad Company v. Solum	477 (1918)	Brandeis	none	none	Minn.	multiple
Aikins v. Kingsbury	484 (1918)	Clarke	none	none	Cal.	affirmed
Chicago, Milwaukee and St. Paul Railway Company v. Minneapolis Civic and Commerce Association	490 (1918)	Clarke	none	none	Minn.	affirmed
