= Owen Lovejoy (disambiguation) =

Owen Lovejoy (1811–1864) was an American lawyer.

Owen Lovejoy may also refer to:

- Owen Lovejoy (anthropologist) (born 1943), American anthropologist
- Owen Reed Lovejoy (1866–1961), American opponent of child labor
