= National Child Labor Committee =

Defunct American nonprofit organization

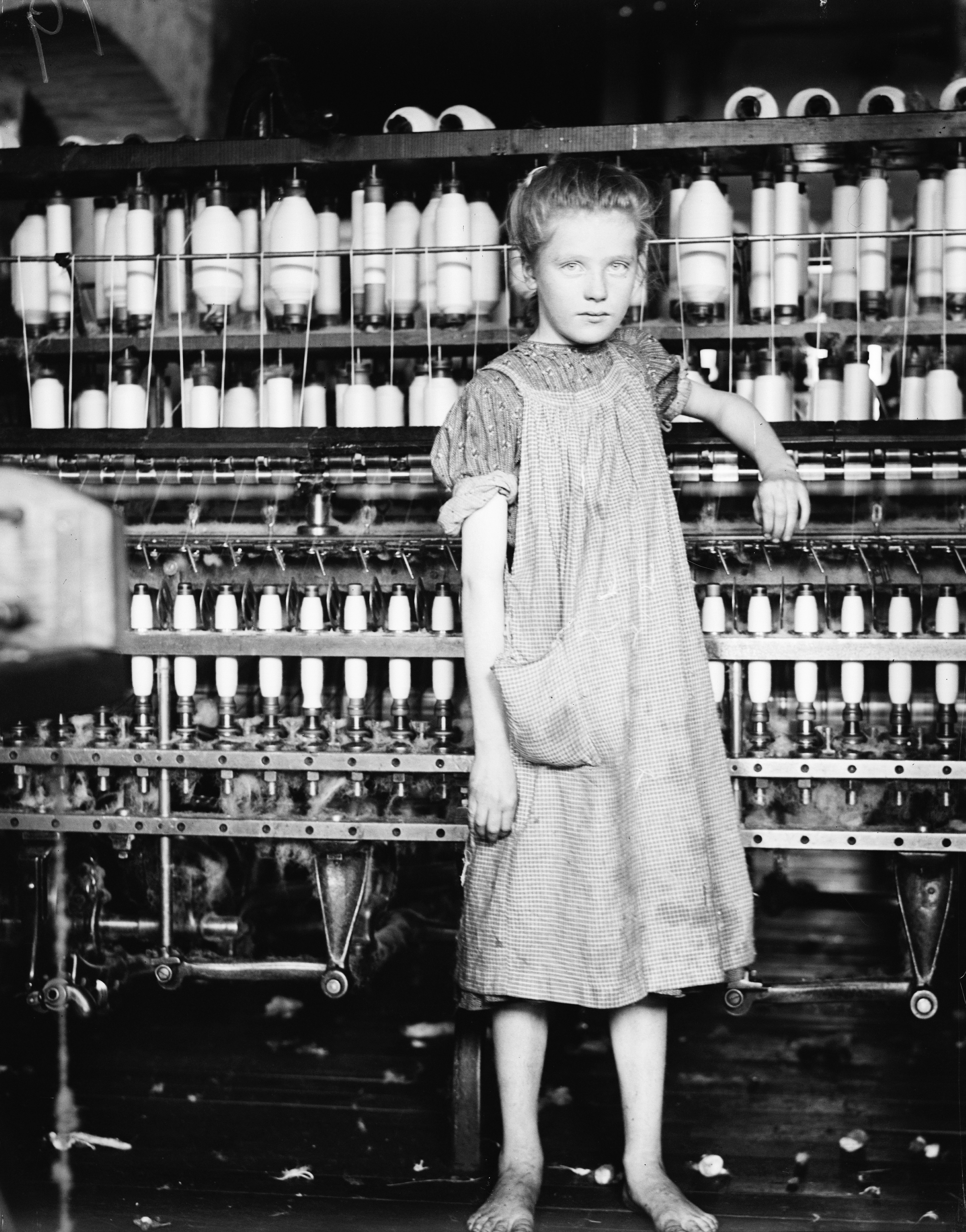
"Addie Card, 12 years. Spinner in Cotton Mill. Vt." by Lewis Hine.

The National Child Labor Committee (NCLC) was a private, non-profit organization in the United States that served as a leading proponent for the national child labor reform movement. Its mission was to promote "the rights, awareness, dignity, well-being and education of children and youth as they relate to work and working."

NCLC, headquartered on Broadway in Manhattan, New York, was administered by a board of directors, with the last chair head being Betsy Brand.

== Formation ==
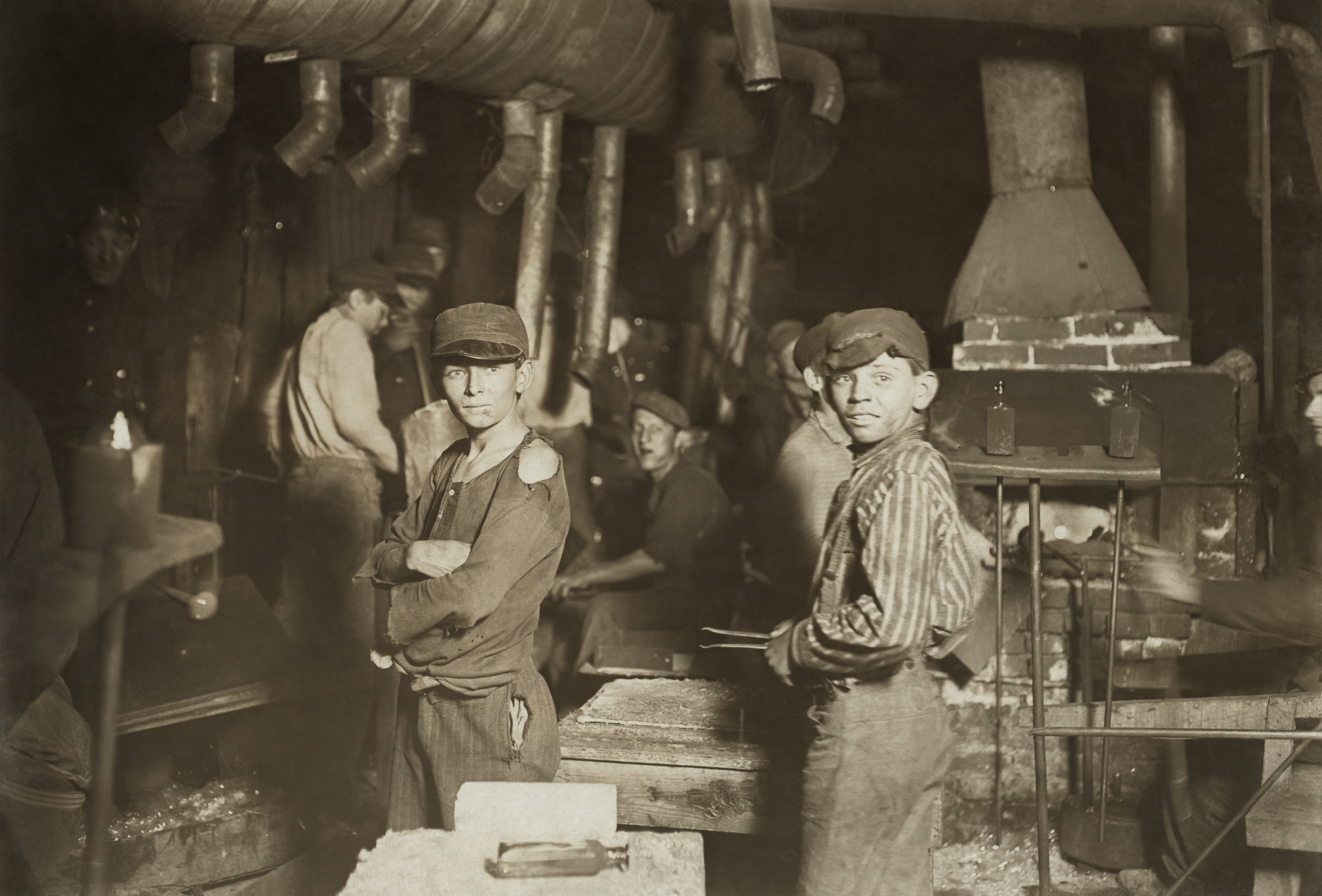
Child labor in Indiana glassworks. (Hine, 1908)

Edgar Gardner Murphy, an American clergyman and author, is credited with proposing the National Child Labor Committee following a conference between Murphy's Alabama Child Labor Committee, and the New York Child Labor Committee. The conference culminated on April 25, 1904 at a mass meeting held in Carnegie Hall, New York City. At the meeting, both men and women concerned with the plight of working children overwhelmingly supported the formation of the National Child Labor Committee, and Felix Adler was elected its first Chairman.

The new organization moved swiftly in procuring the support of prominent Americans. In November 1904, barely half a year after its conception, the NCLC boasted the membership of leading politicians, philanthropists, clergymen, and intellectuals including: former president Grover Cleveland, Senator Benjamin Tillman of South Carolina, and the president of Harvard University, Charles W. Eliot.

In 1907, the NCLC was chartered by an act of Congress with a board of directors originally including prominent Progressive reformers such as Jane Addams, Florence Kelley, Edward Thomas Devine, Deborah Donalds, and Lillian Wald. With the leadership of such prominent reformers, the organization quickly began to attract additional support and moved towards action and advocacy.

== Exposing child labor ==
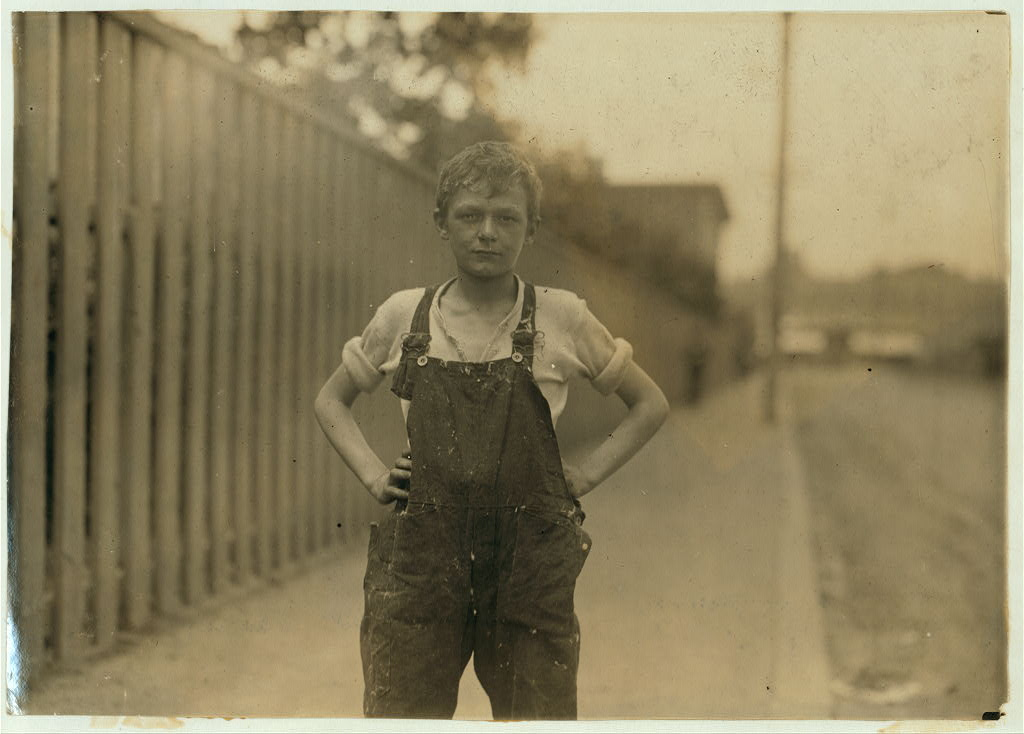
Young worker in a Merchants Mill

According to the 1900 US Census, a total of 1,752,187 (about 1 in every 6) children under the age of sixteen were engaged in "gainful occupations" in the United States. This number represents a fifty percent increase from the 1,118,356 children working for wages in 1880. This trend alarmed Americans who, while supporting the traditional role of children in agriculture, found the idea of American youth laboring for meager wages in industrial factories appalling. From 1909 to 1921 the NCLC capitalized on this moral outrage by making it the focal point of the NCLC campaign against child labor.

== Lewis Hine and the National Child Labor Committee ==
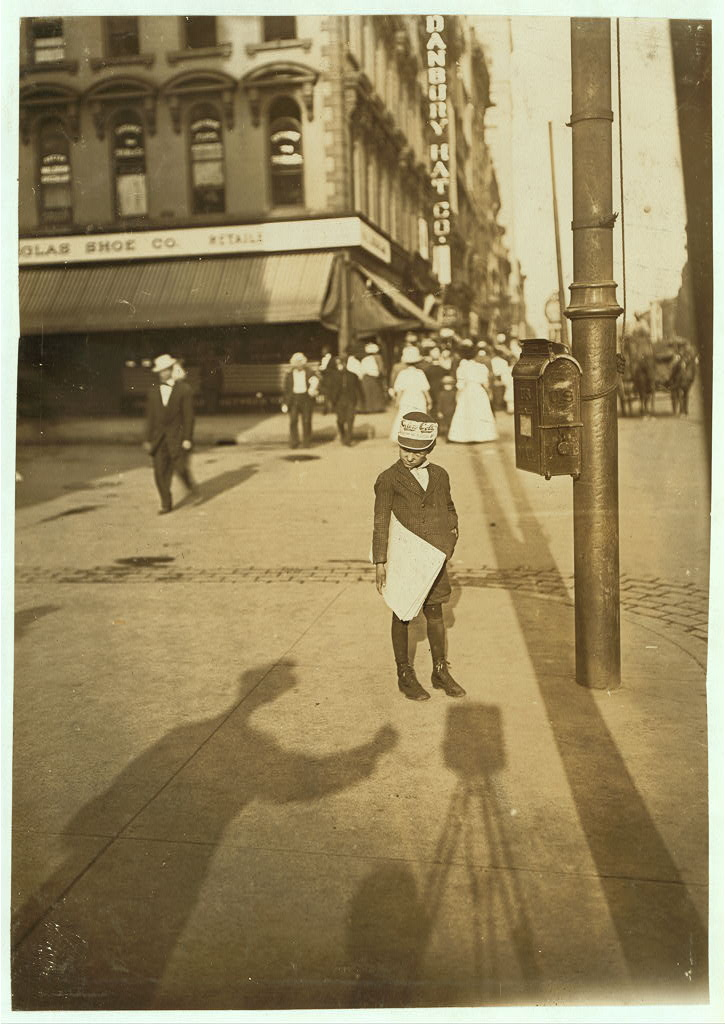
Lewis Hine's shadow appears in his portrait of newsboy John Howell, working the street corner in Indianapolis in 1908.

In 1908 the National Child Labor Committee hired Lewis Hine, a teacher and professional photographer trained in sociology, who advocated photography as an educational medium, to document child labor in American industry. Over the next ten years Hine would publish thousands of photographs designed to pull at the nation's heartstrings.

Hine's subjects included both boys and girls employed by mills and factories and other occupations all over the United States. For the average American, Hine provided an otherwise unavailable window into the somber working conditions facing America's youth. When asked about his work on the subject Hine simply stated that he "wanted to show things that had to be corrected." Hine's work resulted in a wave of popular support for federal child labor regulations put forward by the NCLC. In effect, Hine's photographs became the face of the National Child Labor Committee, and are among the earliest examples of documentary photography in America.

Lewis Hine was an influential photo journalist in the years leading up to the First World War. It was during those years that the American economy was doing well, and the need for labor was at an all-time high. Cheap labor was necessary, and American businesses were not only looking for immigrant workers but also child labor as well. The factory-oriented jobs were very specific, and a child was a perfect candidate for the work that was necessary. Their small hands and energy were beneficial to the assembly line.

There was a shift in thinking in the early 1900s towards an end to child labor. The argument from reformers, as they were called, was that child labor was a sick cycle that was inevitably going to end in a future of poverty for the children in the work force. The long hours were robbing children of not only an education but a childhood as well.

Lewis Hine became an investigative photojournalist for the National Child Labor Committee in the early 1900s. Hine took many pictures of workers under the age of 16 in the field. His pictures are the ones that appear in many books on the history of child labor. His photographs were taken in high risk situations in order to capture the negative side of child labor. His photographs also helped make the National Child Labor Committee investigate the child labor that was taking place in many of America's factories. "Hine was clever enough to bluff his way into many plants. He searched where he was not welcome, snapped scenes that were meant to be hidden from the public. At times, he was in real danger, risking physical attack when factory managers realized what he was up to…he put his life in the line in order to record a truthful picture of working children in early twentieth-century America". Today, there is a Lewis Hine award that awards 10 honorees in their outstanding work in servicing young people. Each winner wins 1,000 dollars and a trip to New York to attend the awards ceremony.

== Fighting against child labor ==
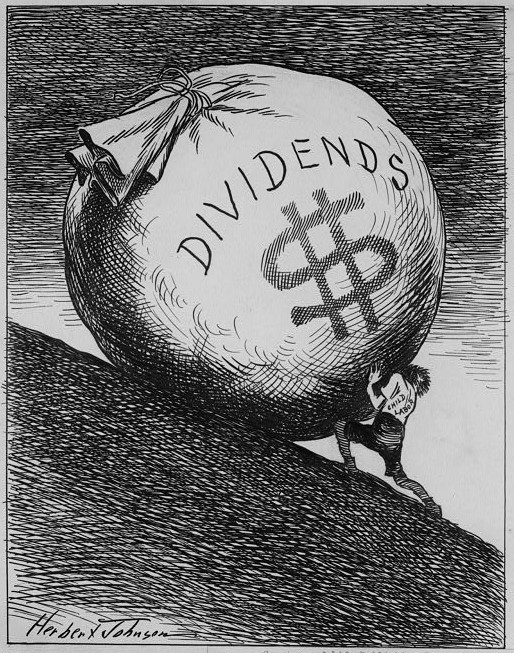
A Poster from the committee inspired by the myth of Sisyphus to denounce child labor in capitalism, c. 1913

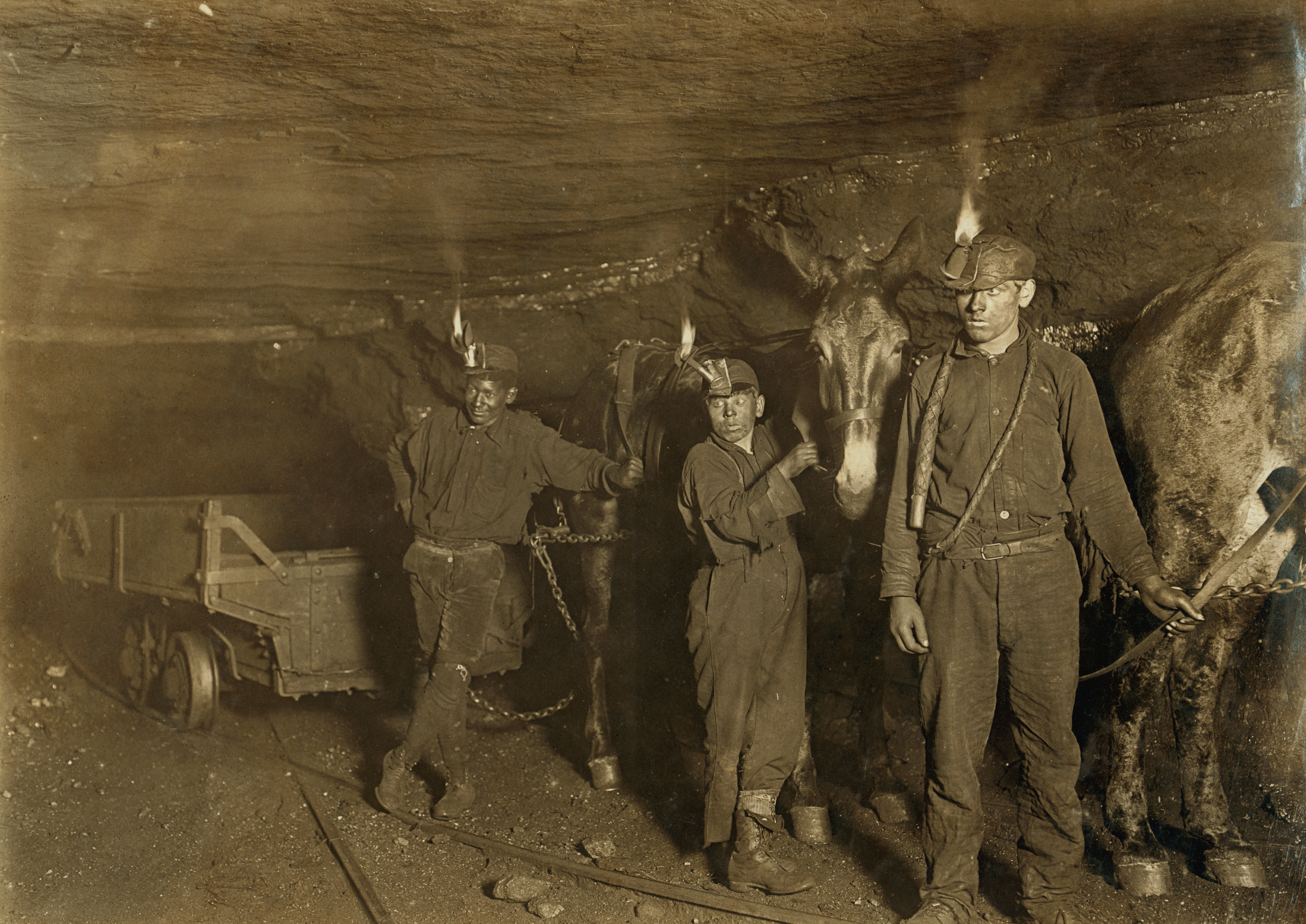
Photo of child coal miners in West Virginia by Lewis Hine (1908)

Immediately after its conception in 1904, the National Child Labor Committee (NCLC) began advocating for child labor reform on the state level. A number of state- centered campaigns were organized by the NCLC's two regional leaders, Owen Lovejoy in the northern states and Alexander McKelway in the southern states. Both Lovejoy and McKelway actively organized investigations of child labor conditions and lobbied state legislatures for labor regulations.

Although the NCLC made some strides in the north, by 1907, McKelway and the NCLC had achieved little success in enlisting the support of the southern people and had failed to pass any far-reaching reforms in the south's important mill states. Consequently, the NCLC decided to refocus its state-by-state attack on child labor and endorsed the first national anti-child labor bill, introduced to congress by Senator Albert J. Beveridge of Indiana in 1907. Although the bill was later defeated, it convinced many opponents of child labor that a solution lay in the cooperation and solidarity between the states.

In response, the NCLC called for the establishment of a federal children's bureau that would investigate and report on the circumstances of all American children. In 1912 the NCLC succeeded in passing an act establishing a United States Children's Bureau in the Department of Commerce and Labor. On April 9 President William Taft signed the act into law, and over the next thirty years the Children's Bureau would work closely with the NCLC to promote child labor reforms on both the state and national level.

In 1915, the NCLC, facing the varied success and inherent limitations of its efforts at the state level, decided to move its efforts to the federal level. On its behalf, Pennsylvania Congressman A Mitchell Palmer (later Attorney General) introduced a bill to end child labor in most American mines and factories. President Wilson found it constitutionally unsound and after the House voted 232 to 44 in favor on February 15, 1915, he allowed it to die in the Senate. Nevertheless, Arthur Link has called it "a turning point in American constitutional history" because it attempted to establish for the first time "the use of the Commerce Clause commerce power to justify almost any form of federal control over working conditions and wages."

In 1916, Senator Robert L. Owen of Oklahoma and Representative Edward Keating of Colorado introduced the NCLC backed Keating-Owen Act which prohibited shipment in interstate commerce of goods manufactured or processed by child labor. The bill passed by a margin of 337 to 46 in the House and 50 to 12 in the Senate and was signed into law by President Woodrow Wilson as the centerpiece of The New Freedom Program. However, in 1918 the law was deemed unconstitutional by the United States Supreme Court in a five-to-four decision in Hammer v. Dagenhart. The court, although acknowledging child labor as a social evil, felt that the Keating-Owen Act overstepped congress' power to regulate trade. The bill was immediately revised and again deemed unconstitutional by the Supreme Court.

The NCLC then switched its strategy to passing of a federal constitutional amendment. In 1924 Congress passed the Child Labor Amendment with a vote of 297 to 69 (with 64 abstaining) in the house and 61 to 23 (12 abstaining) in the senate. However, by 1932 only six states had voted for ratification, while twenty-four had rejected the measure. Today, the amendment is technically still-pending and has been ratified by a total of twenty-eight states, requiring the ratification of ten more for its incorporation into the Constitution.

In 1938 the National Child Labor Committee threw its support behind the Fair Labor Standards Act (FLSA) which included child labor provisions designed by the NCLC. The act prohibits any interstate commerce of goods produced through oppressive child labor. The act defines "oppressive child labor" as any form of employment for children under age sixteen and any particularly hazardous occupation for children ages sixteen to eighteen. This definition excludes agricultural labor and instances in which the child is employed by his or her guardians. On June 25, 1938, after the approval of Congress, President Franklin D. Roosevelt signed the bill into law; the FLSA remains the primary federal child labor law to this day.

For the entirety of World War II, the NCLC served as a watchdog to ensure that employment shortages caused by the war did not weaken the newly passed and implemented child labor laws, and that children were not drawn back into the mines, mills and streets.

== Promoting vocational skills and workplace education ==
After WWII, the National Child Labor Committee significantly broadened its scope of involvement by placing a new emphasis on the importance of educating children about the working world as well as advocating programs designed to advance the education and health of migrant farmworkers throughout America. Today the NCLC's four main goals include:

- Educating children about the world of work
- Preventing the exploitation of children and youth in the labor market
- Improving the health and education opportunities for the children of the migrant farmworkers
- Increasing public awareness of the work done day-in and day-out on behalf of the nation's children

During the 1950s and 60s the NCLC advocated and contributed to the various bills including the Manpower Development and Training Act, the Economic Opportunity Act and the Vocational Education Act.

In 1979 NCLC collaborated with the Opportunities Industrialization Centers of America to found the National Youth Employment Coalition (NYEC). The NYEC was formed in order to provide support to organizations that help youth become productive private citizens. The NCLC provided the original housing for the NYEC and shared an Executive Director from 1983-1987.

In 1985 the NCLC introduced the Lewis Hine Awards for Service to Children and Youth, which honor Americans for their work with young people, and give special awards to better-known leaders for their extraordinary efforts. Over the past two decades the awards have developed into an annual event of national notoriety with awards given out to a diverse range of professionals and volunteers. Some past recipients include Gene Bowen of Warwick, New York, in 2008 who co-founded Road Recovery, a skills program designed for teens recovering from drug addiction and Stacy Maciuk of Brentwood, Tennessee in 2007 for her advocacy of children in foster care and organizing a suitcase collection drive to provide foster children with a place to pack their clothes and possessions.

From 1991 to today, the National Child Labor Committee created and expanded the Kids and the Power of Work (KAPOW) program. KAPOW exists as a network of private business and elementary school partnerships which introduces students to the world of work through lessons taught by private sector volunteers. Today, KAPOW serves as a model for similar programs, runs operations in over thirty communities from Florida to California, and serves over 50,000 students.

== Demise ==
During its final years fundraising failed to produce the income it needed, and it finally ran out of money. The social ill it had been funded to combat, had ended. The NCLC is a rare example of an organization which succeeded in its mission and was no longer needed. After more than a century of fighting child labor—in fields, in sweatshops, and in well-known corporations—it shut down in 2017. There was no announcement of its end. Jeffrey Newman, the last president of the New York-based committee, said the NCLC board decided to "declare victory and just move out."

== Notable people ==
- Jane Addams
- Felix Adler
- Grover Cleveland
- Ann Washington Craton
- Edward Thomas Devine
- Deborah Donalds
- Charles William Eliot
- Florence Kelley
- Owen Reed Lovejoy
- Edgar Gardner Murphy
- Benjamin Tillman
- Loraine Bedsole Bush Tunstall
- Lillian Wald

== See also ==
- Seebert Lane Colored School
- Timeline of children's rights in the United States
