= Alexander McKelway =

American minister and journalist

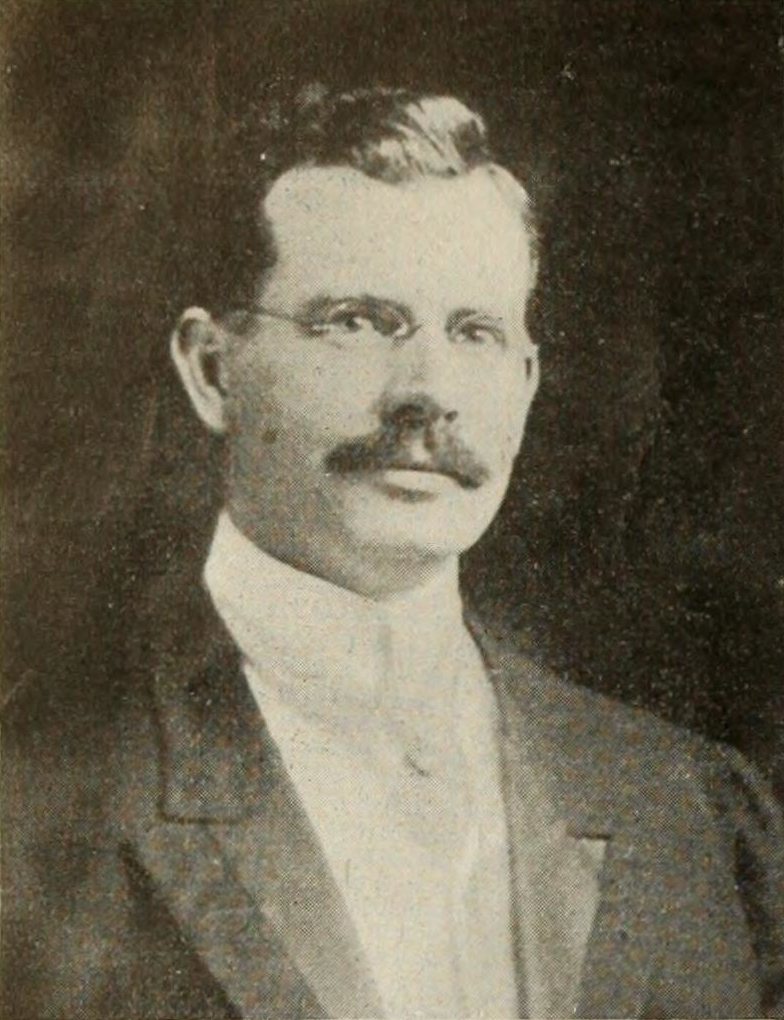
Alexander J. McKelway

Alexander Jeffrey McKelway (October 6, 1866 – April 16, 1918) was an American Presbyterian minister, and journalist. A supporter of the Presidency of Woodrow Wilson he is best known as a Progressive Era reformer, especially as an activist for child labor restrictions at the state and national level. He served as editor of the Presbyterian Standard magazine and as southern secretary of the National Child Labor Committee, he influenced the Democratic platform of 1916 and the Child Labor Bill of 1916. In 1916 he campaigned for Woodrow Wilson, serving as the director of the Bureau of Education and Social Service of the Democratic National Committee. He wrote two influential pamphlets promoting Wilson as a Progressive Era reformer: "The Schoolmaster in the White House" and "Woodrow Wilson and Social Justice."

== Childhood and family ==
McKelway was born in Salisbury, Pennsylvania to John Ryan McKelway and Catherine Scott Comfort McKelway. He grew up in Albemarle County, Virginia and Charlotte County, Virginia, attended Union Theological Seminary in Richmond, and graduated from Hampden–Sydney College in 1886. He married Lavinia Rutherford Smith and had five children including Alexander McKelway, the writer St. Clair McKelway and the journalist Benjamin Mosby McKelway.

== Career ==
After a short time as a Presbyterian minister, McKelway became a writer and editor with The Presbyterian Standard and then The Charlotte News. He soon became involved in child labor reform. He became Southern regional organizer for the National Child Labor Committee. In 1909 McKelway moved the family to Washington to continue his work with the committee. His efforts resulted in the creation of the United States Children's Bureau. Many credit McKelway with the passage of the Keating-Owen Act of 1916.

McKelway and his family lived in the Georgetown neighborhood. He died on April 16, 1918, the same day the Supreme Court heard oral argument in Hammer v. Dagenhart, in which the Court subsequently overturned the child labor law to which McKelway had devoted his career.
