= Ann Washington Craton =

American activist (1891–1970)

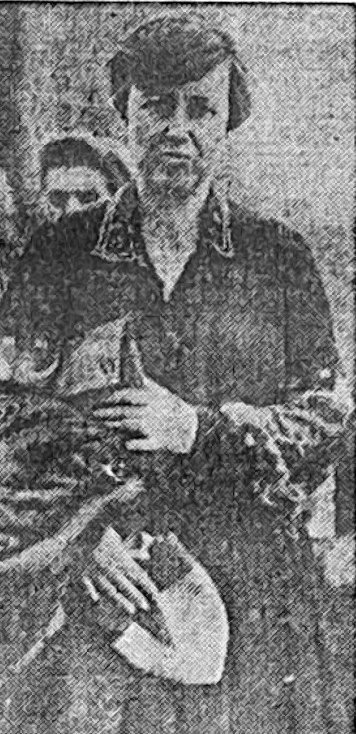
- Ann Washington Craton
- Born: September 1, 1901; North Carolina, US
- Died: 1970; Rockville, Maryland, US
- Education: Columbian College of Arts and Sciences, George Washington University
- Known for: Labor and feminist activism
- Spouse: Heber Blankenhorn

Ann Washington Craton (1891–1970) was a labor activist, social services, worker, and feminist who helped to organize and support low-paid women workers who worked in rural and suburban garment factories during the 1920s. Middle-class and American-born, she helped to expand unionization work beyond the then-dominant Yiddish-speaking urban shops of the time and helped as well to overcome male-dominated resistance to female labor organization. Using trial and error as her method, she became adept at working with women of varying ages and ethnic backgrounds. She refused to adopt party-line labor political positions. She successfully overcame accusations of being merely a "sentimental middle-class liberal" or "bourgeois intellectual" and showed that enthusiastic and idealistic college-trained women organizers could perform at least as well as the working-class men who dominated the labor movement. Craton wrote vividly of her experiences in contemporary news sources. As organizer and activist, she helped to reduce and alleviate the hardships of child labor, provide relief for families in distress, and place unwanted children in good homes.

Born in North Carolina, she received a Bachelor of Arts degree from George Washington University in 1915 and attended the Columbia University Graduate School of Social Sciences in the early 1920s. During the depression years of the 1930s, she worked in public service agencies including the Institute of Social and Religious Research, the WPA Public Works of Art project, and the New York Temporary Emergency Relief Committee. After her marriage to Heber Blankenhorn in 1936, she devoted her time to study and research but produced nothing for publication.

== Early life and education ==
Craton grew up with her mother and five siblings in a family from which her father, an insurance salesman, was absent much of the time. (Note: The 1870 US Census lists Richard W. Craton, then age five, living with his mother and no other relatives in Piney Grove, NC. The 1910 Census shows him living with his wife and children in Parkersburg, West Virginia. The 1930 and 1940 Censuses show him boarding by himself in Beattyville, Kentucky. When one of his daughters died in 1941, her obituary made no mention of her father and when his wife died in 1942, her obituary made no mention of him either as survivor or prior deceased.) In about 1911, Craton moved with her mother and siblings to Washington, D.C. That city was the home of her maternal grandmother who had been widowed in 1907. She began study at Columbia College in George Washington University and in 1915 graduated with a Bachelor of Arts degree. She also attended the Columbia University Graduate School of Social Sciences between 1922 and 1924.

== Career as progressive activist ==
After graduating from college, Craton worked for a social services organization and an agency of the federal Labor Department in Washington and then moved to New York City where she transitioned to union organization and relief work.

=== Social services worker ===
Craton's first job out of college was as a case investigator and adoption supervisor for the Washington, D.C., Board of Children's Guardians. Founded by Congress in 1892, this agency was charged with reviewing requests from indigent parents or guardians and interfacing with parents seeking to adopt. A news piece in the Washington Post in 1915 described Craton as "mother at large" to 150 children of "varying ages, colors, races, and parentage". In performing this job, she became a frequent spokesperson at local clubs and other social gatherings in the District and at this time was elected as a member of the local Federation of Women's Clubs. Early in 1919, she joined the Bureau of Labor (now the Bureau of Labor Statistics) as a field investigator responsible for compiling statistics on workers' cost of living.

=== Union organizer and relief worker ===
Later that year, she moved to New York City and became the secretary and an employment counselor for the National Child Labor Committee. While that group failed in its attempt to achieve government regulation, it succeeded in investigating and publicizing the extreme hardship caused by unregulated child labor. Her prior work experience and new contact with socialists, labor leaders, and other radicals led Craton to seek a career in the then relatively youthful labor movement. Convinced that she was capable of organizing women working in the garment industries, she applied to Sidney Hillman, head of the Amalgamated Clothing Workers of America, for a job as organizer. The Amalgamated opposed the American Federation of Labor's relatively narrow focus on skilled trades and in particular its cautious approach to unionizing women in the garment industry. Craton thought that because it was dominated by foreign-born, mainly Yiddish-speaking men, the union needed women like her as organizers. She believed that as a native-born American, she could help organize the many native-born American girls and women who were working in the "runaway shops" that the big urban firms used to avoid paying union wages. At first, Hillman dismissed her as a "sentimental middle-class liberal", but recognizing that English-speaking workers had become outraged by the poor English spoken by Amalgamated staff members, he put her on the payroll and told her to report immediately to the shirtmakers' union in Philadelphia for training.

After a short period of training in Philadelphia, Craton began organizing in the runaway shops of the anthracite mining region of northeast Pennsylvania. Not long after her arrival, while talking to a factory girl about the union, she placed her hand on the girl's shoulder and was promptly arrested for assault and battery. In bailing her out, union officials explained that organizers were not permitted to touch nonunion workers. Thereafter, working in the tiny rural hamlets of the Schuylkill valley, she met many coal miners' daughters, widows, and wives who were, as she said, "exploited and overworked and underpaid". The inhabitants of this region were hyphenated Americans from Poland, Lithuania, Germany, Ireland, and other European countries. Despite the opposition of elected officials, sheriffs, clergymen, and factory owners, Craton found that the girls and women she encountered were generally eager to join up. Because their fathers and husbands were mostly committed members of the miners' union, they did not need to be convinced of the benefits of disciplined collective action. Craton wrote, "What pleased me as days went on were the steadily increasing badly spelled notes in childish handwriting from young shirtmakers in all the surrounding towns begging me to organize them. If an employer responded to the union movement by locking out workers, the union's city workers would strike in support of the rural union. Craton wrote, "The Pennsylvania State Constabulary, with its training station in the coal fields, was used to terrorize the strikers, so were the coal and iron police, and the local officials. Organizers were arrested and persecuted. It was difficult to find lawyers who would represent the union. The manufacturers brought all of their influence into play to break the struggling, plucky little local which was steadily getting a foothold." It took a year of effort, but in the end, one of the new locals obtained its objectives, including a 44-hour work week, doubled hourly pay, and weekly pay envelopes. Craton's success as an organizer was real, but the local's achievements were short-lived as a business slump subsequently caused the employers to shut down many rural workshops, including this one.

In 1920 and 1921, Craton encountered prejudice among native-born American workers against unionized foreign-born ones. Dispatched to a Boston suburb, she was asked to gain the cooperation of impoverished but in their minds respectable American-born women who had continued to work when Italian-American union members went out on strike. Taking care to honor their dignity and self-reliance, she won over these Yankee women one by one until, in the end, the last of the scabs capitulated. Once again, Craton's success was accompanied by a union defeat when a court injunction stopped the strike. The strikers were not greatly discouraged however since the union found work for them in Boston.

In May 1921, Craton helped to direct a strike at a runaway shop in Binghamton, New York, where, once again, the shop's owners used violence against strikers and organizers. The following year, she wrote an article for Amalgamated's journal, Advance, in which she ridiculed a large open shop clothing manufacturer who tried to convince his workers and the public of his benign intentions. While studying at Columbia University, she carried out research on the clothing and textile industry under the joint auspices of Columbia's economics department and the research department of the Amalgamated Clothing Workers of America.

During the second half of the 1920s, Craton traded work as a union organizer for work in a variety of paid and volunteer positions. She joined organizations that gave encouragement to girls and young women, relief to disaster victims, and support for garment industry strikers. In 1924, she joined the National League of Girls Clubs, an organization that gave working girls and young women opportunities for recreation and training in organizational management. The following year, she was appointed secretary of the Civic Club of New York, a radical organization of artists, teachers, and social workers. In 1926, she was affiliated with the American Civil Liberties Union. In 1927, she served as secretary for an ad hoc group called the Committee of One Hundred for the Defense of Needle Trade Workers and in that position defended the American Civil Liberties Union against an accusation of Communist sympathies.

In 1928, she directed efforts to provide relief for the 30,000 workers and their families in the New Bedford textile strike. During the New Bedford strike, Craton directed relief efforts for the industrial assistance program of a communist group called Workers International Relief. When she insisted that all the funds collected for relief should be distributed to the striking workers and none of it diverted to the communist group, she was taken off the project and returned to New York. In reporting on the strike, a reporter for the New Bedford Evening Standard said Craton did not limit herself to distributing relief but also addressed mass meetings of the strikers. She would draw attention to the many women present and stress the importance of women in all aspects of the strike. The reporter said, "She stands at the front of the platform, gestures little, speaks slowly and clearly, in simple language, repeats the expression, Fellow Workers constantly. Her face and manner draw the crowd. She gets applause."

In 1930, Craton became a field investigator for an ecumenical Christian charity devoted to studying social problems called the Institute of Social and Religious Research. Her job was to assemble data for a detailed study of the role of churches in rural industrial villages. The organization defined an industrial village as a hamlet dominated by a single industry and estimated that there were 4,000 of them in the U.S. at the time, many of them dominated by mills and many of the mill towns devoted to making textiles. (Note: Founded in 1921, the Institute of Social and Religious Research collected data via field research to study, in its words, "socio-religious phenomena".)

During 1930 and 1931, she was a relief worker in the national office of the American Red Cross in Washington, D.C. (Note: Some sources say she started work for the Red Cross in 1926. The first news account of her Red Cross work was published in 1930.) During the Great Southern Drought of 1930–1931, when President Herbert Hoover decided against providing relief via federal agencies and instead called upon the Red Cross to relieve victims, the Red Cross headquarters in Washington, D.C. sent Craton to coordinate the efforts of local Red Cross agencies in their efforts to help destitute families in the Appalachian Mountain region of Kentucky and West Virginia. In reporting on her work, she wrote: "In normal times there is great poverty and a miserable, low standard of living. Now because of drought and having their normal food supply burned, their problem is rapidly approaching the starvation level." She found that some local Red Cross groups had no sympathy for the suffering poor among them. According to her, a chairman of one of these agencies told an applicant for aid, "you can freeze and starve for all we are going to do for you." She told her superiors, "I am giving you the most flagrant examples so that at Washington you may realize what local chapter relief means and what responsibilities we have been forced to put into the hands of well-meaning but hopelessly ignorant and bigoted people".

=== Coordinator in New Deal relief agencies ===
Early in 1932, Craton left her job as caseworker for the Red Cross to become an investigator for a New York State relief agency called the Temporary Emergency Relief Administration. Created in 1931, shortly after Franklin Delano Roosevelt was reelected governor, the agency, usually called TERA, created jobs on a wide variety of public projects for unemployed men and women. For its director, Roosevelt Harry Hopkins, a man who would later become one of his closest advisors. Craton was hired on as a TERA investigator in New York City. Investigators visited the families of applicants in their homes and interviewed them in TERA offices. They had to certify that applicants were both indigent and capable of employment. Once accepted, recipients were given work providing income sufficient "to prevent physical suffering and to maintain living standards" and there was to be no discrimination on the basis of race, color, citizenship status, or political affiliation.

After Roosevelt became president in 1933, he appointed Hopkins as his relief administrator and in December of that year, Hopkins, as head of the Federal Emergency Relief Administration, founded a subsidiary program to support out-of-work artists called the Public Works of Art Project. Soon thereafter, Craton joined the head office as a project coordinator with responsibility for public relations. The Public Works of Art Project lasted only a few months. In that time Craton edited its monthly bulletin and acted as a field coordinator covering state projects in the South and West. When the project was disbanded in May 1934, Craton joined the team that was formed to dismantle the organization, help to place artists on state relief rolls, and disperse the many works of art that it then owned. Carrying out these tasks, she traveled throughout the states of the South and West. On one of these visits, to Coral Gables, Florida, home of the Florida regions project center, she was accompanied by first lady Eleanor Roosevelt.

When in August 1935 the Roosevelt administration created the Federal Art Project, Harry Hopkins, then head of FERA, its parent agency, chose arts administrator Holger Cahill to direct it. Cahill was a curator who had recently served as acting director of the Museum of Modern Art in New York. In 1934, while she was still working for FERA, Craton had told one of Hopkins's assistants that Cahill would be a good choice for the job. She had received this recommendation, in turn, from her brother-in-law, the well-known eclectic artist Peter Blume who was then working on his anti-fascist painting called "The Eternal City". (Note: Blume had married Craton's sister Grace in 1931. Grace "Ebie" Douglas Craton Blume was born in 1904 and died in 1999).) (Note: One source says Craton worked for the Agricultural Adjustment Administration during the 1930s but there is no support for this assertion.)

=== Feminist ===
In 1913, on the day before Woodrow Wilson was inaugurated as president, Craton participated in a Washington D.C. suffrage procession that had been organized by the feminist and women's rights advocate Alice Paul. When the city's police force disregarded a congressional joint resolution providing for protection, the marchers were jostled and harassed by crowds that had gathered along the march route. Rowdies surged into the procession from the sidewalks, blocking its passage and affronting the marchers. A suffragist leader said "The terrible treatment we have received shows how badly we need the ballot... Women are better able to govern this city than it has been governed today."

During her career as a union organizer and relief worker, Craton frequently advocated for women's rights in opposition to the AFL and its associated unions. One source contends that the male union members and their leaders viewed women workers and their supporters as competitors rather than colleagues. In 1927, in reviewing a book on women workers, Croton wrote: "The male workers have pledged themselves again and again to 'give every consideration' to [women's] membership in such unions from which they have been excluded... This reviewer, as an organizer of women workers, feels strongly that the organization of women can be accomplished most successfully by women... Women must be organized, and Theresa Wolfson's book proves that women can best do that work."

Writing in 1928 about the Passaic textile strike of 1926, Craton told an interviewer: "Women are better at this sort of thing than men. They are more courageous than men. They will do more and suffer more. One of the distinctive sights in the Passaic strike was that of women with baby carriages leading the picket lines. Organize the women along with the men. Teach them to maintain the picket lines, and to organize collections, and let them learn to speak."

The papers of Ann Blankenhorn in the Archives of Labor and Urban Affairs at Wayne State University include an unfinished manuscript from the 1920s called "Fact Finding" in which she mentions a social club she helped organize that, in the words of one source, "kept open the discussion of women’s equality, politics, and changing sexual morality". (Note: The name chosen for the group, Royal Bengal Bicycle Club, was one that was in fairly common use at the time for informal groups formed to foster light-hearted and unfettered discussion. An article in the Washington Times-Herald published in 1927 calls the one that Craton helped to found, "a sprightly group organized for the purpose of giving occasional parties". The name was meant as a joke since, as was said of another club, "none of the members rode a bicycle or had ever been to Bengal.")

=== Writings ===
During the early 1920s, Craton wrote articles for progressive and radical newspapers and magazines. In publications such as The Nation, The New Republic, Labor Age, Daily Worker, The Liberator, and New Masses, she summarized the abuses and obfuscations of mill owners and gave vivid accounts of women's work lives and union activities. These writings included:

"Golden Rule Bunk in the Nash Factory; Manufacturer Capitalizes "Golden Rule" and Makes it Return Profits", Oregon Labor Press, January 6, 1922, page 6.

In this article, Craton discussed a garment manufacturer's attempt to fend off unionization by claiming his practices followed Christian principles and were fair to workers. She called the attempt a cynical advertising ploy and said his business paid the lowest wages in town.

"The Golden Rule Shop As Labor Sees It", The Labor Bulletin, February 2, 1922, page 5.

In this article, Craton says the public relations success of the owner of the "Golden Rule Shop" concealed the fact that he paid his workers $4.00 to $6.00 less than union wages.

"Rats: An Organizer's Story", The Nation, August 30, 1922, pages 204–205.

"Rats", Craton says in this article, was the union members' "favorite name for the private detectives who were hired by a clothing manufacturer to make our lives wretched during a recent organization campaign and strike in Scranton, Pennsylvania." The article concludes with this paragraph: "Private detective agencies are increasing daily and their work is becoming more and more menacing to all labor organizations through the use of stool-pigeons, gangsters, professional strike-breakers, and agents provocateurs, but the Rats, the ridiculous defective detectives for whose services the employers pay such large sums for the intimidation of union organizers, in the hope that they will fearfully and disgustedly abandon their work, will never prevent labor organization. Often the Rats provide the one bit of comic relief in the strenuous life of an organizer. For if an organizer works day and night it is for an ideal, a faith, a daring dream. And a Rat for $4 a day tags along to try and prevent it!"

"B.V.D's", The Liberator. February 1923, pages 24–26.

This article follows a group of teenage girls who began a strike entirely on their own and continued it with Craton's help after she had found out about it. It ends by describing their sustained optimism after a downturn in the clothing industry caused the strike to fail.

"Coal Dust and Shirts", Labor Age, March 1924, pages 8–10.

In this article, Craton explains how clothing manufacturers were exploiting the wives and daughters of coal miners in rural northeast Pennsylvania whom they employed in what were then called "run-away" shops. She tells how eagerly these women took to organizing and how militant they were in maintaining a year-long strike until the industry downturn forced the shops to close.

"Those Terrible Americans", New Masses, October 1926, pages 18–19, 28–29.

This article contrasts a group of native-born American women in the garment industry of New England with the more numerous women workers from immigrant families. She discusses the frustration of union leaders, themselves immigrants and all of them men, with the straight-laced, church-going New Englanders who refused to stop work during a major strike. Craton recognized that the women would never agree to join picket lines, but she found they could be convinced the strike was needed and would agree to support it in other ways.

"Bertha, the Sewing-Machine Girl", The Nation, December 29, 1926, pages 689–690.

In this article, Craton describes working conditions in the high-end custom dress industry of Manhattan. Despite resistance from employers and frequent arrests for disturbance of the peace, Craton and other organizers succeeded in many respects. Craton writes: "Many new shops were organized, and a strong sentiment for unionization and higher standards was established among the women workers in all of the leading houses. Wages started going up, the forty-four-hour week was generally established for the unorganized dressmakers, while the tailors and organized dressmakers won the forty-hour week besides wage increases."

"Recent Outstanding Achievements Among Working Women", Daily Worker, March 8, 1927, page 6.

This is a summary of union achievements among women workers in New York City during the middle years of the 1920s. It concludes: "Let us realize keenly that the responsibility for improving the conditions of our exploited fellow workers is upon our own shoulders. Let us face facts squarely. Women must act for themselves. The organization. of women must be accomplished by women. The question of the position of women in the trade unions was never more dominant and challenging than today. The New York trade union women have a tremendous fight ahead of them, but there seems to be great promise for the future. 1927 should be a year of solid and able achievement in the advancement of women workers."

"With Women Workers". Daily Worker, March 14, 1927, page 6.

This article focuses on the celebration of International Women's Day, on March 8, 1927, in Manhattan.

"Working the Women Workers", The Nation, March 23, 1927, pages 311–313.

Using case histories, Craton describes the cold shoulder that the American Federation of Labor and its male-dominated garment workers' unions gave to women organizers and union members. She summarizes an encounter with one AFL official: "He used all the old arguments to discourage us: women could not be organized; women did not want to be organized; women had been organized, at great trouble and expense, and their unions had not lasted." She quoted him as saying, "Why don't you forget all this business and leave the labor movement to men? It's too rough for women. Why don't you get married?... If you want to organize women, you'll have to wait until the federation gets around to it. We think the time isn't ripe yet. It will not be for another twenty-five or fifty years."

"Facing the Famine Line", The Nation, April 4, 1928, pages 373–374.

Craton writes about the desperate need for relief services among families in the bituminous coal fields of western and central Pennsylvania during a lengthy miners' strike.

"Want to Make a Revolution, Missus?", The Nation, February 2, 1933, page 124.

This article illustrates Craton's experience as an investigator for New York's Temporary Emergency Relief Administration among the women in a Bronx tenement of Italian immigrants. It focuses on the difficulties families were facing during the early years of the Depression when any job was welcome even if it did not provide a living wage. She describes the reaction of the women she spoke with when confronted with a doctrinaire radical who was trying to gain support for a "revolution" among the urban poor. In a light-hearted concluding paragraph, she writes: "The neighbors gathered around were indulging in excited, angry conversation. It seemed that they were discussing the tactics of making a revolution. Mrs. Capucci believed that it meant going to street meetings and reading papers. Mrs. Farino, who had joined us by this time, disagreed. You registered for the Democrats so that your man did not lose his job, but you voted for the Communists. Mrs. Albertini insisted that you threw milk bottles at the police. Mrs. Giovannini, whose man had never got a relief job and who had had no home relief despite being investigated twelve times, wanted to go to the Home Relief Bureau and chase out the investigators and take the food tickets. It appeared to be time to intervene. I suggested that if it were to be that sort of revolution, Mr. Hoover might call out the troops as he had done in Washington against the bonus marchers. Their faces were blank. No one had heard of Mr. Hoover's making a revolution. Some of them could read Italian newspapers, but who had pennies today for newspapers? The children brought home American papers picked up in the streets but they only read jokes to their mothers. All the women became indignant at their children for reading jokes when the soldiers and Mr. Hoover were making a revolution."

== Personal life and family ==
Craton was born on September 1, 1891, in North Carolina. Craton's father was Richard Washington Craton. Born about 1865 in North Carolina and died in 1943 in Kentucky, he was an insurance salesman who traveled frequently and frequently lived apart from his wife and children. (Note: The 1870 US Census lists Richard W. Craton, then age 5, living with his mother and no other relatives in Piney Grove, NC. The 1910 Census shows him living with his wife and children in Parkersburg, West Virginia. The 1930 and 1940 Censuses show him boarding by himself in Beattyville, Kentucky. When one of his daughters died in 1941, her obituary made no mention of her father and when his wife died in 1942, her obituary made no mention of her husband. A letter he wrote to the editor of a newspaper shows that he was alive in March 1941.) Craton's mother was Margaret A. Hillyar Craton. The daughter of Rev. James M. Hillyar, an Episcopal minister, she was born in 1867 and died in 1942. Craton was the oldest of three brothers and two sisters, all born between 1893 and 1899. (Note: This information comes from news accounts accessed via newspapers.com and the ancestry.com database of genealogical records. Craton's brothers were Richard Washington Craton (1893–1932), James Hillyar Craton (1896–1956), and Marshall D. Craton (1899–1980). Her sisters were Margaret E. Craton (1903–1941 ) and Grace Douglas Craton (1904–1999).)

As manager of the girls' varsity basketball team at George Washington University in 1914, Craton tried to set up a league to create a structure for the games the team played.

While working as a union organizer in Pottsville, Pennsylvania, in 1919, Craton began what would become a lifelong friendship with Mary Heaton Vorse and when, at the end of her life, Vorse needed financial and emotional support, Craton provided it. Craton lived in Provincetown, Massachusetts, in the summers of the early 1930s. In 1930 and 1931, she operated a dining room on Pearl Street in that town. She also took in boarders and hosted evening sessions for summer students in the various schools of the Provincetown art colony.

In 1936, Craton married Heber Blankenhorn. Early in his career, he had been a newspaper reporter and union activist, and he had, like Craton, been a publicity director of the Amalgamated Clothing Workers' Union. (Note: Heber Blankenthorn had served in World War I and subsequently was a military propaganda specialist for the US Army. During the Depression, he was a public relations specialist for activities carried out under the National Recovery Act and later assisted congressional committees as an investigator.) During her married life, Craton carried out some research on social conditions in coal mining areas and assembled materials for a biography of her husband. She completed neither of these tasks before her death.

During a 1920 court case, Craton's lawyer described her as "modest and retiring and petite, not weighing more than 90 pounds". A writer for The Liberator called her a "plucky, blue-eyed, hard-headed, big-hearted lineal descendent of George Washington" in 1922.

Craton died in 1970.
