= Edward Keating =

American politician

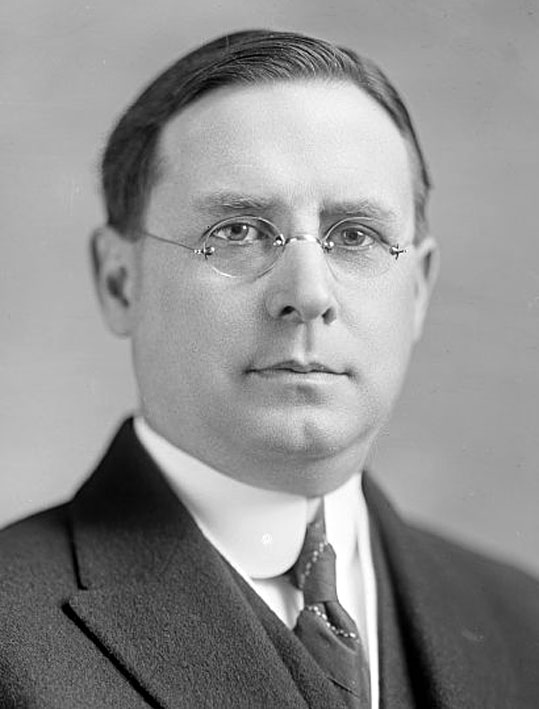

Member of the U.S. House of Representatives from Colorado
- In office March 4, 1913 – March 3, 1919
- Preceded by: District established
- Succeeded by: District eliminated (AL); Guy U. Hardy (3rd)
- Constituency: At-large district (1913-15); 3rd district (1915-19)

Personal details
- Born: July 9, 1875 Kansas City, Kansas
- Died: March 18, 1965 (aged 89) Washington, D.C.
- Resting place: Cedar Hill Cemetery in Suitland, Maryland
- Party: Democratic Party

Edward Keating (July 9, 1875 – March 18, 1965) was an American newspaper editor and politician. In turns a Colorado newspaper editor, U.S. representative (1913–1919) from Colorado, advocate for better conditions for the working class, and long-time editor (1919–1953) of the newspaper Labor (jointly owned by several railroad unions), Keating engaged in many political campaigns throughout the United States to elect union-friendly legislators.

== Early life ==
Edward Keating was born to Irish immigrants Stephen Keating, a widower, and Julia O’Connor Quinlan, a widow, on a small farm near Kansas City, Missouri. When his father died, his mother moved with him to Pueblo, Greeley, and eventually Denver, Colorado, where he attended public school until he decided to quit school and look for work. He married Mrs. Margaret Sloan Medill, September 1, 1907, who died February 15, 1939. On May 3, 1941, he married Eleanor Mary Connolly (1889–1977). Both marriages were childless.

At age 14, Keating became a copyholder on the Denver Republican. He was city editor of The Denver Times 1902–1905, and editor of Rocky Mountain News 1906–1911. Keating purchased the Pueblo Leader in 1912. He was president of the Denver Press Club from 1905–1907, and of the International League of Press Clubs in 1906 and 1907.

== Political career ==
Although Keating began his political career by being active in the Populist Party, by the mid-1890s he had joined the Democrats and remained a Democrat the rest of his life. He was city auditor of Denver 1899–1901. In 1903 he was a member of the first convention elected to draft a charter for the city of Denver. During 1911–1913 he was President of the Colorado State Board of Land Commissioners.

=== Congress ===
Elected as a Democrat to the 63rd, 64th, and 65th Congresses (March 4, 1913 – March 3, 1919). In the 65th Congress, Keating was chairman of the Committee on Expenditures in the Post Office Department. He was unsuccessful in his bid for reelection in 1918.

In 1916, Keating and Senator Robert L. Owen (D-OK) co-sponsored a bill called the Keating–Owen Child Labor Act of 1916, which restricted the interstate commerce of goods produced by children. The act was declared unconstitutional in Hammer v. Dagenhart; nevertheless, it is regarded as a landmark in the story of the regulation of child labor in the United States. Several states already had child labor laws, but these varied widely. Although bills regulating child labor had been introduced in previous congressional sessions, they did not pass. The Keating-Owen bill was the first to become a law and thus became the first federal intervention in the tackling of the child labor problem. Later many of the provisions of the Keating-Owen Act were incorporated into other labor legislation, which was upheld by the Supreme Court.

In April 1917, Keating was one of 50 congressmen who voted against the House Resolution for War against Germany. In 1919, he introduced the Keating War Powers Bill to regulate child labor in certain industries.

== After politics ==
He was a member of the Congressional Joint Committee on Reclassification of Salaries for Civilian Employees in the District of Columbia from March 1919 to April 1920. Keating was campaign manager in 1919 for the Plumb Plan, sponsored by the Plumb Plan League.

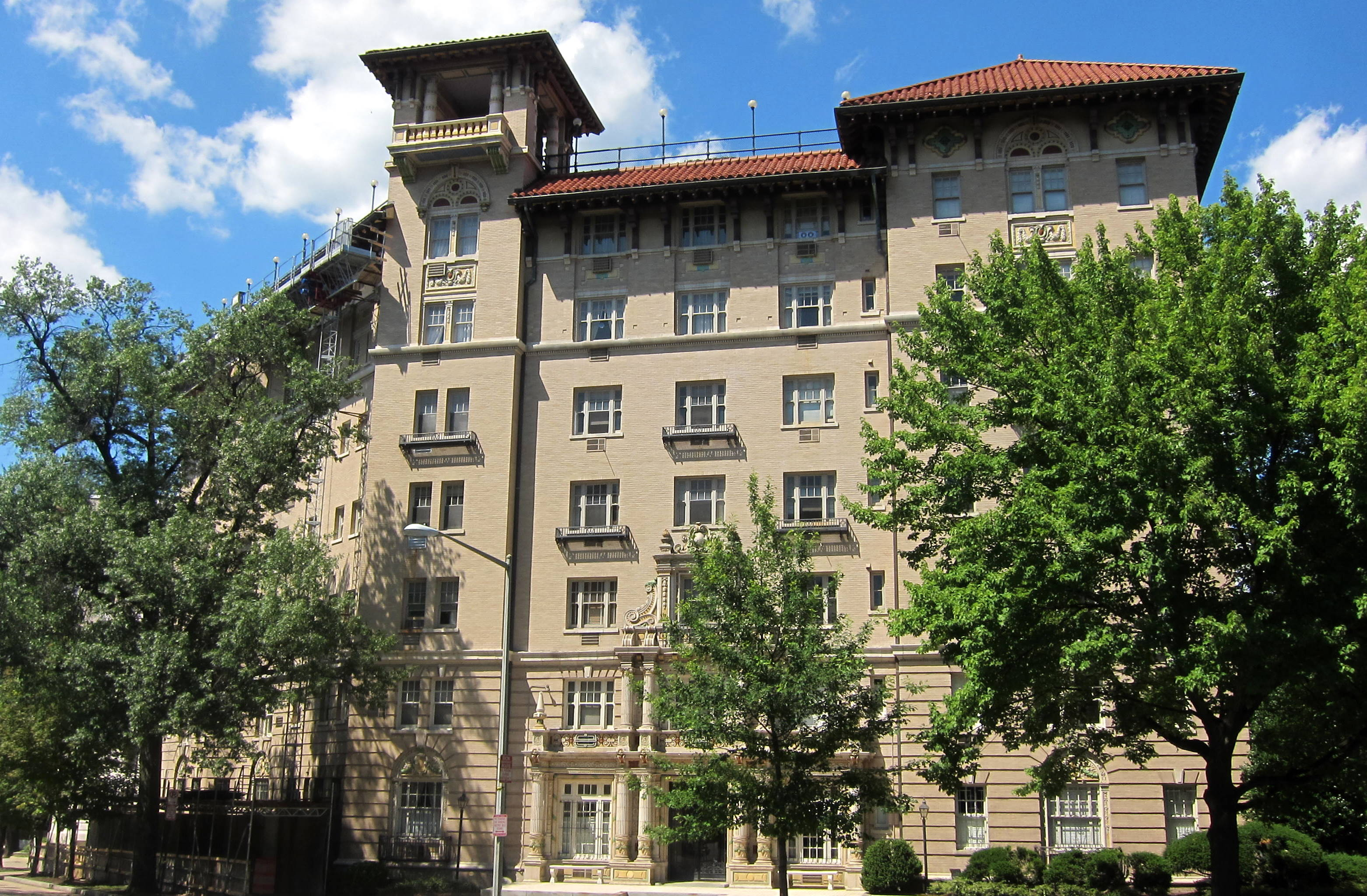
Keating's former residence in Washington, D.C. at 2311 Connecticut Ave. NW (2010 photo).

When the national weekly paper Labor was founded in Washington, D.C. in 1919 by fifteen associated railroad labor organizations, Keating became its editor and manager. He continued in those capacities until his retirement on April 1, 1953.

Under the pen name Raymond Lonergan, he contributed a weekly Washington column for the Chicago Tribune during most of his years as Labor's editor. In the book The Story of Labor: Thirty-three Years on Rail Workers’ Fighting Front (1953), Keating reminisced about his years as editor of Labor and the numerous political campaigns it became involved in.

Keating's The Gentleman from Colorado, a memoir (1964) was less a coherent autobiography and more a series of reminiscences about people and incidents Keating was connected with. Many of the stories have a what-really-happened behind the scenes slant. It contained five sections: early life, newspaper and political stories, interesting people, congressional experiences, and the railroad unions.

Huey Long wrote in his book My First Days in the White House that he wanted Keating to be Secretary of Labor were he to become president.

== Death ==
Keating died in Washington, D.C., March 18, 1965. He was interred at Cedar Hill Cemetery in Suitland, Maryland. He was Roman Catholic.

== Electoral history ==
1914 United States House of Representatives elections
Party	Candidate	Votes	%
Democratic	Edward Keating	37,191	53%
Republican	Neil N. McLean	32,567	47%
Total votes		69,758	100%
Democratic win (new seat)			

1916 United States House of Representatives elections
Party	Candidate	Votes	%
Democratic	Edward Keating (Incumbent)	40,183	54%
Republican	George E. McClelland	31,137	42%
Socialist	David McGrew	2,492	3%
Progressive	William G. Francis	443	1%
Total votes		74,255	100%
Democratic hold			

== Notes ==
U.S. House of Representatives
Preceded by Seat created	Member of the U.S. House of Representatives from Colorado's at-large congressional district 1913–1915	Succeeded by District inactive
Preceded by District created	Member of the U.S. House of Representatives from Colorado's 3rd congressional district 1915–1919	Succeeded by Guy Urban Hardy
