= Doyle v. Mitchell Bros. Co. =

- Supreme Court of the United States

Argued March 4–6, 1918 Decided May 20, 1918
- Full case name: Doyle, Collector of Internal Revenue v. Mitchell Bros. Co.
- Citations: 247 U.S. 179 (more) 38 S. Ct. 467; 62 L. Ed. 1054; 1918 U.S. LEXIS 1968; 1 U.S. Tax Cas. (CCH) ¶ 17; 3 A.F.T.R. (P-H) 2979

Case history
- Prior: Judgment for plaintiffs, 225 F. 437 (W.D. Mich. 1915); aff'd by 235 F. 686 (6th Cir. 1916); rehearing denied by 239 F. 719 (6th Cir. 1917)

Court membership
- Chief Justice Edward D. White Associate Justices Joseph McKenna · Oliver W. Holmes Jr. William R. Day · Willis Van Devanter; Mahlon Pitney · James C. McReynolds; Louis Brandeis · John H. Clarke

Case opinion
- Majority: Pitney, joined by unanimous

Laws applied
- Corporation Excise Tax Act of 1909, § 38, 36 Stat. 112

Doyle v. Mitchell Bros. Co., 247 U.S. 179 (1918), was a United States Supreme Court case defining gross income. The case held that gross income includes the gain on sale of assets, i.e., the proceeds less cost basis. An alternative theory that gross income should be the gross proceeds, and the cost basis should be allowed as a deduction, was rejected by the Court. The Court also held that the harvesting of timber was not an income recognition event until the timber was sold.

== Background ==
In 1909, Congress enacted a tax on net income of corporations. Much of the language defining gross income in that law has been retained in current tax law. Thus, court decisions interpreting the meaning of that law may have continuing relevance.

Mitchell Bros. was a timber producer organized in 1903. Upon passage of the predecessor to current income tax law, the company became subject to tax on net income. Mitchell Bros. held various timber lands from which it harvested timber. After harvesting, the timber and land would be sold separately. The Court addressed questions of when income from timber was to be included in taxable income and how taxable income from sale of the land was to be calculated.

== Opinion of the Court ==
On the gross income question, the Court stated in paragraph 13, "In order to determine whether there has been gain or loss, and the amount of the gain if any, we must withdraw from the gross proceeds an amount sufficient to restore the capital value that existed at the commencement of the period under consideration."

On the timing question, the Court found, in paragraph 17, that the mere harvesting of timber did not give rise to income. The Court held that income from the timber should be recognized when the timber was sold.
