= Edward Thomas Devine =

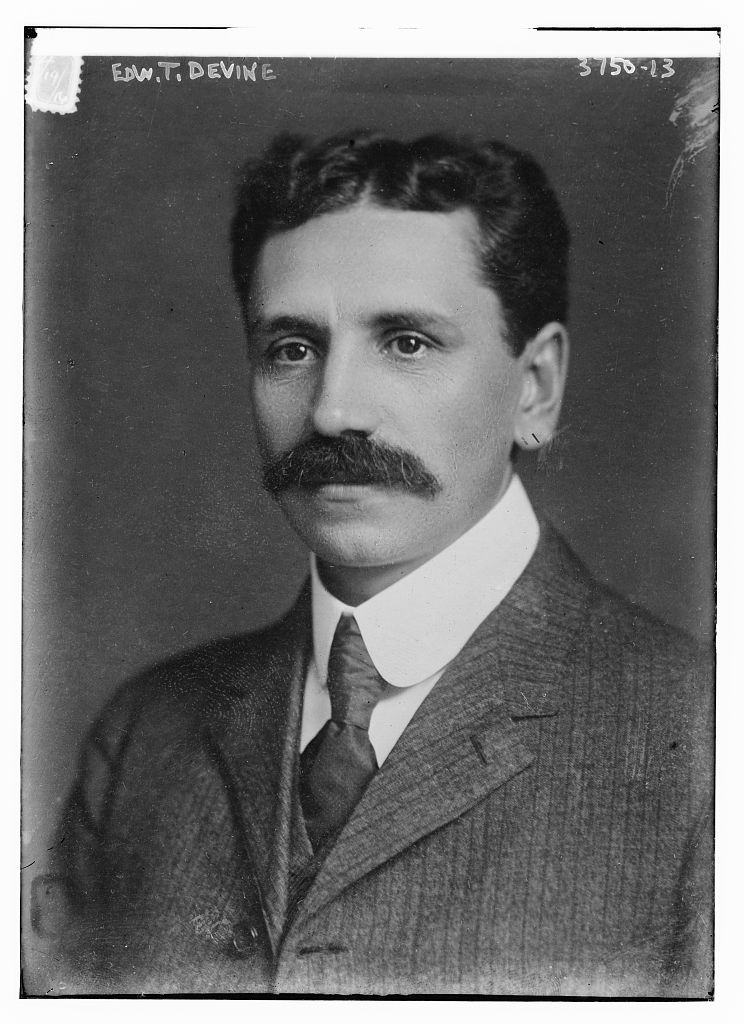
Edward Thomas Devine circa 1915

Edward Thomas Devine (May 6, 1867 – February 27, 1948) was a professor at Columbia University and American University who advocated for social welfare.

== Background ==
Edward Thomas Devine was born on May 6, 1867, on a farm near Union, Iowa to John Devine of Ireland and Laura Hall of New York state. He attended Cornell College, where he received a B.A. in 1887 and a M.A. in 1889. In 1889, the University of Pennsylvania awarded him a Ph.D. in economics.

== Career ==
While studying for his doctorate, Devine became staff lecturer in economics for the American Society for the Extension of University Teaching, for which he also became secretary (1894–1896).

In 1896, Devine became general secretary of the New York City chapter of the Charity Organization Society (COS). The school expanded from summer- to full-time curriculum. It became the New York School of Philanthropy and eventually the Columbia University School of Social Work. Devine served there twice as director, 1904-1907 and 1912–1917, and also as professor of social economy, 1905–1919. COS achievements associated with Devine include: tenement house committee (1898), New York State Tenement House Act (1901), tuberculosis committee (1902), Department for the Improvement of Social Conditions (1907), and committee on criminal courts (1910).

In 1904, outside of COS, Devine helped found a National Child Labor Committee as well as the National Association for the Study and Prevention of Tuberculosis. In 1910, he joined an advisory committee of the International Prison Congress. In 1912, he became chairman of a committee of social workers who lobbied successfully for passage of an act that created the federal Commission on Industrial Relations.

Devine served on disaster relief efforts by the American Red Cross, 1906–1917.

Devine served on the Federal Coal Commission, 1922–1923. Devine was dean of the graduate school and a professor of social economics at American University from 1926 to 1928. He directed Bellvue-Yorkville Health Demonstration, 1929–1930. He became director of the Housing Association of New York and vice chairman of the New York Committee of One Thousand ("a private reform body to investigate political corruption in New York City"), 1930–1931. He served as executive director of the Nassau County Emergency Work Bureau, 1931–1933, and of the country's Emergency Relief Bureau, 1933–1935.

== Personal life and death ==
In 1889, Devine married Hattie Evelyn Scovill; they had two surviving children.

Devine died age 79 on February 27, 1948, in Oak Park, Illinois.

== Works ==
In 1897, Devine founded and edited the journal Charities Review. In 1905, it merged with Commons and in 1906 with Jewish Charity to emerge in 1907 as Survey.
