= Bailey v. Drexel Furniture Co. =

- Supreme Court of the United States

Argued March 7–8, 1922 Decided May 15, 1922
- Full case name: J. W. Bailey and J. W. Bailey, Collector of Internal Revenue for the District of North Carolina v. Drexel Furniture Company
- Citations: 259 U.S. 20 (more) 42 S. Ct. 449; 66 L. Ed. 817; 1922 U.S. LEXIS 2458; 3 A.F.T.R. (P-H) 3156; 1922-2 C.B. 337; 21 A.L.R. 1432; 1922 P.H. ¶ 17,023

Case history
- Prior: Error to the District Court of the United States for the Western District of North Carolina

Holding
- Congress improperly penalized employers for using child labor.

Court membership
- Chief Justice William H. Taft Associate Justices Joseph McKenna · Oliver W. Holmes Jr. William R. Day · Willis Van Devanter; Mahlon Pitney · James C. McReynolds; Louis Brandeis · John H. Clarke

Case opinions
- Majority: Taft, joined by McKenna, Holmes, Day, Van Devanter, Pitney, McReynolds, Brandeis
- Dissent: Clarke

Bailey v. Drexel Furniture Co., 259 U.S. 20 (1922), was a United States Supreme Court case in which the Court ruled the 1919 Child Labor Tax Law unconstitutional as an improper attempt by Congress to penalize employers using child labor. The Court indicated that the tax imposed by the statute was actually a penalty in disguise.

The Court later abandoned the philosophy underlying the Bailey case. For example, see United States v. Kahriger, 345 U.S. 22 (1953), overruled on other grounds, Marchetti v. United States, 390 U.S. 39 (1968).

== Background ==
On February 24, 1919, Congress passed the Child Labor Tax Law which imposed an excise tax of 10 percent on the net profits of a company that employed children. The law defined child labor as "under the age of sixteen in any mine or quarry, and under the age of fourteen in any mill, cannery, workshop, factory, or manufacturing establishment." The definition also included the use of children between the ages of fourteen and sixteen who worked more than eight hours a day or more than six days a week, or who worked between the hours of 7:00 p.m. and 6:00 a.m. Drexel was a furniture manufacturing company in North Carolina.

On September 21, 1921, a collector from the Bureau of Internal Revenue (now the Internal Revenue Service) assessed $6,312.79 in excise taxes for employing a child under fourteen during the 1919 tax year. Drexel paid the tax under protest and sued for a refund.

== Procedural history ==
Drexel's main argument was that the tax was an unconstitutional attempt to regulate manufacturing. The United States argued that, the statute, as an indirect tax, did not need to meet a standard as long as it was geographically uniform. In addition, the government contended that the tax was merely an excise tax levied by Congress under its broad power of taxation under Article One of the Constitution. The lower court ruled in favor of the company.

== Holding ==
Chief Justice Taft's Court declared the tax on child labor was unconstitutional because it was a disguised criminal penalty, not a tax, on employment of children. In addition, the Child Labor Tax Law is a regulation on businesses instead of a tax.

Taft argued the law describes a set course for businesses and when they deviate from that course, a payment is enacted. Taft said, "Scienters are associated with penalties, not with taxes." "[A] court must be blind not to see that the so-called tax is imposed to stop the employment of children within the age limits prescribed." Taft said that the court must commit itself to the highest law of the land and the duty of the court, even though it requires them to refuse legislation designed to promote the highest good. He went on to say that the good sought in unconstitutional legislation leads citizens and legislators down a dangerous path of breaching the constitution and recognized standards. In addition, Congress could take control of many areas of public interest, which the States have control over reserved by the Tenth Amendment, by enacting regulating subjects and enforcing them by a so-called "tax." This would break down the constitutional limitations on Congress and eliminate the sovereignty of States. A tax is a source of revenue for the government, while a penalty is a regulation and punishment for a certain behavior.

== Implications ==
One possible criticism is that the decision in Drexel was a reversal of the Supreme Court's position on excise taxes since the early 19th century and that this decision is out of line with Supreme Court rulings before and after. As a general rule, the court repeatedly favored the federal power to tax. In other cases, the court has upheld Congress's excise tax on narcotics, marijuana, and firearms. Even with the firearms case, the Court admitted the law was unmistakably a legislative purpose to regulate rather than tax.

Despite this reversal of philosophy regarding Congress's ability to regulate through the tax code, the Court's definition of the Child Labor Tax as a penalty due to its characteristics featured prominently in the majority opinion in National Federation of Independent Business v. Sebelius, penned by Chief Justice John Roberts in 2012. The opinion holds that the individual mandate at the center of the Patient Protection and Affordable Care Act does not fulfill any of the characteristics (i.e., the heavy burden of tax for even slight infractions, the requirement of scienter in levying the tax, and the use of the Department of Labor to aid in enforcement) that allowed the Court to consider the Child Labor Tax as outside of Congress' "Power To lay and collect Taxes, Duties, Imposts and Excises", and therefore, the individual mandate may be considered within that power.

Previously, in Hammer v. Dagenhart, 247 U. S. 251, the Court ruled a law prohibiting the transportation in interstate commerce of goods manufactured with child labor was unconstitutional. After the court rejected both attempts by Congress to regulate child labor, Congress proposed a constitutional amendment which would give the national government the power to regulate and prohibit child labor, without a deadline for ratification by the states. The proposed amendment was never ratified, as it was made unnecessary by state child labor laws, and a later reversal of the Bailey decision after a suit against Section 212 of the Fair Labor Standards Act, which prohibited the transportation of goods in interstate commerce made from "oppressive child labor."

== See also ==
- List of United States Supreme Court cases, volume 259
- Lochner era
- Lochner v. New York (1905)
