= Owen Reed Lovejoy =

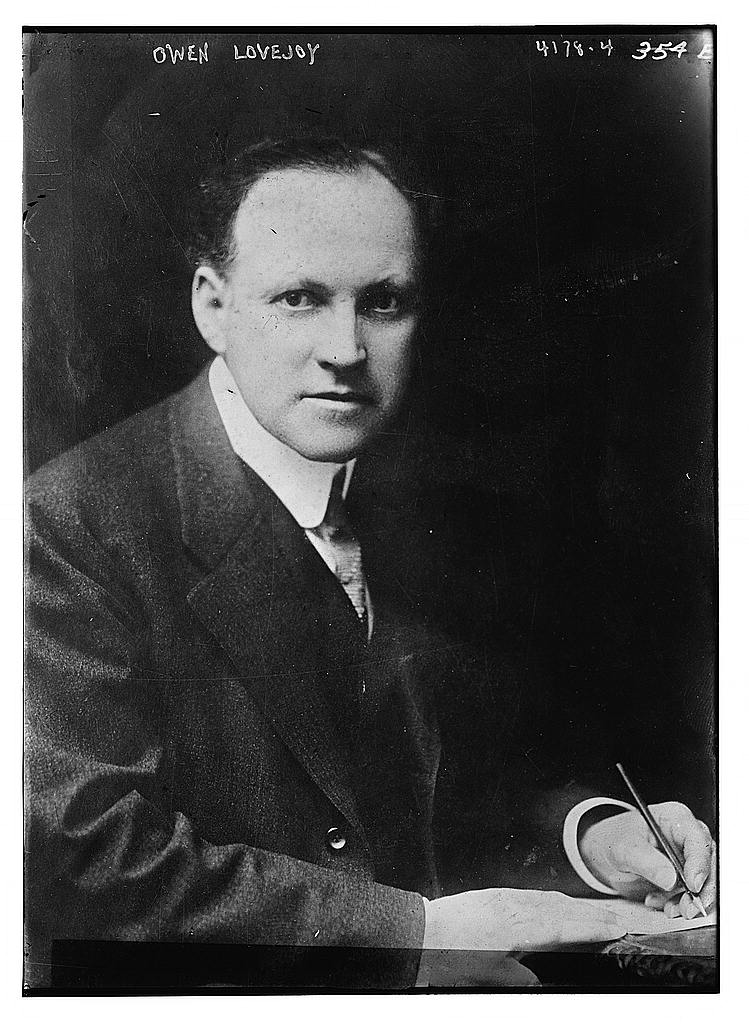
- Lovejoy in 1917
- Born: September 9, 1866; Jamestown, Michigan
- Died: June 29, 1961 (aged 94); Biglerville, Pennsylvania
- Education: Albion College
- Occupation: Minister
- Spouse: Jennie Evelyn Campbell
- Parent(s): Hiram Reed Lovejoy, Sr. Harriett Helen Robinson

Owen Reed Lovejoy, Jr. (September 9, 1866 – June 29, 1961) was a minister who opposed child labor. He was known as the "children's statesman". He served as the general secretary of the National Child Labor Committee from 1907 to 1926.

== Biography ==
He was born on September 9, 1866, in Jamestown, Michigan to Hiram Reed Lovejoy, Sr. and Harriett Helen Robinson. He attended Albion College. On June 30, 1892, he married Jennie Evelyn Campbell and they had five children, but only two of his sons survived to adulthood. In 1904 he joined the National Child Labor Committee and served until 1926. He then went to work for the Children's Aid Society. His wife died in 1929. In 1937 he married Kate Calkins Drake. He retired in 1939 and moved to Biglerville, Pennsylvania.

He died on June 29, 1961, in Biglerville, Pennsylvania.

== Publications ==
- Lovejoy, Owen R. (1912). "Child Labor and the Home". The Masses: A Monthly Magazine Devoted to the Interests of the Working People. No. May (News Stand ed.). New York City: The Masses Publishing Company. pp. 11, 18 – via Internet Archive.
