= United States v. Darby Lumber Co. =

- Supreme Court of the United States

Argued December 19–20, 1940 Decided February 3, 1941
- Full case name: United States v. Darby Lumber Co.
- Citations: 312 U.S. 100 (more) 61 S. Ct. 451; 85 L. Ed. 609; 1941 U.S. LEXIS 1222; 3 Lab. Cas. (CCH) ¶ 51,108; 132 A.L.R. 1430

Case history
- Prior: 32 F. Supp. 734 (S.D. Ga. 1940); probable jurisdiction noted, 60 S. Ct. 1105 (1940).

Holding
- The Fair Labor Standards Act of 1938 was a constitutional exercise of Congressional power under the Commerce Clause.

Court membership
- Chief Justice Charles E. Hughes Associate Justices Harlan F. Stone · Owen Roberts; Hugo Black · Stanley F. Reed; Felix Frankfurter · William O. Douglas; Frank Murphy

Case opinion
- Majority: Stone, joined by unanimous

Laws applied
- Commerce Clause, Necessary and Proper Clause, Fair Labor Standards Act
- This case overturned a previous ruling or rulings
- Hammer v. Dagenhart, 247 U.S. 251 (1918)

United States v. Darby Lumber Co., 312 U.S. 100 (1941), was a case in which the United States Supreme Court upheld the Fair Labor Standards Act of 1938, holding that the U.S. Congress had the power under the Commerce Clause to regulate employment conditions. The unanimous decision of the Court in this case overturned Hammer v. Dagenhart, 247 U.S. 251 (1918), limited the application of Carter v. Carter Coal Company, 298 U.S. 238 (1936), and confirmed the underlying legality of minimum wages held in West Coast Hotel Co. v. Parrish, 300 U.S. 379 (1937).

== Background ==
An American lumber company based in Georgia was charged with violating the conditions set forth in the Fair Labor Standards Act of 1938 aiming to fix minimum wages and maximum hours for employees engaged in the production of goods for interstate commerce. The company successfully appealed when an appellate judge ruled that the federal government is barred by the Tenth Amendment from interfering in matters that are strictly local and within state boundaries.

Darby Lumber, located in Statesboro, Georgia, was founded by entrepreneur Fred Darby in 1919 after the conclusion of World War I. After buying some land from a defunct oil company, Mr. Darby turned his lumber company into one of the premier companies in the area with over 50 employees. The company benefited from the forested land of South Georgia and easy railroad access to nearby Savannah and not too distant Macon. During the boom of the 1920s, and even the bust of the 1930s, Darby Lumber prospered so well that in 1938 it was able to expand its operations. The expansion, which included larger facilities and an increased payroll, garnered resources that would make the operations of the company much more efficient.

The Darby case came about due to violations of the Fair Labor Standards Act of 1938 (FLSA), one of many initiatives enacted by President Franklin Roosevelt during the Great Depression and, to date, the most comprehensive to dictate the running of corporations. Roosevelt wanted to unite labor practices in all of the states, as he considered that leaving that power to the states had been ineffective.

There was some concern on how the new law would affect the viability of businesses. It was passed in August 1938 and signed into law by Roosevelt two months later. The Commerce Clause addressed businesses that conducted both intrastate and interstate commerce. The law established a federal minimum wage, the 44-hour work week standard (this being the slightly longer precedent for the current 40-hour standard), and overtime pay (which remains in effect, requiring employers to pay their hourly employees at least 150% of their normal wages for work in excess of the standard).

== Issues ==
One issue was whether Congress had overstepped its constitutional authority in creating the Fair Labor Standards Act.

Another issue was that the Act required the keeping of records to verify compliance; the appellee argued that this violated his Fifth Amendment right protecting him from self-incrimination.

== Decision ==
The Court unanimously reversed the appellate court decision and affirmed the constitutional power of Congress to regulate interstate commerce, which "can neither be enlarged nor diminished by the exercise or non-exercise of state power." The Court held that the purpose of the Act was to prevent states from using substandard labor practices to their own economic advantage by interstate commerce. In Hammer v. Dagenhart, the Court had made the distinction between manufacturing and interstate commerce so a business could argue it was engaging in the former but had not intended the latter.

In the current case, the Court found that earlier argument facile and explained that Congress was aware that businesses produce their goods without thought to where they will go, and product is pulled and shipped to meet the orders of the day. The Court also concluded that the requirement to keep records was entirely appropriate, as a matter of enforcing the Act.

The Court ruled that Congress could require companies to conform to production regulation under the FLSA. The Court also ruled that the employer could be held responsible for transgressions of the law and that the employer had to keep a record of his compliance with the law.
