= Hammer v. Dagenhart =

- Supreme Court of the United States

Argued April 15–16, 1918 Decided June 3, 1918
- Full case name: Hammer, United States Attorney for the Western District of North Carolina v. Dagenhart, et al.
- Citations: 247 U.S. 251 (more) 38 S. Ct. 529; 62 L. Ed. 1101; 1918 U.S. LEXIS 1907; 3 A.L.R. 649

Case history
- Prior: Appeal from the District of the United States for the Western District of North Carolina

Holding
- Congress has no power under the Commerce Clause to regulate labor conditions.

Court membership
- Chief Justice Edward D. White Associate Justices Joseph McKenna · Oliver W. Holmes Jr. William R. Day · Willis Van Devanter; Mahlon Pitney · James C. McReynolds; Louis Brandeis · John H. Clarke

Case opinions
- Majority: Day, joined by White, Van Devanter, Pitney, McReynolds
- Dissent: Holmes, joined by McKenna, Brandeis, Clarke

Laws applied
- Keating-Owen Act of 1916; Commerce Clause of the U.S. Const.
- Overruled by
- United States v. Darby Lumber Co., 312 U.S. 100 (1941)

Hammer v. Dagenhart, 247 U.S. 251 (1918), was a United States Supreme Court decision in which the Court struck down a federal law regulating child labor. The decision was overruled by United States v. Darby Lumber Co. (1941).

During the Progressive Era, public sentiment in the United States turned against what was perceived as increasingly intolerable child labor conditions. In response, Congress passed the Keating–Owen Act, prohibiting the sale in interstate commerce of any merchandise that had been made either by children under the age of fourteen, or by children under sixteen who worked more than sixty hours per week. In his majority opinion, Justice William R. Day struck down the Keating–Owen Act, holding that the Commerce Clause did not give Congress the power to regulate working conditions. In his dissenting opinion, Justice Oliver Wendell Holmes Jr. argued that the fact that the goods had been manufactured by children was immaterial to whether shipping them across State lines was interstate commerce, and thus Congress should have power to regulate the interstate shipment of those goods.

== Background ==
During the Progressive Era, public sentiment in the United States turned against what was perceived as increasingly intolerable child labor conditions. Activities of such groups as the National Child Labor Committee, investigative journalists, and labor groups called attention to unhealthy and unsafe working conditions. Historical material presented by the Smithsonian Institution provides a sense of the motivation behind these concerns in an electronic exhibit on the work of the photographer Lewis Hine:

Over and over, Hine saw children working sixty and seventy-hour weeks, by day and by night, often under hazardous conditions. He saw children caught in a cycle of poverty, with parents often so ill-paid that they could not support a family on their earnings alone, and had to rely on their children's earnings as a supplement for the family's survival. He saw children growing up stunted mentally (illiterate or barely able to read because their jobs kept them out of school) and physically (from lack of fresh air, exercise, and time to relax and play). He saw countless children who had been injured and permanently disabled on the job; he knew that, in the cotton mills for example, children had accident rates three times those of adults.

Responding to the growing public concern, many states sought to impose local restrictions on child labor. In many states, however, the attempt to regulate was ineffective. In addition, manufacturers argued that where restrictions were imposed only in selected states, it placed them at a competitive disadvantage with competitors from states which still placed no restrictions.

Unable to regulate hours and working conditions for child labor within individual states, Congress sought to regulate child labor by banning the product of that labor from interstate commerce. The Keating-Owen Act of 1916 prohibited interstate commerce of any merchandise that had been made by children under the age of fourteen, or merchandise that had been made in factories where children between the ages of 14 and 16 worked for more than eight hours a day, worked overnight or worked more than sixty hours a week.

Roland Dagenhart, who worked in a cotton mill in Charlotte, North Carolina with his two sons, sued, arguing that this law was unconstitutional. A district court ruled the statute unconstitutional, which caused United States Attorney William C. Hammer to appeal to the Supreme Court. At issue was the question: Does Congress have the authority to regulate commerce of goods that are manufactured by children under the age 14, as specified in the Keating–Owen Act of 1916, and is it within the authority of Congress in regulating commerce among the states to prohibit the transportation in interstate commerce of manufactured goods by the child labor description above?

== Majority opinion ==
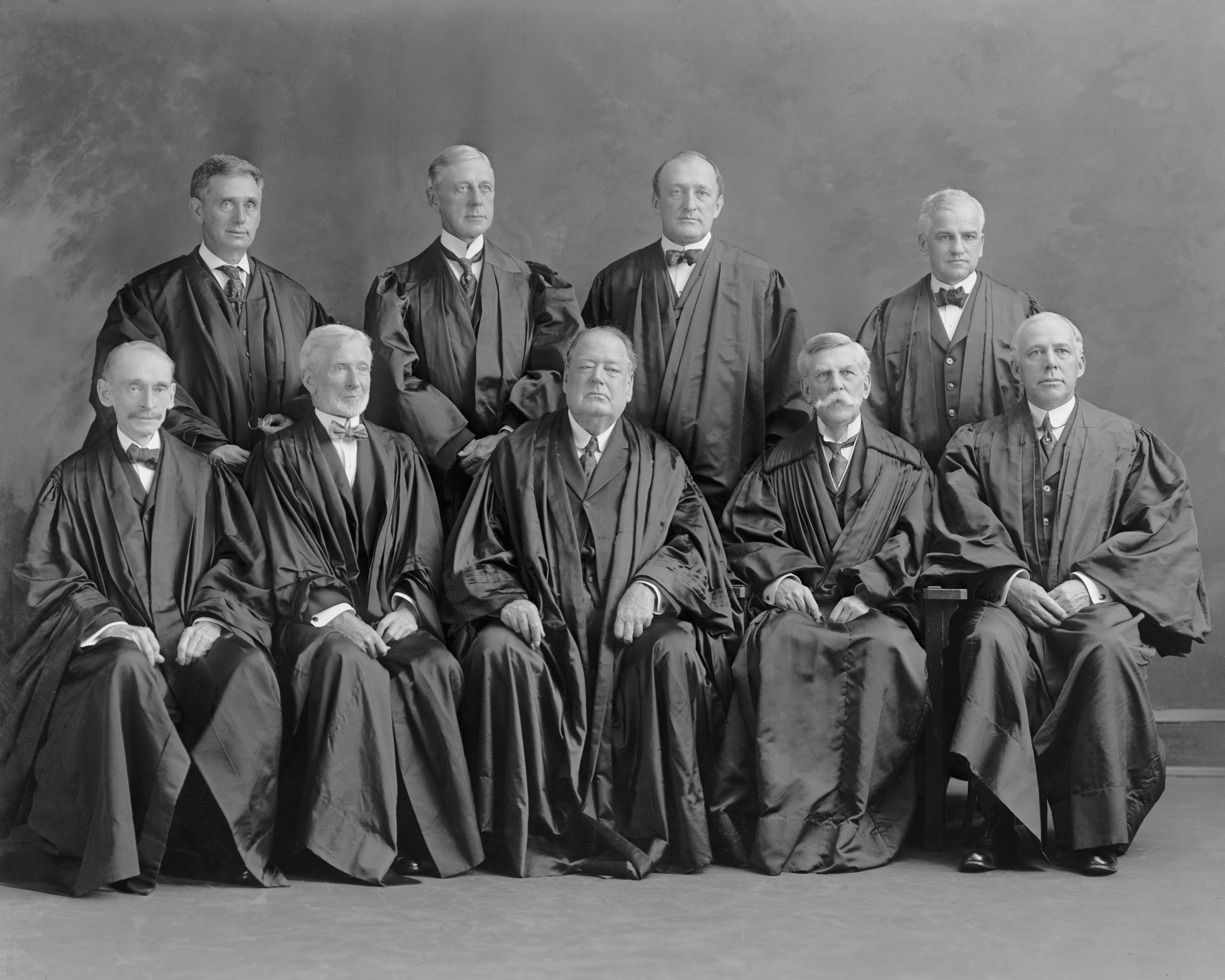
The White Court.

Justice Day, for the majority, said that Congress does not have the power to regulate commerce of goods that are manufactured by children and that the Keating-Owen Act of 1916 was therefore unconstitutional. Drawing a distinction between the manufacture of goods and the regulation of certain goods themselves "inherently evil", the Court maintained that the issue did not concern the power to keep certain immoral products out of the stream of interstate commerce, distinguishing previous cases upholding Congress's power to control lottery schemes, prostitution, and liquor. The Court reasoned that in those cases, the goods themselves were inherently immoral and thus open to congressional scrutiny. In this case, however, the issue at hand was the manufacture of cotton, a good whose use is not immoral. The Court further held that the manufacture of cotton did not in itself constitute interstate commerce. The Court recognized that disparate labor regulations placed the various states on unequal ground in terms of economic competitiveness, but it specifically stated that Congress could not address such inequality, as it was within the right of states to enact differing laws within the scope of their police powers:

It is further contended that the authority of Congress may be exerted to control interstate commerce in the shipment of childmade goods because of the effect of the circulation of such goods in other states where the evil of this class of labor has been recognized by local legislation, and the right to thus employ child labor has been more rigorously restrained than in the state of production. In other words, that the unfair competition, thus engendered, may be controlled by closing the channels of interstate commerce to manufacturers in those states where the local laws do not meet what Congress deems to be the more just standard of other states. The grant of power of Congress over the subject of interstate commerce was to enable it to regulate such commerce, and not to give it authority to control the states in their exercise of the police power over local trade and manufacture.

The court reasoned that "The commerce clause was not intended to give to Congress a general authority to equalize such conditions". The Court added that the federal government was "one of enumerated powers" and could not go beyond the boundary drawn by the 10th Amendment, which the Court misquotes by inserting the word "expressly":

In interpreting the Constitution, it must never be forgotten that the Nation is made up of States to which are entrusted the powers of local government. And to them and to the people the powers not expressly delegated to the National Government are reserved. ...

In our view the necessary effect of this act is, by means of a prohibition against the movement in interstate commerce of ordinary commercial commodities, to regulate the hours of labor of children in factories and mines within the states, a purely state authority. Thus the act in a two-fold sense is repugnant to the Constitution. It not only transcends the authority delegated to Congress over commerce but also exerts a power as to a purely local matter to which the federal authority does not extend.

== Dissenting opinion ==
Justice Holmes dissented strongly from the logic and ruling of the majority. He maintained that Congress was completely within its right to regulate interstate commerce and that goods manufactured in one state and sold in other states were, by definition, interstate commerce. That placed the entire manufacturing process under the purview of Congress, and the constitutional power "could not be cut down or qualified by the fact that it might interfere with the carrying out of the domestic policy of any State".

Holmes also took issue with the majority's logic in allowing Congress to regulate goods themselves regarded as immoral, while at the same time disallowing regulation of goods whose use may be considered just as immoral in a more indirect sense: "The notion that prohibition is any less prohibition when applied to things now thought evil I do not understand ... to say that it is permissible as against strong drink but not as against the product of ruined lives." At the time, the Eighteenth Amendment, banning the sale, manufacture and transport of alcoholic drink, had been approved by Congress and was being ratified by the states.

Holmes also commented on the court's rejection of federal restrictions on child labor: "But if there is any matter upon which civilized countries have agreed—it is the evil of premature and excessive child labor."

== Subsequent developments ==
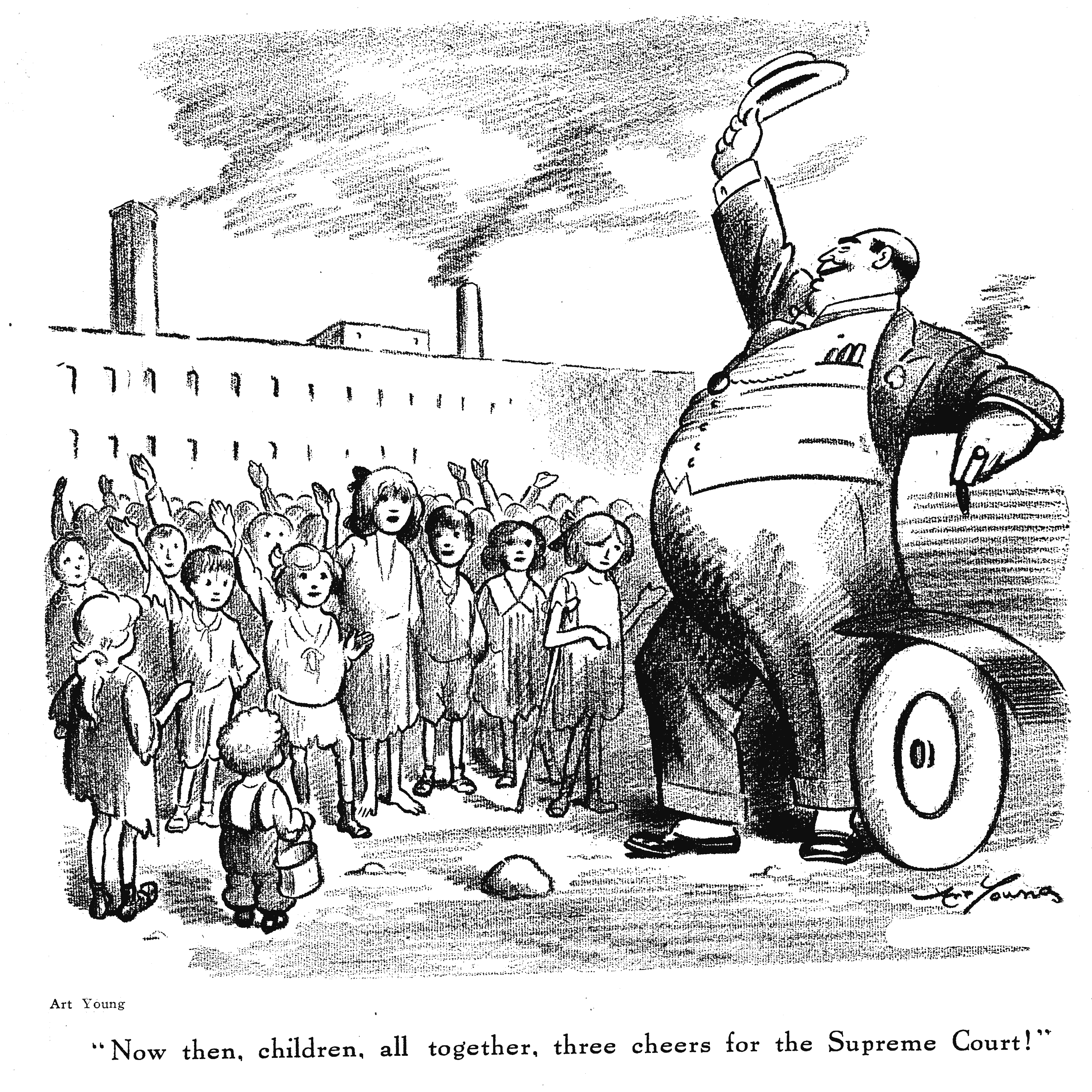
1918 cartoon from The Liberator protesting against this ruling

In 1922, another ruling, Bailey v. Drexel Furniture, banned Congress from levying a tax on goods produced through child labor entered into interstate trade; both rulings caused the introduction of the Child Labor Amendment.

The ruling of the Court was later overturned and repudiated in a series of decisions handed down in the late 1930s and early 1940s. Specifically, Hammer v. Dagenhart was overruled in 1941 in the case of United States v. Darby Lumber Co., 312 U.S. 100 (1941). The Court in the Darby case sided strongly with Holmes' dissent, which they called "classic". They also recast the reading of the Tenth Amendment, regarding it as a "truism" that merely restates what the Constitution had already provided for, rather than offering a substantive protection to the States, as the Hammer ruling had contended.
