= Keating–Owen Act =

U.S. federal legislation prohibiting child labor

- Long title: An act to prevent interstate commerce in the products of child labor, and for other purposes
- Nicknames: Wick's Bill
- Enacted by: the 64th United States Congress
- Effective: September 1, 1917

Legislative history
- Passed the House on February 2, 1916 (337-46); Passed the Senate on August 8, 1916 (52-12); Signed into law by President Woodrow Wilson on September 1, 1916

United States Supreme Court cases
- Hammer v. Dagenhart, 247 U.S. 251 (1918) in which the act was struck down by the Supreme Court on June 3, 1918.

The Keating–Owen Child Labor Act of 1916, also known as Wick's Bill, was a short-lived statute enacted by the U.S. Congress which sought to reduce child labor. It did so by prohibiting the sale in interstate commerce of goods produced by factories that employed children under 14, mines that employed children younger than 16, and any facility where children under 14 worked after 7:00 p.m. or before 6:00 a.m. or more than eight hours daily. After its original failure to be enacted, the bill was revised and re-introduced to Congress, where it was finally accepted. The basis for the action was the Commerce Clause, a constitutional clause giving Congress the task of regulating interstate commerce.

The Act specified that the U.S. Attorney General, the Secretary of Commerce, and the Secretary of Labor would convene a board to publish from time to time uniform rules and regulations to comply with the Act. To enforce the Act, the Secretary of Labor would assign inspectors to perform inspections of workplaces that produce goods for commerce. The inspectors would have the authority to make unannounced visits and would be given full access to the facility in question. Anyone found in violation of this Act or who gave false evidence would be subject to fines and/or imprisonment.

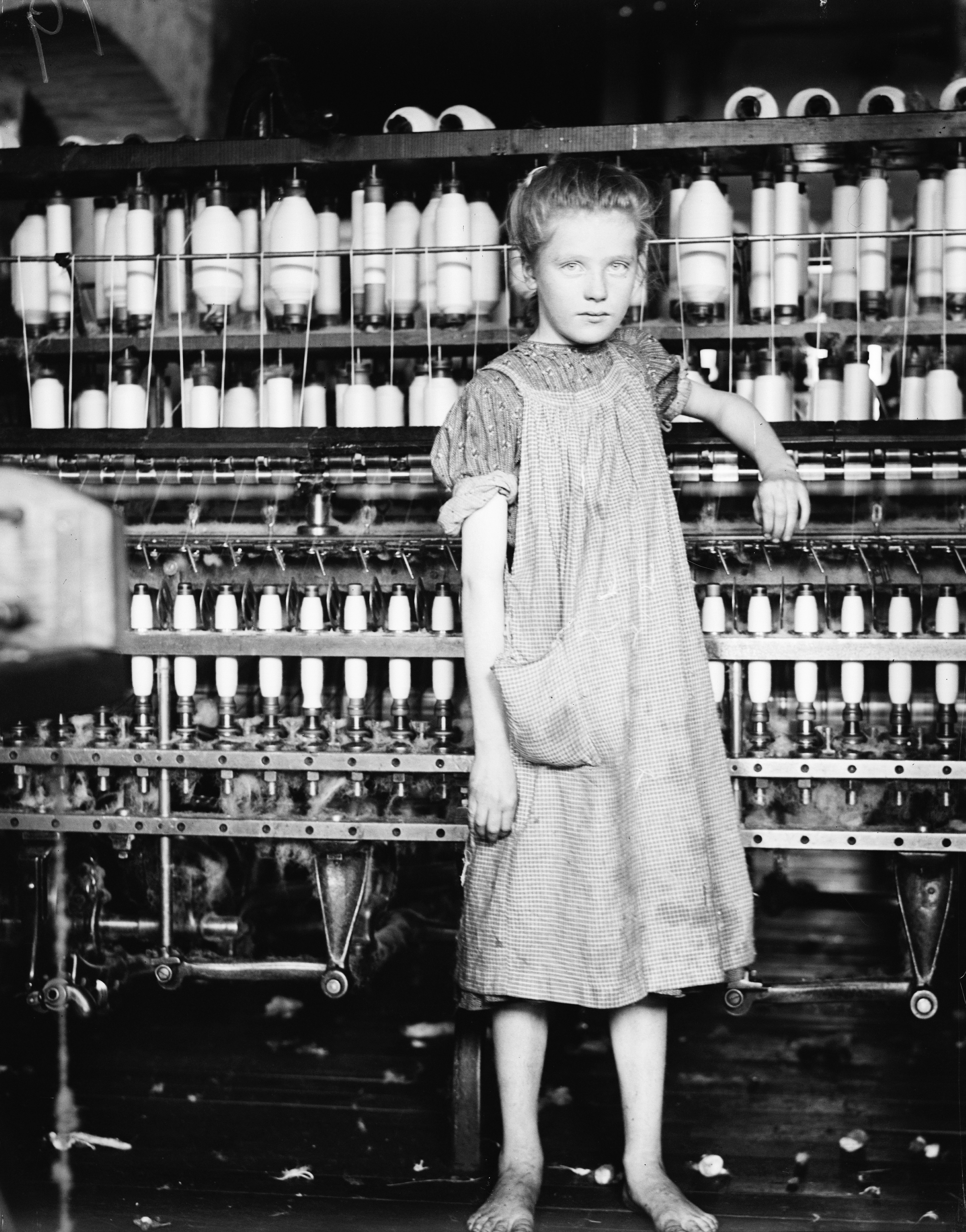
Lewis Hine's photography focusing on labor in America was among the factors that led to a change in attitudes about labor policy. This image was used on a 1998 US stamp to commemorate the passage of the Keating–Owen Act.

The bill was named for its sponsors: Edward Keating and Robert Latham Owen. The work of Alexander McKelway and the National Child Labor Committee (NCLC), it was signed into law in 1916 by President Woodrow Wilson, who had lobbied heavily for its passage, and went into effect on September 1, 1917. However, nine months later, in Hammer v. Dagenhart, 247 U.S. 251 (1918), it was ruled unconstitutional by the Supreme Court of the United States (see also Lochner era).
