= 1922 United States Senate election in Massachusetts =

- November 7, 1922
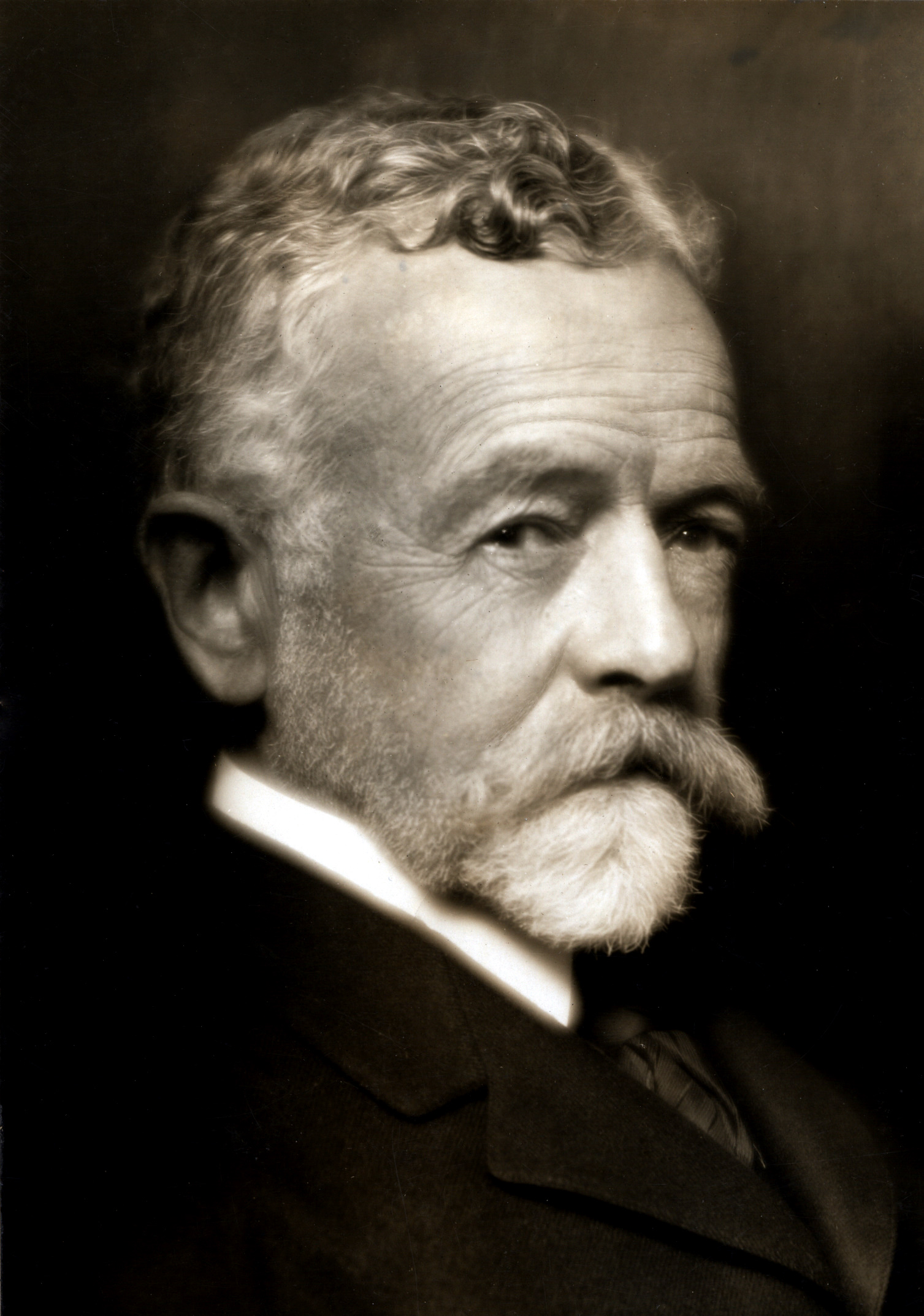

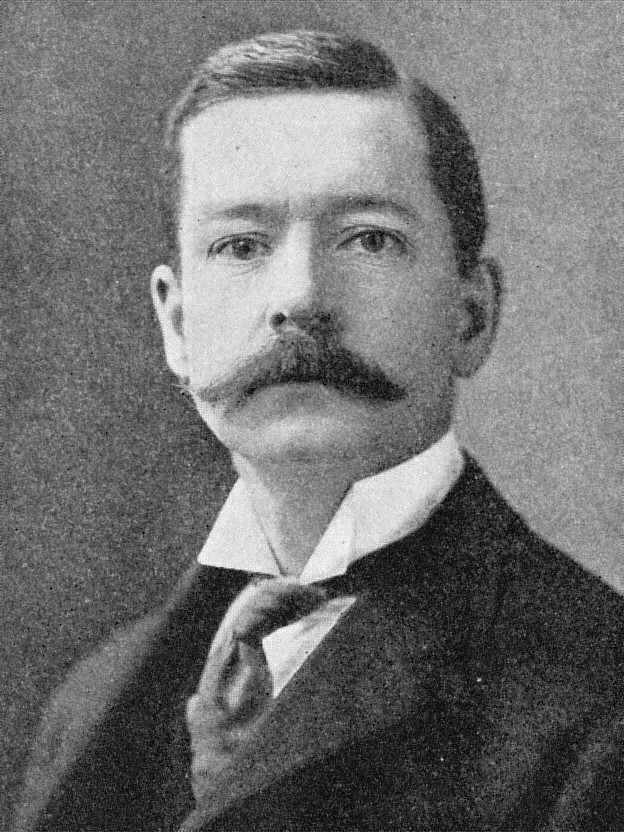
Nominee	Henry Cabot Lodge	William A. Gaston
Party	Republican	Democratic
Popular vote	414,130	406,776
Percentage	47.59%	46.67%
- Lodge: 40–50% 50–60% 60–70% 70–80% 80–90% >90% Gaston: 40–50% 50–60% 60–70% 70–80%
Senator before election
Henry Cabot Lodge
Republican
Elected Senator
Henry Cabot Lodge
Republican

The 1922 United States Senate election in Massachusetts was held on November 7, 1922. Republican incumbent Henry Cabot Lodge was narrowly re-elected to a sixth term in office over Democratic banker William A. Gaston.

== Republican primary ==
=== Candidates ===
- Henry Cabot Lodge, incumbent Senator and Senate Majority Leader
- Joseph H. Walker, former Speaker of the Massachusetts House of Representatives

=== Campaign ===
Walker accused Lodge of having "reactionary" tendencies and not properly representing the Republican Party.

=== Results ===
Republican Primary
Party	Candidate	Votes	%
Republican	Henry Cabot Lodge (incumbent)	209,599	75.27%
Republican	Joseph H. Walker	68,848	24.78%
Total votes		278,447	100.00%

== Democratic primary ==
=== Candidates ===
- William A. Gaston, nominee for governor in 1902 and 1903 and son of former Governor William Gaston
- Dallas Lore Sharp, author and Boston University professor
- John Jackson Walsh, former state senator and 1920 gubernatorial nominee
- Sherman L. Whipple, attorney and candidate for U.S. Senate in 1911 and 1913

=== Results ===
Democratic Primary
Party	Candidate	Votes	%
Democratic	William A. Gaston	88,134	51.48%
Democratic	Sherman L. Whipple	62,847	36.81%
Democratic	John Jackson Walsh	18,571	10.84%
Democratic	Dallas Lore Sharp	1,626	0.94%
Total votes		171,178	100.00%

== General election ==
=== Candidates ===
- Washington Cook, rubber manufacturer and brother of Alonzo B. Cook (Independent)
- William A. Gaston, nominee for governor in 1902 and 1903 and son of former Governor William Gaston (Democratic)
- Henry Cabot Lodge, incumbent Senator since 1893 (Republican)
- John A. Nicholls (Prohibition Progressive)
- John Weaver Sherman (Socialist)
- William E. Weeks, former Mayor of Everett (Progressive)

=== Campaign ===
Washington Cook ran on a platform that supported the League of Nations, women's suffrage, enforcement of the 18th Amendment, measures to stop the lynching of African-Americans in the south, creation of a national divorce law, and adequate compensation for soldiers.

=== Results ===
United States Senate election in Massachusetts, 1922
Party	Candidate	Votes	%	±%
Republican	Henry Cabot Lodge (incumbent)	414,130	47.59%	▼4.09
Democratic	William A. Gaston	406,776	46.67%	▲1.36
Prohibition	John A. Nicholls	24,866	2.85%	N/A
Socialist	John Weaver Sherman	11,678	1.34%	▼1.67
Independent	Washington Cook	7,836	0.90%	N/A
Progressive	William E. Weeks	4,862	0.55%	N/A
Total votes		870,148	100.00%	
