= United States Guards (1917) =

- Active: 1917–1919
- Country: United States
- Branch: National Army
- Type: Light infantry
- Role: Internal security, Rear guard
- Size: 28,160 (1918)

The United States Guards (USG) was a lightly armed, all-infantry military force maintained by the United States from 1917 to 1919. Tasked with an internal security and territorial defense mission within the Zone of the Interior, it was used to protect critical infrastructure and suppress civil unrest during World War I. Though it successfully defended more than 300 strategic sites during its brief existence, its use as a provost force was marked by violent clashes and the liberal use of lethal force. During a deployment in Butte, Montana, the United States Guards was accused by Thomas Watt Gregory, the Attorney-General of the United States, of imposing a "reign of terror" upon the city.

A component of the National Army, the United States Guards was composed of men over the age of 30 recruited from military veterans, police officers, and firefighters. At its largest, it consisted of approximately 28,000 personnel organized in 43 battalions.

== History ==
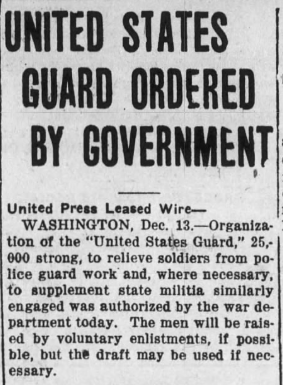
A December 13, 1917, newspaper article reports on the creation of the United States Guards

Territorial headquarters' of the Zone of the Interior

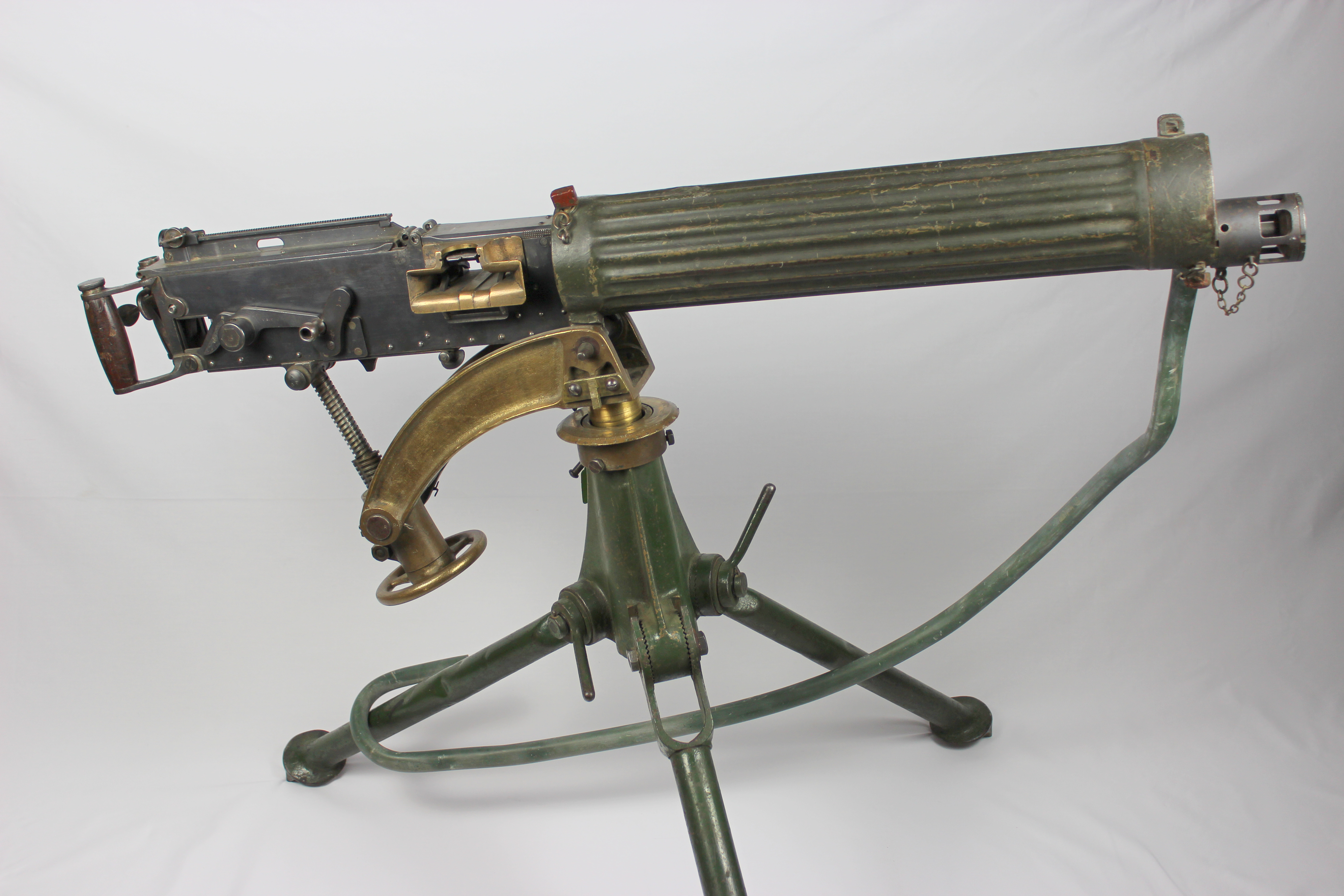
Crew-served weapons, such as the Vickers machine gun, were issued to USG units at the company level.

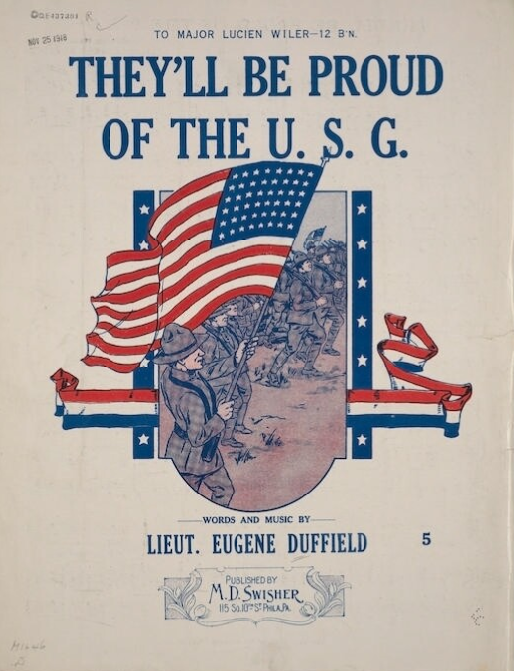
"They'll be Proud of the U.S.G." was composed by Eugene Duffield for the 12th Battalion, United States Guards. The cover to the 1918 printing of the song's sheet music is pictured.

Following the United States declaration of war on Germany (1917), a number of American states began mobilizing their respective military forces to guard critical infrastructure such as government facilities, munitions plants, and public utilities. On November 5, 1917, the United States Government called the militias of the various states into federal service in preparation for overseas deployment, thereby stripping the states of what military capabilities they possessed. In response, many states raised state defense forces to replace their deployed troops, numbers for which quickly swelled to 130,000. The U.S. government, meanwhile, took steps to provide for a federal force to replace the deployed United States Army and National Guard of the United States. On November 20, the United States Department of War issued General Order No. 147 which instructed that preparations be made for the territorial defense of the United States. The following month, the United States Guards were constituted as an all-infantry force and component of the National Army designed to serve a domestic mission. The first United States Guards unit raised was Company A, 6th Battalion, which was activated at the Presidio of San Francisco in December 1917.

Intake of personnel ended in November 1918, following which demobilization began. The last unit demobilized was the 30th Battalion, United States Guards – posted in the Territory of Alaska – which was deactivated in late 1919.

== Organization ==
=== Personnel ===
Personnel were aged between 31 and 40 years and were required to meet the same physical fitness requirements of the United States Army, though minor physical defects that would otherwise render them unfit for service were excused. According to a December 1917 article in The Morning Call, recruitment was targeted at combat veterans of the Spanish–American War and the Philippine Insurrection, as well as "men who are experienced in well organized fire and police departments". Pay for service in the United States Guards was equal to that of "other branches of the army".

=== Uniforms and equipment ===
While a distinctive United States Guards uniform was initially considered, this was abandoned after the public expressed distaste at the concept of a unique uniform for home guard troops. Personnel, instead, were issued standard U.S. Army uniforms with a "U.S.G." collar insignia in Gothic script. The United States Guards were armed with rifles and pistols of older or obsolete manufacture, with each company also issued several crew-served machine guns of varying make – including the Vickers machine gun – and ten riot shotguns.

=== Order of battle ===
The largest operating unit of the United States Guards was the battalion, of which 25 were initially created, each with an authorized strength of 633 personnel supported by an eight-person medical detachment. Battalions were raised within, and assigned to, the six departments comprising the Zone of the Interior, and reported to the department commander subject to doctrine and standards set by the Chief of the Militia Bureau. (Note: In addition to the United States Guards, most department commanders also had authority over several United States Army Coast Artillery Corps batteries and non-deployed National Guard units. Within the Southern Department and Western Department, some regular United States Army units were posted to fortify the Mexico–United States border.)

The order of battle, as of 1918, comprised 43 battalions unevenly split among the six departments.

==== Central Department, Zone of the Interior ====
- 5th Battalion, United States Guards
- 18th Battalion, United States Guards
- 26th Battalion, United States Guards
- 29th Battalion, United States Guards
- 36th Battalion, United States Guards
- 46th Battalion, United States Guards

==== Eastern Department, Zone of the Interior ====
- 1st Battalion, United States Guards
- 9th Battalion, United States Guards
- 10th Battalion, United States Guards
- 11th Battalion, United States Guards
- 12th Battalion, United States Guards
- 13th Battalion, United States Guards
- 14th Battalion, United States Guards
- 15th Battalion, United States Guards
- 16th Battalion, United States Guards
- 32nd Battalion, United States Guards
- 33rd Battalion, United States Guards

==== Northeastern Department, Zone of the Interior ====
- 3rd Battalion, United States Guards
- 7th Battalion, United States Guards
- 8th Battalion, United States Guards
- 27th Battalion, United States Guards
- 31st Battalion, United States Guards

==== Southern Department, Zone of the Interior ====
- 2nd Battalion, United States Guards
- 19th Battalion, United States Guards
- 20th Battalion, United States Guards
- 21st Battalion, United States Guards
- 22nd Battalion, United States Guards
- 39th Battalion, United States Guards
- 40th Battalion, United States Guards

==== Southeastern Department, Zone of the Interior ====
- 4th Battalion, United States Guards
- 17th Battalion, United States Guards
- 28th Battalion, United States Guards
- 35th Battalion, United States Guards
- 41st Battalion, United States Guards
- 42nd Battalion, United States Guards

==== Western Department, Zone of the Interior ====
- 6th Battalion, United States Guards
- 23rd Battalion, United States Guards
- 25th Battalion, United States Guards
- 30th Battalion, United States Guards
- 37th Battalion, United States Guards
- 38th Battalion, United States Guards
- 43rd Battalion, United States Guards
- 44th Battalion, United States Guards

== Operations ==
=== Civil unrest ===
USG troops were used to put-down several strikes led by the Industrial Workers of the World in 1917 and 1918. United States Attorney-General Thomas Watt Gregory protested the replacement of regular Army forces with United States Guards to control labor unrest in Butte, Montana, alleging that the USG oversaw a "reign of terror" in the city marked by unrestrained violence directed against protesters and strikers. The United States Guards were ultimately withdrawn and regular Army forces returned.

During a race riot in Winston-Salem, North Carolina on November 17, 1918, United States Guards troops were called out to reinforce local police in dispersing a white mob that had formed to lynch an African-American man being held in the city's jail. Gunfire was exchanged between the troops and the mob, the firefight eventually joined by armed, recently breeched boys. One soldier was wounded and more than two-dozen rioters and uninvolved onlookers killed and injured. The affray was ultimately suppressed with the support of tanks from Camp Polk.

=== Physical security ===
During its existence, United States Guards forces secured a total of 388 strategic sites including shipyards, government offices, bridges, dams, and mines.

== Music ==
To the Delaware-posted 12th Battalion, United States Guards – and its commanding officer Major Lucien Wiler – was dedicated an unofficial march composed by Lt. Eugene Duffield, "They'll be Proud of the U.S.G."

== Kahn et al. v. Anderson ==
The United States Supreme Court heard a case involving the United States Guards in 1920. In Kahn et al. v. Anderson, several United States Guards soldiers convicted by court martial of conspiracy to commit murder appealed their conviction on the grounds that USG officers were not qualified to sit as judges in courts martial, a contention the court rejected.

== Notable personnel ==
- Lloyd Thurston – Commissioned a captain and served with the 26th Battalion, United States Guards

== See also ==
- United States Guards
- Volunteer Training Corps
