= Sherman L. Whipple =

American attorney (1862–1930)

Sherman Leland Whipple
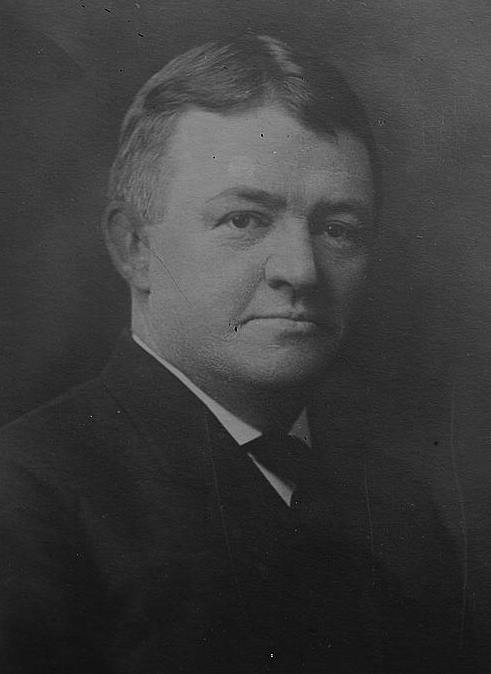
- Born: March 4, 1862; New London, New Hampshire
- Died: October 20, 1930 (aged 68); Brookline, Massachusetts
- Burial place: Walnut Hills Cemetery
- Education: Colby Academy; Yale College (1881); Yale Law School (1884)
- Occupation: Lawyer

Sherman Leland Whipple (March 4, 1862 – October 20, 1930) was an American attorney who was one of Boston's leading trial lawyers during his lifetime.

== Early life ==
Whipple was born on March 4, 1862, in New London, New Hampshire, to Dr. Solomon Whipple and Henrietta Hersey Whipple. He prepared for college at the Colby Academy and graduated from Yale College in 1881. After spending a year teaching math and Latin at the Boys' High School in Reading, Pennsylvania, Whipple resumed his studies and graduated from Yale Law School in 1884.

== Legal career ==
Whipple was admitted to the bar in 1884 and started his legal career in Manchester, New Hampshire, as an associate of David Cross. In May 1886 he moved to Boston. He was admitted to the Suffolk County bar in 1887. He founded the firm of Whipple, Sears, & Ogden.

In 1900, he represented a group of Central Massachusetts Railroad shareholders who dissented to its lease to the Boston and Maine Corporation.

From 1903 to 1905, he was the legal counsel to George W. Pepper, receiver of the Bay State Gas Company. He reportedly received a $220,000 fee for his work on the case.

In 1911, Whipple and Ralph S. Bartlett represented Olea Bull Vaughn, who contested the will of her mother, Sara Chapman Bull, on the grounds that her mother was not of sound mind and unduly influenced by members of the Vedanta Society when she agreed to give her entire $500,000 estate to the organization. On June 27, 1911, a settlement was reached that allowed Vaughn to receive the entire estate. The court confirmed the agreement on July 17, 1911. However, Vaughn, who was critically ill, died the following day, which led to the bulk of the estate going to Vaughn's adopted children.

In 1912, Whipple represented Jackson Palmer, a Lowell attorney convicted of perjury for allegedly giving false testimony to a grand jury investigating the Lowell Jail and its keeper, Harry E. Shaw. Whipple was able to get Palmer a new trial on the grounds that testimony from witnesses during his trial was inconsistent with testimony those same witnesses gave at a later trial.

Whipple represented Mary Cabot Briggs, who was contesting the will of her father Louis Cabot on the grounds that he had been unduly influenced by his valet, Edwin F. Woodward, to leave her out of the will due to a dispute between Woodward and Briggs' husband, Dr. L. Vernon Briggs. Whipple's opposing counsel was another prominent Boston attorney and a friend of Whipple's, Charles F. Choate Jr. The trial lasted ten weeks and saw testimony and depositions from 108 witnesses and the introduction of about 450 exhibits. On April 23, 1915, a jury completely sustained Cabot's will. Whipple intended on appealing, but a $33,900 settlement was reached to end the litigation and allow the estate to be paid out. Whipple received $25,000 of the $33,900.

Whipple was counsel for the Boston, Cape Cod, & New York Canal Company and in 1920 appeared before the United States Senate Committee on Commerce in support of legislation allowing the federal government to take over the Cape Cod Canal.

Whipple represented the sons of Thompson's Spa proprietor Charles S. Eaton when their father's widow contested his estate. The case was resolved three years after Eaton's death when a judge awarded Mrs. Eaton $300,000.

In 1920, Whipple represented Albert Victor Searles, who was contesting the $30 million estate of his uncle, Edward F. Searles. The parties reached an agreement and the Searles dropped his contest of the will. The terms of the agreement were not disclosed, but Searles was believed to have received a substantial part of the estate and Whipple was believed to have received a $500,000 fee.

In 1922, Whipple was lead counsel for Caleb Loring Cunningham, who was on trial for the murder of John Johnson. The defense argued that Cunningham shot Johnson, who was allegedly trespassing on Cunningham's property to steal wood, in self-defense because Cunningham believed Johnson was reaching for a gun in his pocket. Cunningham was found not guilty.

Whipple represented George F. Willett, who sued Kidder, Peabody & Co., F. S. Moseley & Co., Robert F. Herrick, and Daniel G. Wing for $15 million. Willett and his business partner took out a $2,992,000 loan from the defendants for their businesses - the American Felt Company and the Daniel Green Felt Shoe Company. Willett alleged that the defendants made the terms that forced them out of their business then managed the business so that they could take it over altogether. On December 18, 1924, after a lengthy trial, a jury awarded Willett $10,534,109. The case lingered until 1927, when the judgement was overturned by the Massachusetts Supreme Judicial Court.

In 1925, Whipple was counsel for Carlotta Cockburn, the alleged daughter of Lotta Crabtree's brother John Ashworth Crabtree. Cockburn was one of many people who unsuccessfully contested Crabtree's will.

Whipple represented creditors of the New England Oil Corporation in their suit against the corporation's noteholder's committee. On May 17, 1926, Judge George W. Anderson found that the noteholder's committee had damaged the value of the receivership by $6 million through "maladministration and fraudulent actions" and directed an execution of $3,327,740.48 to settle the claims. Whipple also represented the receivers of the New England Oil Corporation in their suit against Tanker Syndicate Inc., Old Colony Trust Co., Francis R. Hart, and Bradley Palmer seeking to invalidate a contract for oil tankers. The trial lasted 69 days (64 days of witness testimony and 5 days of arguments) and produced a 7,675-page transcript. 38 witnesses testified and 866 exhibits were placed in evidence. On June 29, 1928, nearly a year after the trial ended, Judge Julian Mack rejected the receivers' petition.

In 1926, Whipple and Elihu Root Jr. represented Hornblower & Weeks in the federal government's suit against them over the 1918 purchase of the Bosch Magneto Corporation from the Alien Property Custodian. The government alleged that the firm had a prearranged deal with the Alien Property Custodian to purchase the company at a price far lower than its actual value. The case was eventually dropped by Attorney General William D. Mitchell in 1930.

== Real estate ==
In addition to his legal work, Whipple was involved in real estate investing. In 1908 he purchased 11 properties, including the Hotel Buckingham, from Thomas G. Washburn. In 1914 he purchased the Commonwealth Trust Building, a two-story bank building on the corner of Summer and Devonshire streets in Boston. The Commonwealth Trust took out a 20-year lease on the property after selling it to Whipple. Whipple also owned a six-story commercial building at 61 Essex Avenue on the corner of Harrison Avenue in Boston, which he sold in 1917.

== Personal life ==
On December 27, 1893, Whipple married Louise Clough in Manchester, New Hampshire. They had three children, Dorothy, Katharyn, and Sherman Jr. Louise Whipple died on July 20, 1914, in Brookline, Massachusetts.

In 1903, Whipple purchased Clydehurst, a large-frame house on 9 acres (3.6 ha) of land in Brookline.

In 1910, Whipple purchased "The Forges", a country estate in Chiltonville, Massachusetts, from Eben Dyer Jordan. The 1,200-acre (490 ha) estate contained a large trout hatchery, a stream, three ponds, two greenhouses, a dairy farm, a pig farm, tennis courts, a carpentry shop, a blacksmith's shop, a grist mill, a twelve-room manager's house, twelve cottages, and a hall with a stage, library, and engine house. The main house, a large stone Elizabethan-style mansion designed by Wheelwright & Haven, contained a music room, billiard room, dining room, telephone room, school room, butler's room, servants' dining room, kitchen, pantry, refrigeration room, 16 bedrooms and 11 bathrooms for family and guests, and 6 bedrooms and two bathrooms for servants. In 1919 The Forges was threatened by fire, but was saved by a sudden veering of the wind.

== Politics ==
=== Senate runs ===
A lifelong Democrat, Whipple was the party's nominee in the 1911 United States Senate election. Whipple received 121 of the 280 votes cast by members of the Massachusetts General Court, 25 votes behind Republican incumbent Henry Cabot Lodge. In the 1913 election, Whipple received 80 votes, which put him in second place behind Republican John W. Weeks. In the 1922 election, Whipple finished second in the Democratic primary behind William A. Gaston.

=== Federal service ===
In 1917, the United States House Committee on Rules chose Whipple to conduct an inquiry into Thomas W. Lawson's allegations that members of the State Department had leaked advanced information on President Woodrow Wilson's World War I peace proposal to Wall Street traders. From 1918 to 1919, Whipple was the general counsel for the United States Shipping Board and Emergency Fleet Corporation. In 1919, Whipple and A. Mitchell Palmer were considered to succeed the retiring Thomas Watt Gregory as United States Attorney General. Wilson was ready to nominate Whipple, but Palmer's colleagues on the Democratic National Committee and recipients of his patronage during his tenure as Alien Property Custodian interceded on his behalf.

== Death ==
Whipple died unexpectedly on October 20, 1930, at his home in Brookline. He was survived by his three children and fifteen grandchildren. The funeral took place on October 22, 1930, at Trinity Church in Boston. Bishop Henry Knox Sherrill and William Lathrop Clark, rector of Saint Paul's Church in Brookline, conducted the services. He was buried at Walnut Hills Cemetery in Brookline. Although he was known for his work in will contests, Whipple himself did not leave a will.
