= 1914 United States Senate election in Pennsylvania =

- November 3, 1914
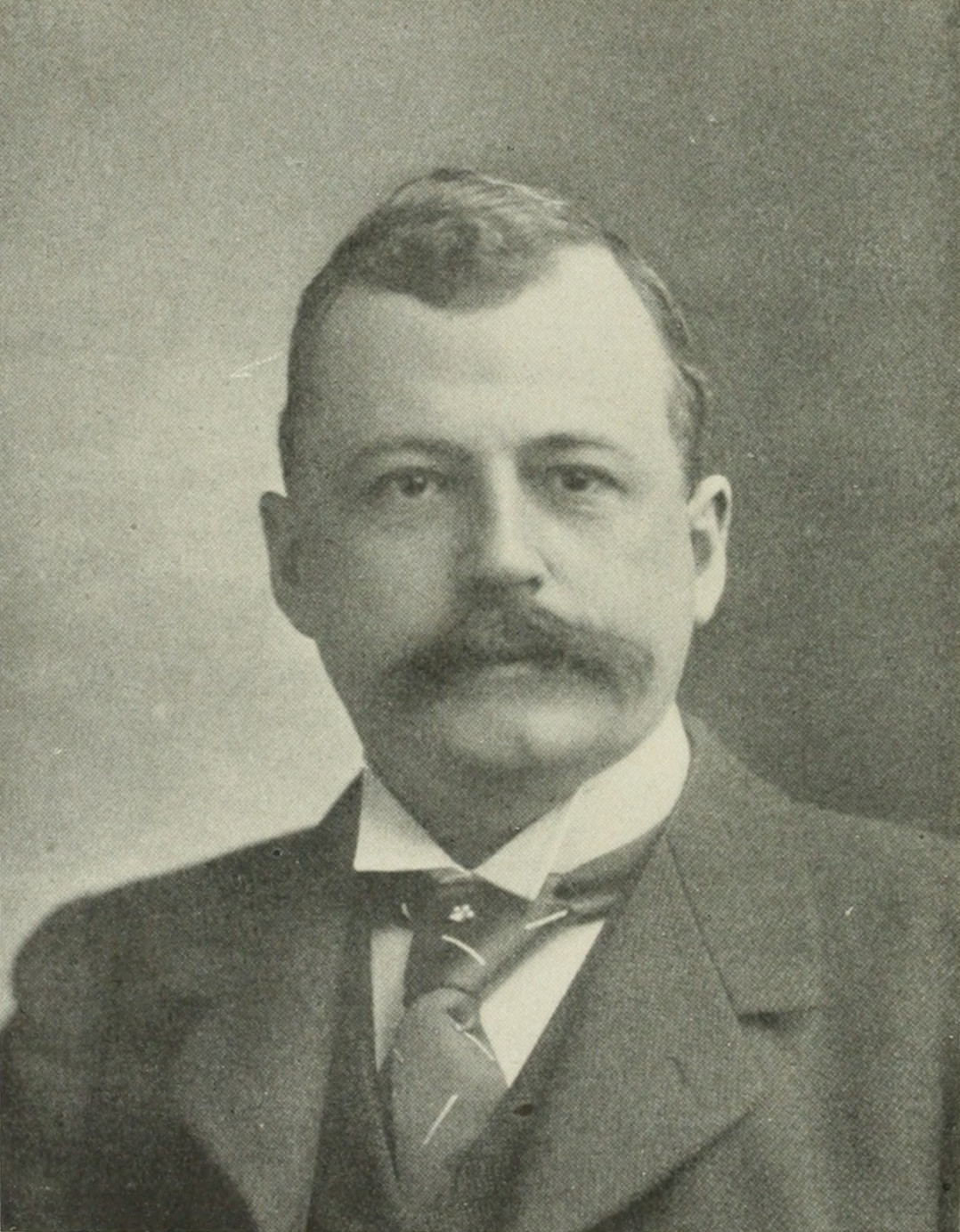

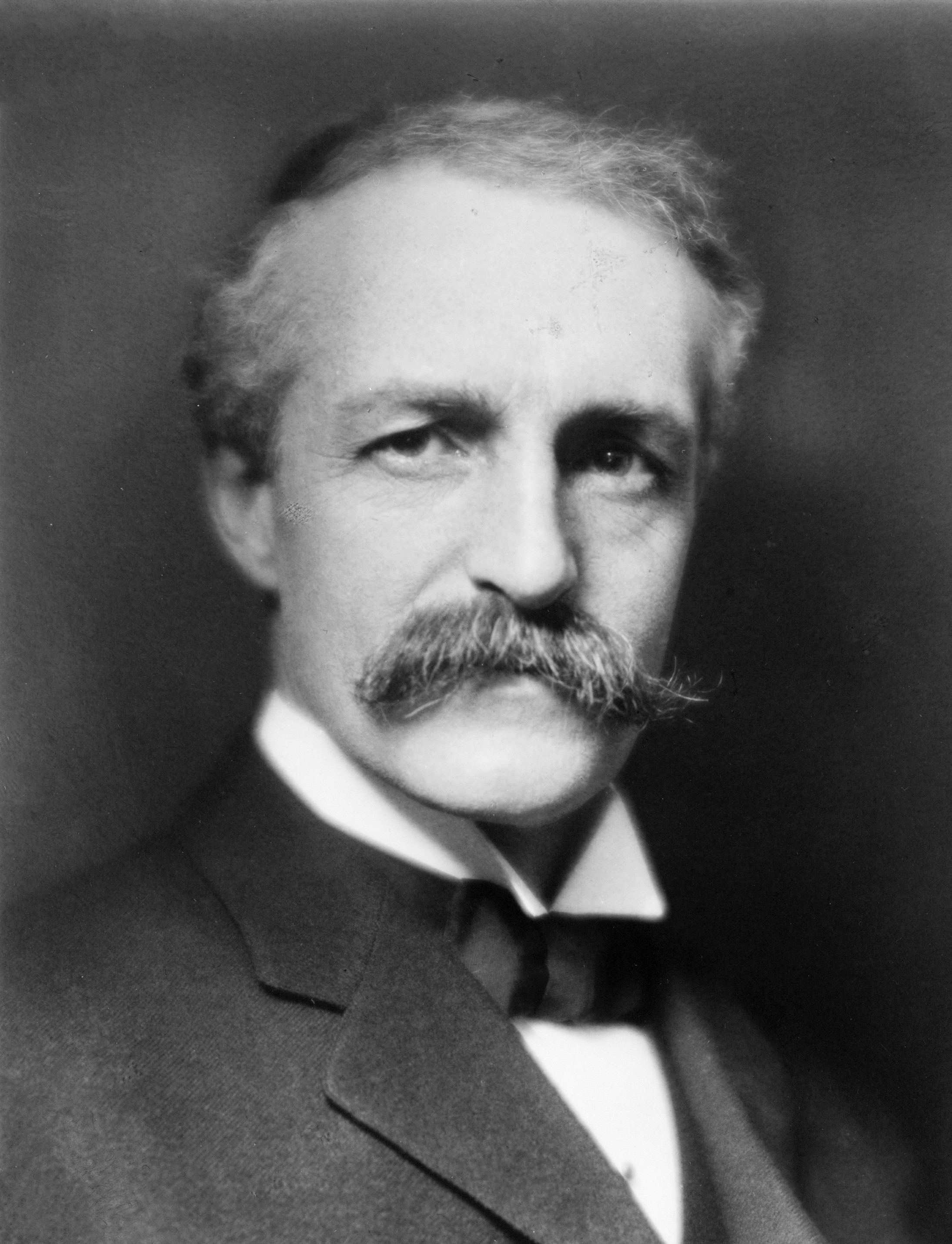

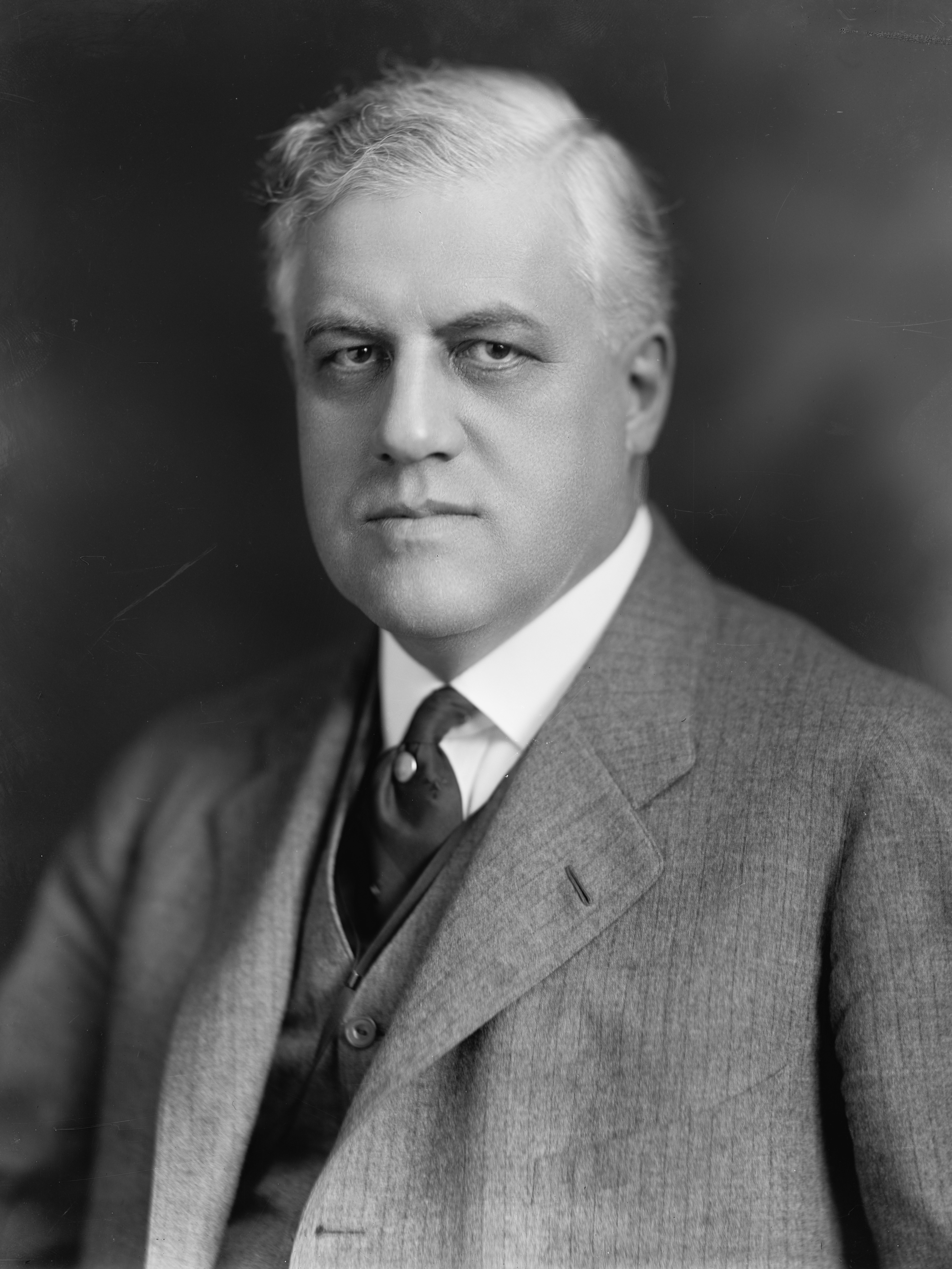
Nominee	Boies Penrose	Gifford Pinchot	A. Mitchell Palmer
Party	Republican	Progressive	Democratic
Popular vote	519,810	269,265	266,436
Percentage	46.76%	24.22%	23.97%
- County results Penrose: 20–30% 30–40% 40–50% 50–60% 60–70% Pinchot: 30–40% 40–50% Palmer: 30–40% 40–50% 50–60% 60–70%
Senator before election
Boies Penrose
Republican
Elected Senator
Boies Penrose
Republican

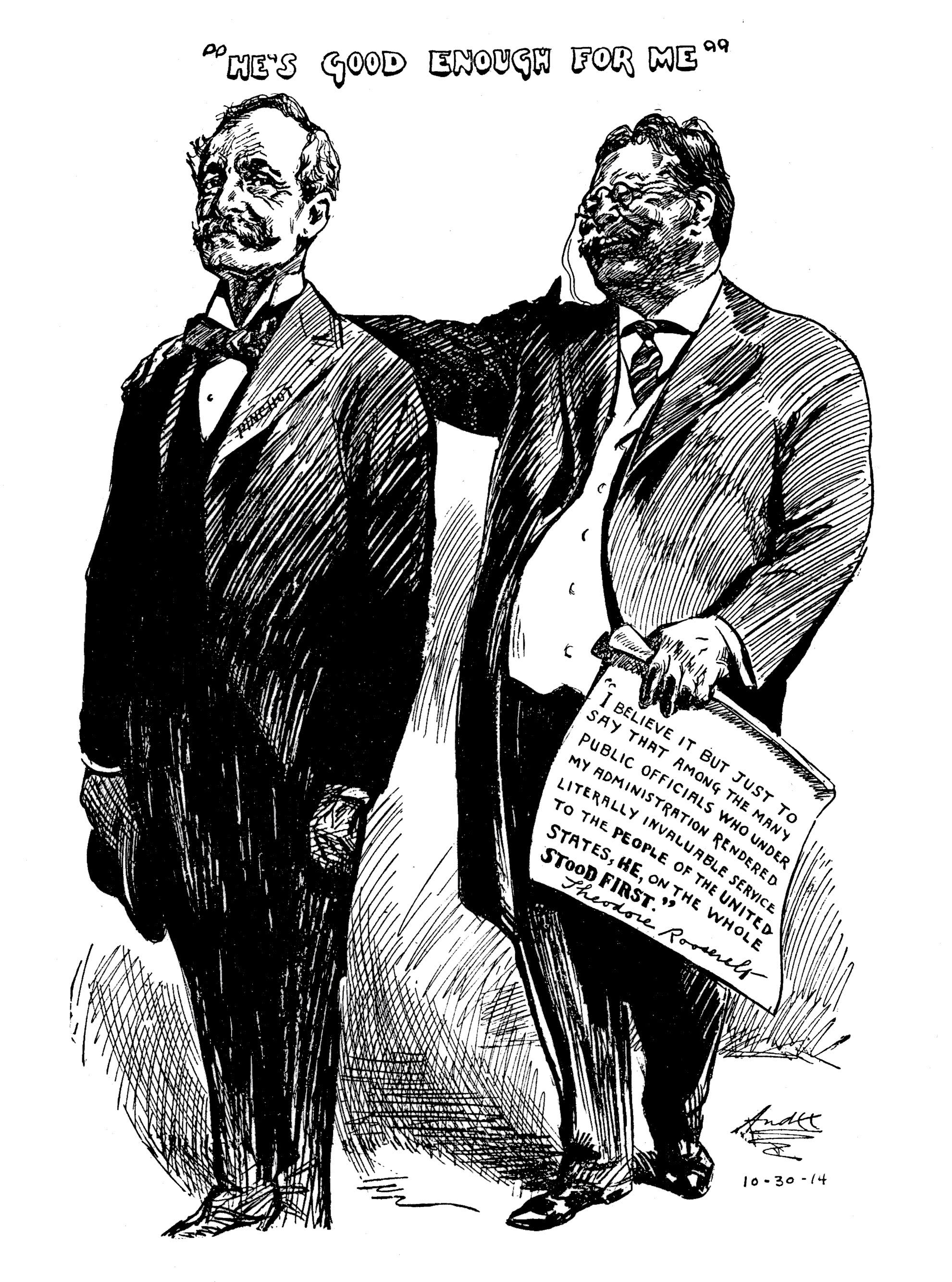
Theodore Roosevelt endorses Pinchot, running for U.S. Senate on Progressive ticket in Pennsylvania 1914.

The 1914 United States Senate election in Pennsylvania was held on November 3, 1914. Incumbent Republican U.S. Senator Boies Penrose won re-election against Gifford Pinchot and A. Mitchell Palmer.

This is the first Class III senate election in Pennsylvanian history in which all voters chose the Senate seats. Prior Senate seats were chosen by the Pennsylvania House of Representatives.

== General election ==
=== Candidates ===
- A. S. Landis (Industrialist)
- Madison F. Larkin (Prohibition)
- Alexander Mitchell Palmer, U.S. Representative from Stroudsburg (Democratic)
- Boies Penrose, incumbent Senator since 1897 (Republican)
- Gifford Pinchot, former Chief of the United States Forest Service (Progressive)
- Frederick W. Whiteside (Socialist)

=== Results ===
1914 U.S. Senate election in Pennsylvania
Party	Candidate	Votes	%
Republican	Boies Penrose (incumbent)	519,810	46.76%
Progressive	Gifford Pinchot	269,265	24.22%
Democratic	A. Mitchell Palmer	266,436	23.87%
Socialist	Frederick W. Whiteside	37,950	3.41%
Prohibition	Madison F. Larkin	17,585	1.58%
Industrialist	A. S. Landis	680	0.06%
Total votes		1,111,726	100.00%
