= Moosehead, Pennsylvania =

Unincorporated community in Pennsylvania, US

- Unincorporated community
- Location within Pennsylvania Location within the United States
- Coordinates: 41°07′11″N 75°47′36″W
- Country: United States
- State: Pennsylvania
- County: Luzerne
- Township: Dennison
- Elevation: 1,460 ft (450 m)
- Time zone: UTC-5 (Eastern (EST))
  - Summer (DST): UTC-4 (EDT)
- Area codes: 570 & 272
- GNIS feature ID: 1204207

Moosehead is an unincorporated community in Dennison Township, Luzerne County, Pennsylvania, United States.

== Notable person ==
A. Mitchell Palmer (1872-1936), lawyer and United States Attorney General, was born in Moosehead.
