= 1911 United States Senate election in Massachusetts =

- January 18, 1911

280 members of the Massachusetts General Court 141 votes needed to win
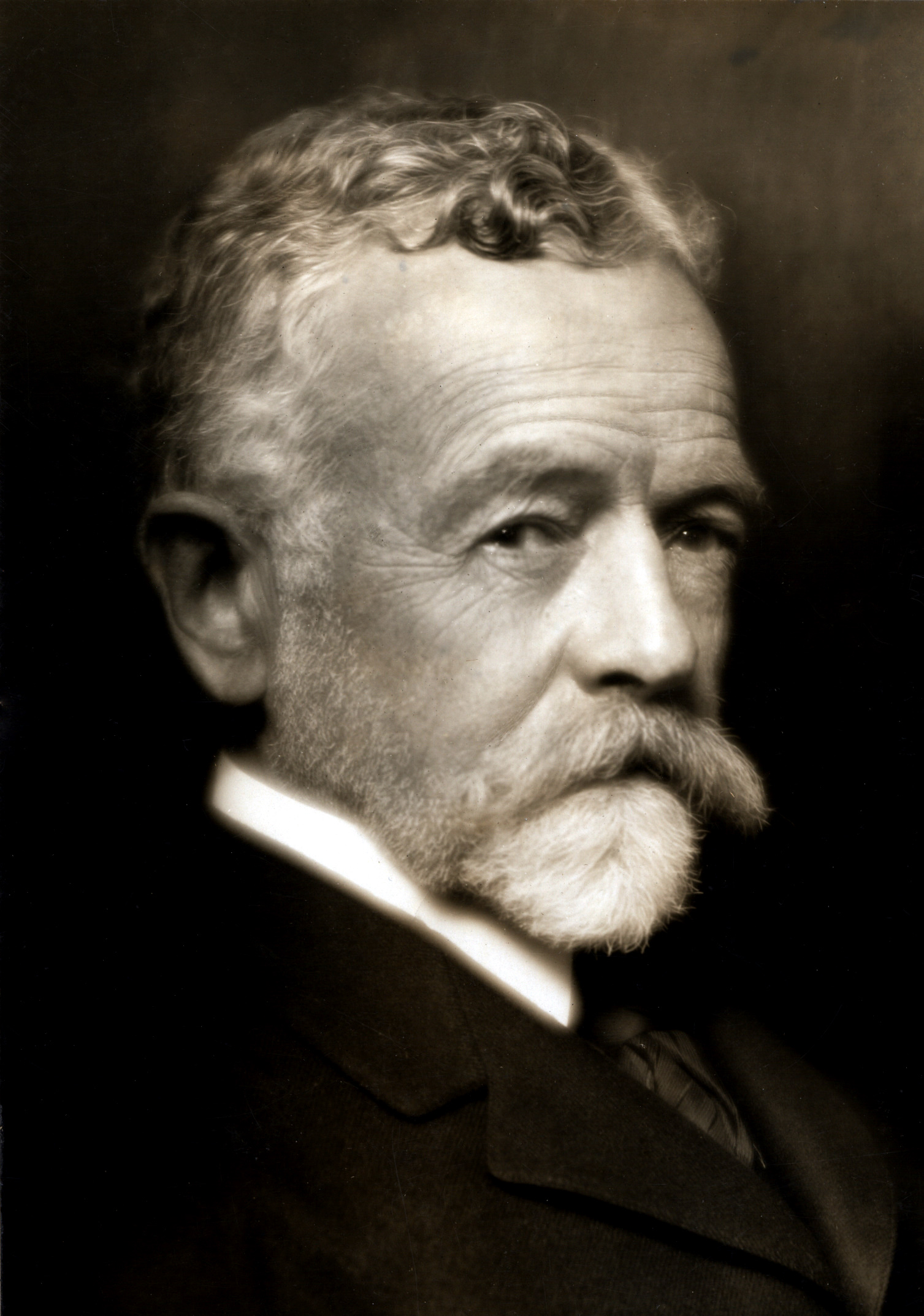

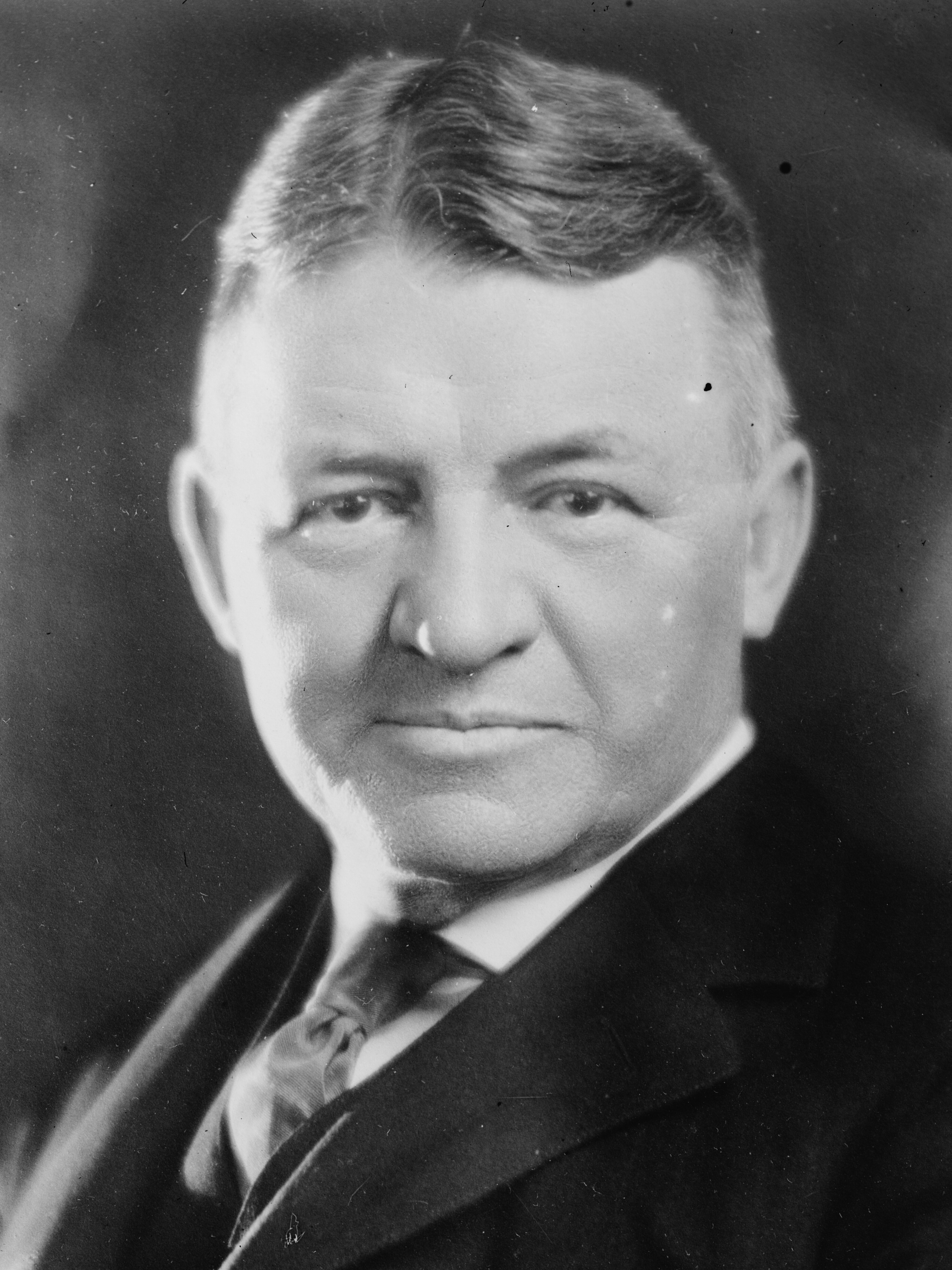
| Nominee | Henry Cabot Lodge | Sherman L. Whipple |
| Party | Republican | Democratic |
| Electoral vote | 146 | 121 |
| Percentage | 52.33% | 43.37% |
Senator before election
Henry Cabot Lodge
Republican
Elected Senator
Henry Cabot Lodge
Republican

The 1911 United States Senate election in Massachusetts was held on January 17–18, 1911. Republican incumbent Henry Cabot Lodge was narrowly re-elected to a fourth term in office against intense opposition within his own party, led by U.S. representative Butler Ames and Massachusetts governor-elect Eugene Foss. Lodge was re-elected on a joint ballot with only five votes more than the necessary minimum for a majority.

At the time, Massachusetts elected United States senators by a majority vote of the combined houses of the Massachusetts General Court.

== Background ==
In 1910, the Republican Party became deeply divided between its progressive and conservative wings over issues including the Payne–Aldrich Tariff Act and Pinchot–Ballinger controversy. Progressives generally supported tariff reform and opposed corporate influence over American politics. Many progressives sought to draft former president Theodore Roosevelt to challenge his successor, incumbent president William Howard Taft. Lodge, who was a personal friend to Roosevelt but strongly favored protectionism, remained neutral in the growing conflict through 1910.

Massachusetts senator Henry Cabot Lodge, a long time leader of the Massachusetts Republican Party, was opposed by many progressives over his support for protectionism, alleged connections to big business, and his opposition to direct election of senators. On June 26, 1910, progressive U.S. representative Butler Ames declared he would oppose Lodge for re-election. Ames launched his campaign ahead of the fall elections for the Massachusetts General Court, seeking to campaign on behalf of progressive candidates to the legislature and secure an anti-Lodge majority.

On November 8, 1910, the state elections resulted in major gains for the Democratic Party, including the election of Eugene Foss, the first Democratic governor of Massachusetts since 1904 and only the second in twenty years. Although Republicans retained a majority in both houses of the Massachusetts General Court, they retained an overall majority of only 13 seats, meaning that only a small percentage of Republicans would have to defect to swing the election.

1911 Massachusetts legislature
| Party | Senate | House | Total |
|---|---|---|---|
| Republican | 25 | 128 | 153 |
| Democratic | 15 | 111 | 126 |
| Socialist | 0 | 1 | 1 |
| Total | 40 | 240 | 280 |
| Required for majority | 21 | 121 | 141 |

== Campaign ==
Immediately after the legislative elections, Lodge was on shaky ground. The narrowed Republican majority suggested that he could only survive the defection of up to twelve Republican legislators in the upcoming session; one more would deadlock the legislature and require multiple rounds of balloting, in which case Lodge would likely be forced to withdraw in favor of a compromise candidate.

Early indications showed that Lodge had a slim likelihood of winning a fourth term. A canvass of the legislators-elect by the Boston Globe on November 10 indicated that twelve Republicans already opposed Lodge, with 90 uncommitted or not responding. On November 23, another canvass showed fourteen against Lodge, more than enough to block his re-election, with 64 more still declining to commit to supporting him.

Governor-elect Eugene Foss, who asserted that his victory in November represented a popular repudiation of Lodge, set out on a statewide barnstorming tour in which he suggested that he should be personally allowed to choose Lodge's successor. According to historian Richard Abrams, the Foss campaign alienated moderate and conservative Democratic legislators and reinforced Republican unity, by discouraging Lodge opponents from appearing to be under Foss's thumb. On December 21, the leading opposition candidate, William A. Gaston, withdrew his name from consideration, and other well-known Democrats declined to be considered, including James H. Vahey, Charles Sumner Hamlin, and Henry Melville Whitney. In fact, Whitney later endorsed Lodge in January, arguing that he was better able to secure a reciprocal trade treaty than any other man.

On January 3, 1911, facing an active mutiny from within his party and needing to win back Republican legislators to keep his seat, Lodge delivered a multi-hour speech at Symphony Hall in Boston, forcefully defending his decades-long political career and service in Congress, as well as his positions on tariffs and Canadian reciprocity.

On January 14, Lodge's campaign received a major boost when Roosevelt personally intervened on his behalf. Roosevelt sent a public telegram to Massachusetts House speaker Joseph Walker, a leading progressive, to urge vigorous support for Lodge. Roosevelt also denied charges by Ames that Lodge had sought, during Roosevelt's presidency, to improperly broker the sale of colliers to the United States Navy through Paul Morton. Roosevelt specifically denied that conversations alleged by Ames had taken place and charged Ames with misrepresenting the facts. Although Ames fired back a firm critique the next day, Roosevelt's public defense of Lodge immediately weakened progressive unity against him. On the same day as Ames's response to Roosevelt, Walker declined to be nominated as a candidate against Lodge, citing a commitment he had made to support the senator in early July. The Roosevelt endorsement provided crucial cover for moderate state legislators to vote for Lodge without abandoning the growing progressive movement.

=== Polling ===
| Poll source | Date(s) | Sample Size | For Lodge | Against Lodge | Uncommitted | Did not respond |
|---|---|---|---|---|---|---|
| The Boston Daily Globe | November 10, 1910 | Republican legislators-elect | 51 | 12 | 50 | 40 |
| The Boston Daily Globe | November 23, 1910 | Republican legislators-elect | 62 | 14 | 64 | 13 |

== Nominations ==
=== Republican ===
On January 16, the Republican Party held an official, mandatory internal nominating caucus, which served as a final party canvas ahead of the balloting. The caucus registered 125 votes in favor of Lodge, indicating that he was still sixteen short of the majority, but it also provided Lodge the formal nomination of the party, meaning that dissenters would have to break party lines to vote against him. Although eight legislators were missing from the caucus, counting their totals would have left Lodge still eight short of a majority.

Some observers suggested that Lodge would need to circumvent the progressive Republicans by seeking Democratic support for his re-election.

=== Democratic ===
The Democratic caucus was also held on January 16, and the Democratic legislators selected Brookline attorney and perennial candidate Sherman L. Whipple as their nominee. Whipple was a known ally of Foss.

== Balloting ==
=== Separate ballots ===
On January 17, the Senate and the House of Representatives met to take separate ballots. In the Senate, Lodge won a majority with 24 votes out of 40. However, he received only 117 out of 240 votes in the House of Representatives. As a result, a joint ballot was scheduled for the next day; between the two chambers combined, the initial vote indicated a majority of only one vote for Lodge.

1911 U.S. Senate election in Massachusetts (Senate ballot)
| Party | Candidate | Votes | % |
|---|---|---|---|
| Republican | Henry Cabot Lodge (incumbent) | 24 | 60.00% |
| Democratic | Sherman L. Whipple | 14 | 35.00% |
| Republican | Butler Ames | 2 | 5.00% |
| Total votes | | 40 | 100.00% |

1911 U.S. Senate election in Massachusetts
| Party | Candidate | Votes | % |
|---|---|---|---|
| Republican | Henry Cabot Lodge (incumbent) | 117 | 48.75% |
| Democratic | Sherman L. Whipple | 109 | 45.42% |
| Republican | Butler Ames | 6 | 2.50% |
| Republican | Curtis Guild Jr. | 1 | 0.42% |
| Republican | Joseph Walker | 4 | 1.67% |
| Socialist | Sylvester McBride | 1 | 0.42% |
| Democratic | John R. Thayer | 1 | 0.36% |
| None | No vote | 1 | 0.36% |
| Total votes | | 280 | 100.00% |

=== Joint ballot ===
In the joint ballot before the entire combined General Court, two Democratic state senators (Martin P. F. Curley and Michael J. Murray, both Irish Catholics from Boston) crossed party lines to vote for Lodge. Simultaneously, a handful of progressive holdouts abandoned the Ames ticket to avoid a protracted stalemate.

1911 United States Senate election in Massachusetts
| Party | Candidate | Votes | % |
|---|---|---|---|
| Republican | Henry Cabot Lodge (incumbent) | 146 | 52.33% |
| Democratic | Sherman L. Whipple | 121 | 43.37% |
| Republican | Butler Ames | 7 | 2.51% |
| Republican | Abbott Lawrence Lowell | 2 | 0.72% |
| Republican | Curtis Guild Jr. | 1 | 0.36% |
| Socialist | Sylvester McBride | 1 | 0.36% |
| Democratic | John R. Thayer | 1 | 0.36% |
| None | No vote | 1 | 0.36% |
| Total votes | | 280 | 100.00% |

== Aftermath ==
Local press heavily implied that Curley and Murray received influence over patronage or judicial appointments from Lodge in exchange for their political support. While this connection was never proven, public outrage against deadlocks and sudden floor defections in this and other Senate elections led to passage of the Seventeenth Amendment to the United States Constitution, requiring the direct election of all U.S. senators, in 1913.

Lodge served three more terms in the Senate, winning closely fought elections against John F. Fitzgerald in 1916 and William A. Gaston in 1922 and serving until his death in 1924. He continued to serve as a leading figure in the national Republican Party, chairing the Senate Committee on Foreign Relations and leading the American opposition to the Treaty of Versailles. Although Theodore Roosevelt had provided crucial support to his 1911 re-election bid, Lodge ultimately remained neutral in Roosevelt's campaign for a return to the presidency against William Howard Taft in 1912. Although Roosevelt took the decision as a personal betrayal, the two men later reconciled and remained friends until Roosevelt's death in 1919.
