= 1913 United States Senate election in Massachusetts =

- January 14, 1913
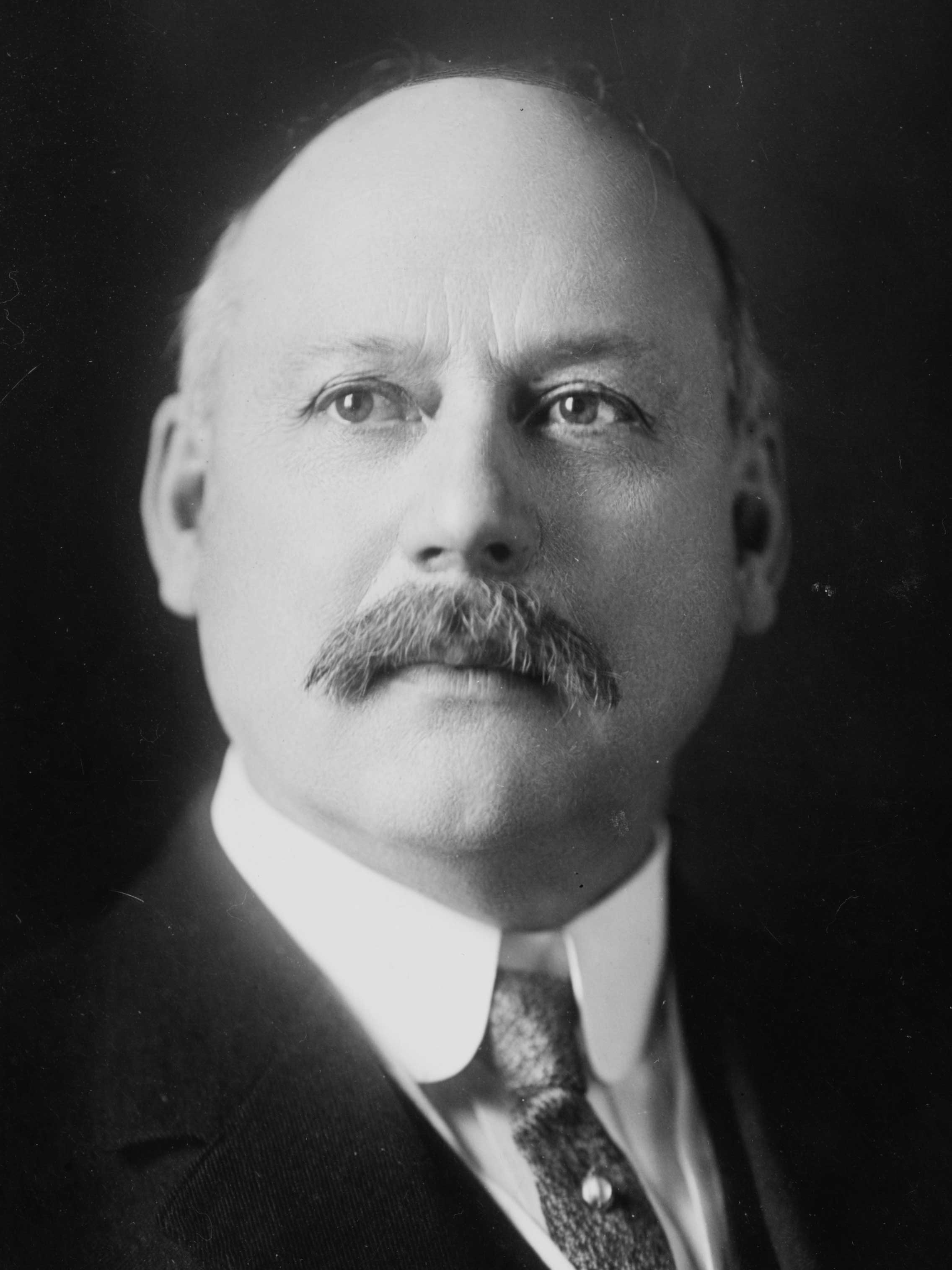

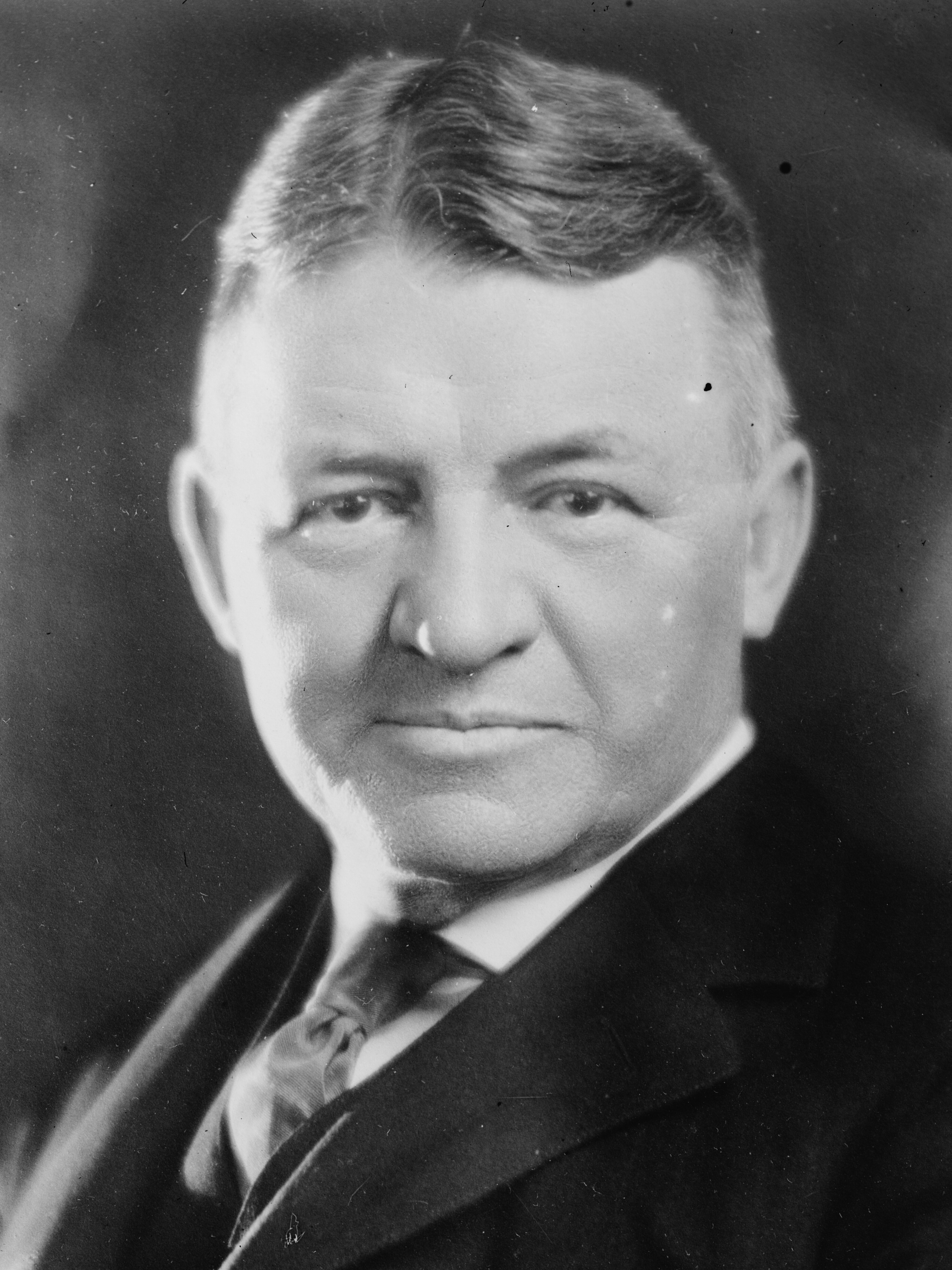
Nominee	John W. Weeks	Sherman L. Whipple
Party	Republican	Democratic
Members' vote	160 (Note: 26 Senate votes, 134 House votes)	80 (Note: 11 Senate votes, 69 House votes)
Percentage	58.82%	29.41%
U.S. senator before election
Winthrop M. Crane
Republican
Elected U.S. Senator
John W. Weeks
Republican

The 1913 United States Senate election in Massachusetts was held during January 1913. Incumbent Republican Senator Winthrop Crane retired and was succeeded by Republican John Wingate Weeks.

At the time, Massachusetts elected United States senators by a majority vote of the combined houses of the Massachusetts General Court.

== Republican caucus ==
=== Candidates ===
- Eben Sumner Draper, former governor of Massachusetts
- Curtis Guild Jr., U.S. Ambassador to Russia and former governor of Massachusetts
- George P. Lawrence, U.S. Representative from North Adams
- Robert Luce, Lieutenant Governor of Massachusetts
- Samuel Walker McCall, U.S. Representative from Winchester
- John Wingate Weeks, U.S. Representative and former mayor of Newton

=== Results ===
1913 Republican nominating caucus
Party	Candidate	Votes	%
Republican	John W. Weeks	97	60.25%
Republican	Samuel Walker McCall	57	35.40%
Republican	Curtis Guild Jr.	5	3.11%
Republican	George P. Lawrence	1	0.62%
Republican	Robert Luce	1	0.62%
Total votes		161	100.00%

After winning the caucus nomination on the thirty-first ballot, Weeks's support was made unanimous by acclamation on a motion by McCall supporter Claude L. Allen. The motion was seconded by Guild supporter John L. Sherburne.

== General election ==
Massachusetts legislative vote (in Massachusetts Senate)
Party	Candidate	Votes	%
Republican	John W. Weeks	26	66.67%
Democratic	Sherman L. Whipple	11	28.21%
Democratic	John A. Keliher	1	2.56%
Democratic	Joseph C. Pelletier	1	2.56%

Massachusetts legislative vote (in Massachusetts House of Representatives)
Party	Candidate	Votes	%
Republican	John W. Weeks	134	57.51%
Democratic	Sherman L. Whipple	69	29.61%
Progressive	John Graham Brooks	5	2.15%
Democratic	John F. Meaney	3	1.29%
Democratic	James B. Carroll	3	1.29%
Democratic	Charles A. DeCourey	3	1.29%
Democratic	Charles Sumner Hamlin	2	0.86%
Democratic	John A. Thayer	2	0.86%
Democratic	John F. Fitzgerald	2	0.86%
Republican	Curtis Guild Jr.	1	0.43%
Republican	Robert Luce	1	0.43%
Democratic	Philip J. O'Connell	1	0.43%
Democratic	Richard Olney II	1	0.43%
Democratic	Joseph Henry O'Neil	1	0.43%
Democratic	Andrew J. Peters	1	0.43%
Democratic	Harvey H. Pratt	1	0.43%
Socialist	Roland D. Sawyer	1	0.43%
Democratic	John P. Sweeney	1	0.43%
Democratic	George Fred Williams	1	0.43%
