= Thomas Watt Gregory =

American politician and 49th Attorney General (1861–1933)

Thomas Gregory
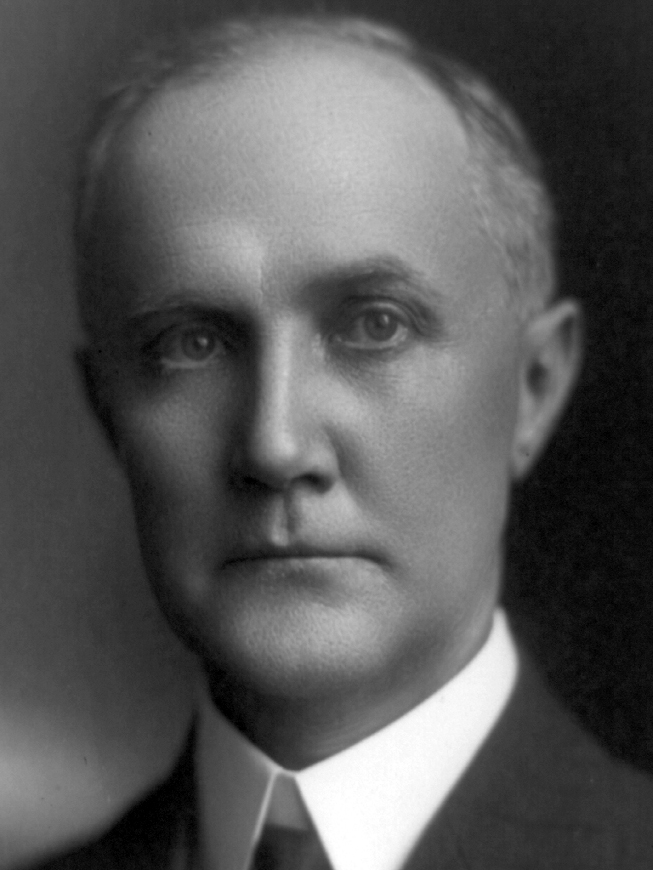
- Gregory in 1913

49th United States Attorney General
- In office August 29, 1914 – March 4, 1919
- President: Woodrow Wilson
- Preceded by: James C. McReynolds
- Succeeded by: Mitchell Palmer

Personal details
- Born: Thomas Watt Gregory; November 6, 1861 Crawfordsville, Mississippi, C.S.
- Died: February 26, 1933 (aged 71) New York City, U.S.
- Party: Democratic
- Education: Rhodes College (BA); University of Virginia, Charlottesville; University of Texas, Austin (LLB)

Thomas Watt Gregory (November 6, 1861 – February 26, 1933) was an American politician and lawyer. He was a progressive and attorney who served as US Attorney General from 1914 to 1919 under US president Woodrow Wilson.

== Early life ==
Gregory was born in Crawfordsville, Mississippi, the son of a Confederate doctor. He graduated from the Webb School (Bell Buckle, Tennessee) in 1881 and Southwestern Presbyterian University, today known as Rhodes College, in 1883, and was a special student at the University of Virginia. Gregory entered the University of Texas at Austin in 1884 and graduated a year later with a degree in law.

He began the practice of law in Austin in 1885 and served as a regent of the University of Texas for eight years. Gregory Gymnasium was named in honor of his efforts to provide an adequate exercise facility for the students and faculty of the university. He declined appointment as assistant attorney general of Texas in 1892 and an appointment to the state bench in 1896, but he "gained experience as a trust prosecutor as a special counsel for the state of Texas."

He embraced the progressive rhetoric of the early 20th century by his condemnations of "plutocratic power," "predatory wealth," and "the greed of the party spoilsmen" and participated in Edward M. House's Democratic coalition.

Gregory was a delegate to the Democratic National Convention at St. Louis and at state delegate at-large at the Baltimore convention. He was appointed Special Assistant to the US attorney general in 1913 in the investigation and proceedings against the New York, New Haven and Hartford Railroad Company.

== Attorney General ==
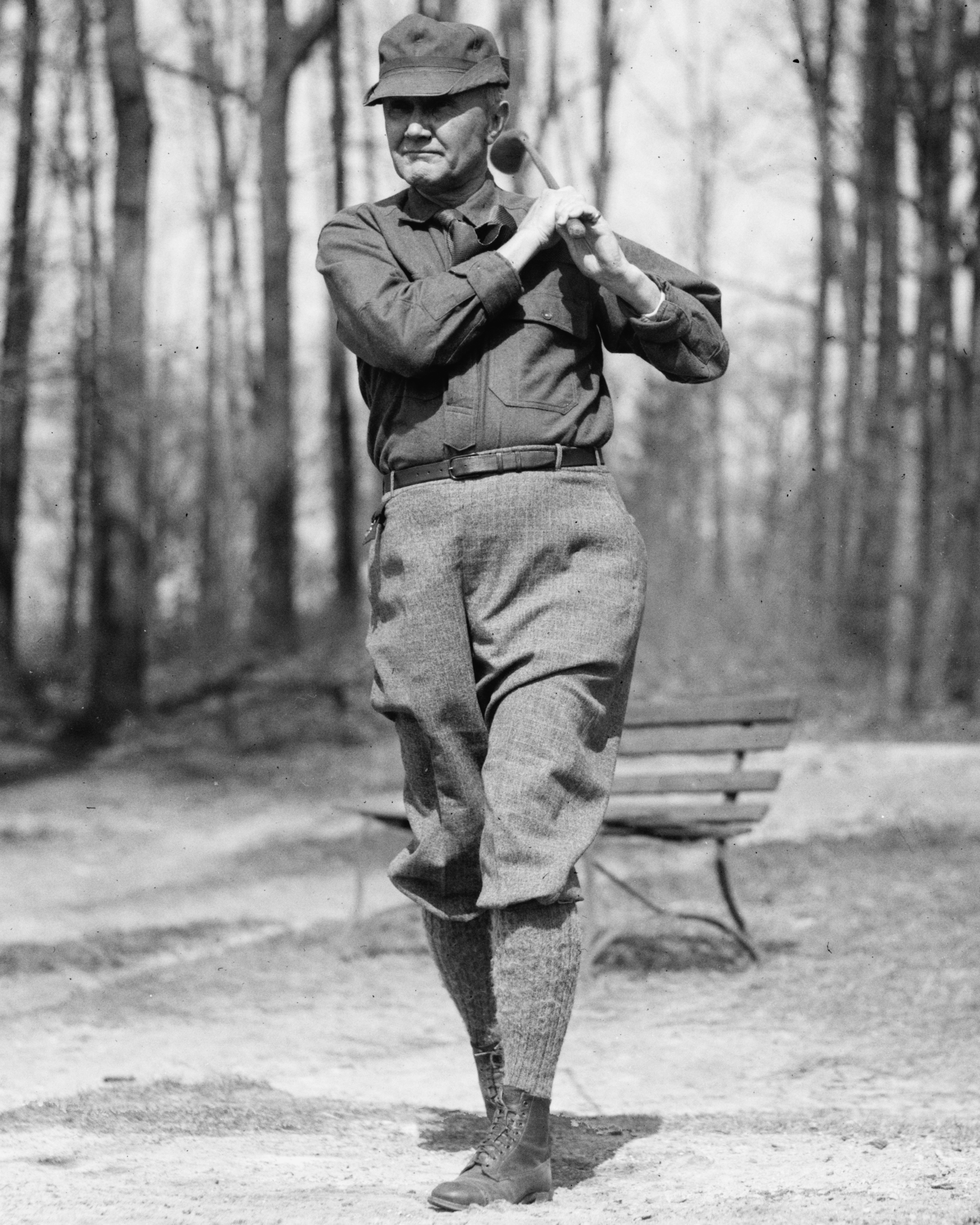
Gregory golfing in 1920

In 1914, US President Woodrow Wilson appointed him US Attorney General, an office that Gregory held until 1919. Despite a continuing commitment to progressive reform, Gregory provoked enormous controversy performance as attorney general because of his collaboration with Postmaster General Albert S. Burleson and others in orchestrating a campaign to crush domestic dissent during World War I.

Gregory helped frame the Espionage and Sedition Acts, which compromised the constitutional guarantees of freedom of speech and press, and he lobbied for their passage. He encouraged extralegal surveillance by the American Protective League and directed the federal prosecutions of more than 2000 opponents of the war: "By 1918 the Attorney General was able to declare, 'It is safe to say that never in its history has this country been so thoroughly policed.'"

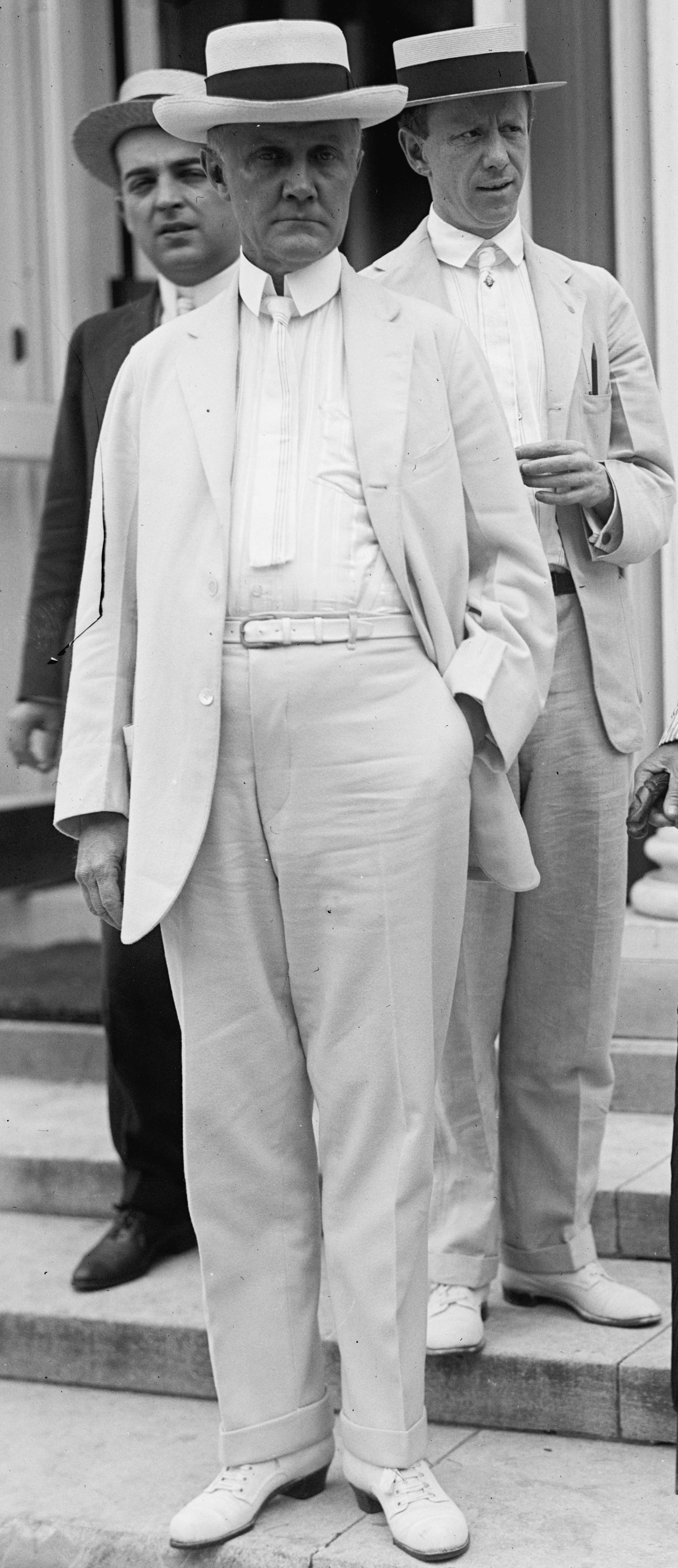
Thomas Watt Gregory (front) in 1920

In 1916, Wilson wanted to appoint Gregory to the US Supreme Court, but Gregory declined the offer because of his impaired hearing, his eagerness to participate in Wilson's re-election campaign, and his belief that he lacked the necessary temperament to be a judge. He was a member of Wilson's Second Industrial Conference in 1919 and 1920.

== Death and legacy ==
During a trip to New York to confer with Franklin Roosevelt, Gregory contracted pneumonia and died. He is buried in Austin.

His portrait was painted in 1917 by the Swiss-born American artist Adolfo Müller-Ury (1862–1947) and hangs in the Department of Justice in Washington, DC.

Legal offices
Preceded by James C. McReynolds	United States Attorney General; 1914–1919	Succeeded by A. Mitchell Palmer
