= General Hughes =

General Hughes may refer to:

- Augusto Hughes (1931–1993), brigadier general in the Argentine Air Force
- Everett Hughes (general) (1885–1957), major general in the United States Army
- Frederic Hughes (1858–1944), Australian Army general in the First World War
- Garnet Hughes (1880–1937), major-general in the Canadian army during the First World War
- Harley Hughes (1935–2022) lieutenant general in the United States Air Force
- Ivor Hughes (1897–1962), major general in the British Army during the Second World War
- James D. Hughes (1922–2024), lieutenant general in the United States Air Force
- John H. Hughes (general) (1876–1953), major general in the United States Army
- John T. Hughes (Confederate officer) (1817–1862), colonel in the Confederate Army in the American Civil War known as "General Hughes"; possibly promoted to brigadier general without documentation
- Patrick M. Hughes (born 1942), lieutenant general in the United States Army
- Robert Patterson Hughes (1839–1909), major general in the United States Army
- Ronald Laurence Hughes (1920–2003), major general in the Australian Army during the Korean War
- Sam Hughes (1853–1921), major-general in the Canadian militia, by self-promotion while serving as defence minister

== See also ==
- Attorney General Hughes (disambiguation)
