= United States Senate Committee on the Mississippi River and Its Tributaries =

The United States Senate Committee on the Mississippi River and Its Tributaries was established in 1879 to replace the Select Committee on the Levee System of the Mississippi River (1870–1879) and oversaw the activities of the United States Army Corps of Engineers and the Mississippi River Commission. The committee was abolished in 1921.

The committee was at various times called the Committee on the Mississippi River and Its Tributaries, the Committee on Levees and Improvements of the Mississippi River, and the Committee on the Improvement of the Mississippi River and Its Tributaries.

== Chairmen ==
- 1881–1883: Charles Henry Van Wyck (R-Nebraska)
- 1895–1909: Knute Nelson (R-Minnesota)
- 1911–1913: Robert Latham Owen (D-Oklahoma)
- 1913–1919: Albert Baird Cummins (R-Iowa)
