= Attorney General Hughes =

Attorney General Hughes may refer to:

- Billy Hughes (1862–1952), Attorney-General of Australia
- Francis Wade Hughes (1817–1885), Attorney General of Pennsylvania
- L. C. Hughes (1842–1915), Arizona Territory Attorney General
- Simon Pollard Hughes Jr. (1830–1906), Arkansas Attorney General
- Tom Hughes (Australian politician) (born 1923), Attorney-General of Australia

== See also ==
- Hughes (surname)
- General Hughes (disambiguation)
