= Elizabeth Fulton Hester =

American suffragette

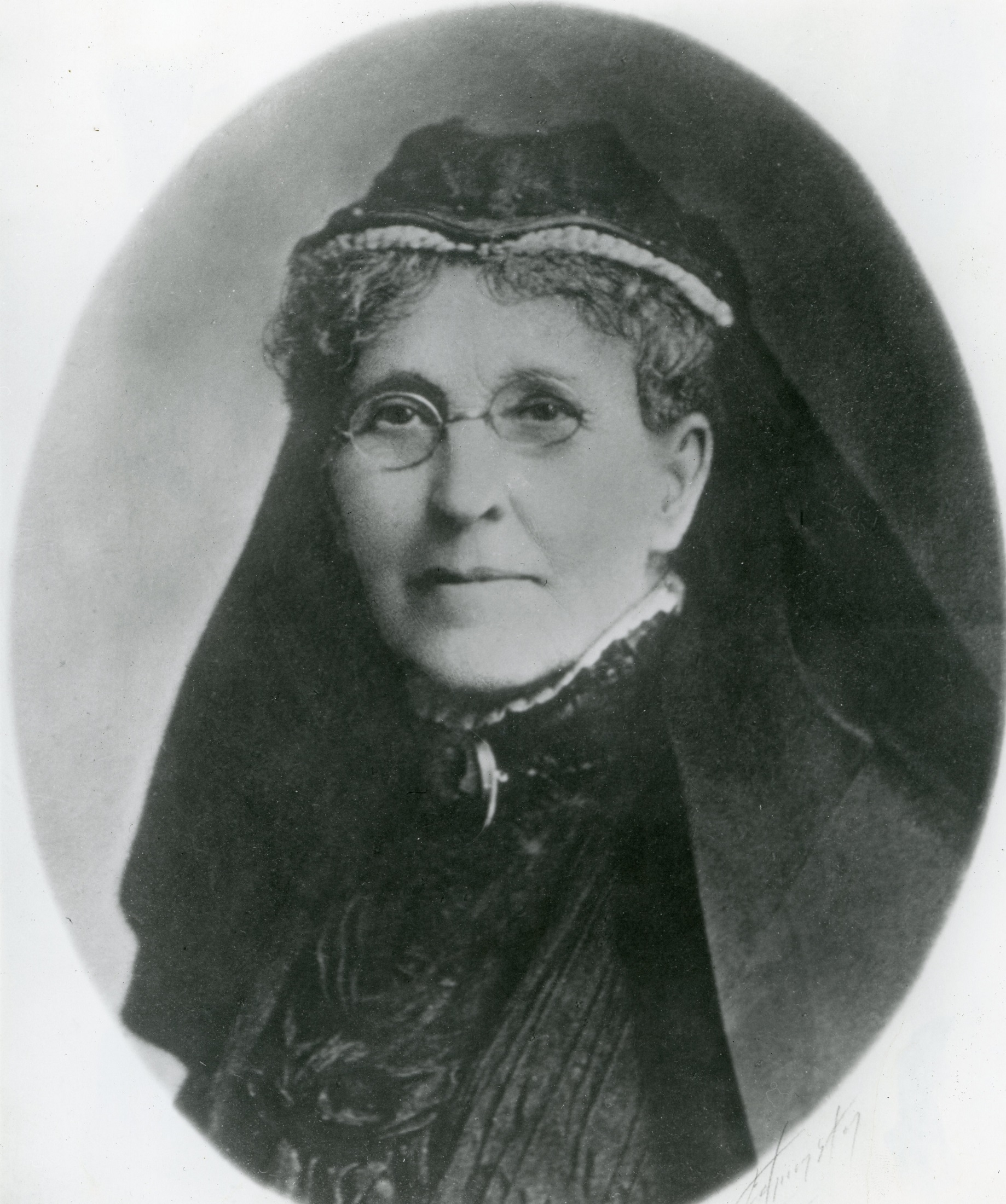
- Born: Elizabeth Fulton; January 6, 1839; Georgia
- Died: August 1929; Oklahoma
- Occupations: Missionary, teacher, nurse
- Known for: Missionary and education work

Elizabeth Fulton Hester was an American missionary, Confederate States of America nurse, and early advocate for women's suffrage who was active in Indian Territory and later the U.S. state of Oklahoma.

== Early life ==
Elizabeth Fulton Hester was born in Georgia on January 6, 1839, to Reverend Defau Tallerand Fulton and his wife. Defau Fulton had left Virginia to become a Methodist missionary to the Cherokee in North Georgia. She graduated from the Southern Masonic Female Seminary in Covington, Georgia in 1855.

== Missionary work and teaching ==
In 1856, she moved to Tishomingo, Chickasaw Nation, Indian Territory to work at a missionary school. In 1861, she moved with her husband, George Hester, to Boggy Depot, Choctaw Nation, Indian Territory. She taught at the national school organized by the Choctaw Nation. In 1878, she returned to Tishomingo helped form Indian Territory Woman's Foreign Missionary Society of the Methodist Episcopal Church, South. She advocated for women's suffrage. After her George's death in 1901, she moved to Muskogee, Oklahoma and founded the city's Muskogee Day Nursery. In 1917, she became the first woman to speak in the Oklahoma Capitol.

=== Civil War nursing ===
Hester worked as a nurse for the Confederate Army during the American Civil War in Boggy Depot, while her husband George was a captain. The Hester's mercantile store became a confederate hospital and top confederates, including Stand Watie, William B. Taliaferro, Samuel Cooper, Sterling Price, and Quantrill's Raiders dined at her home. She was later a chaplain for the United Daughters of the Confederacy of Oklahoma. After the war, George's store was looted by demoralized former Confederate soldiers and then seized by Union Army troops for serving as a Confederate hospital.

== Personal life and legacy ==
Hester married George B. Hester, a merchant, in 1859. Her daughter, Daisy Hester, married U.S. Senator Robert L. Owen. She was the first woman inducted into the Oklahoma Hall of Fame. She died in August 1929.
