= Adair, Oklahoma =

- Town
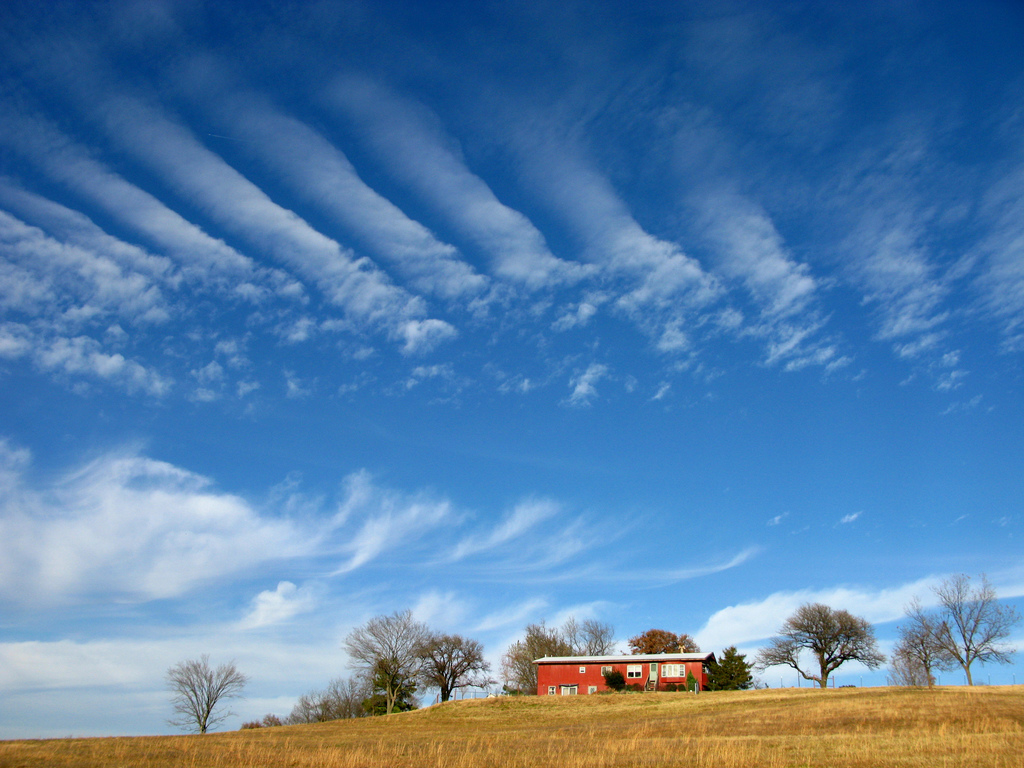
- A farm in Adair

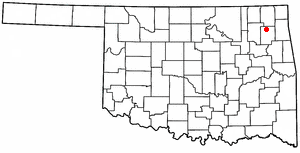
- Location in Oklahoma
- Coordinates: 36°26′13″N 95°16′25″W
- Country: United States
- State: Oklahoma
- County: Mayes

Area
  - Total: 4.92 sq mi (12.73 km^{2})
  - Land: 4.92 sq mi (12.73 km^{2})
  - Water: 0 sq mi (0.00 km^{2})
- Elevation: 679 ft (207 m)

Population (2020)
  - Total: 732
  - Density: 149/sq mi (57.5/km^{2})
- Time zone: UTC-6 (Central (CST))
  - Summer (DST): UTC-5 (CDT)
- ZIP Code: 74330
- Area codes: 539/918
- FIPS code: 40-00250
- GNIS feature ID: 2412333

Adair is a town in Mayes County, Oklahoma, United States. The population was 732 at the 2020 census, down from 790 in 2010. Named for two prominent Cherokee brothers, the town was established in 1883. It opened a Cherokee school in the 1880s.

== History ==
Adair is named after two Cherokee brothers, William Penn Adair, a politician and jurist, and Dr. Walter Thompson Adair. It was established on March 15, 1883, and incorporated in 1897. William Penn Adair lived in the area off and on for 17 years beginning in the late 1860s.

In the 1880s, a Cherokee school was started here. In 1907, shortly before statehood, the school began to admit white students.

=== Dalton Gang train robbery ===
In the most daring deed of the Dalton Gang up to that date, eight members held up the Missouri-Kansas-Texas train at Adair on July 14, 1892.

As the train neared, four men approached the night operator at the station and ordered him to "flag down" the train. As the train pulled to a stand-still, two members of the gang boarded the engine, while the others covered the conductor and train men. The station operator was taken to the express car, where he ordered the messenger inside to open up. When the messenger refused, the train's fireman was ordered to break open the door with his pick. Once inside, the bandits were quick to rifle the safe of its contents.

The gang did not know that a special detachment of eight railroad guards was on the train, in an effort to prevent such robberies. In command was J. J. Kinney, chief of railroad detectives, and Capt. J. H. LaFlore, chief of the Cherokee Nation police. Realizing the robbery was underway, the guards got off the train opposite the depot, and had a brief gun battle with some of the bandits on that side.

Finished on the train, the bandits made their get-away through the town. Doctors W. L. Goff and Youngblood were sitting on the porch of the drug store near the depot. Both men were hit several times by stray shots; Dr Goff was fatally wounded. Also wounded were captains Kinney and LaFlore, but they recovered.

The railroad and express company offered rewards of $5,000 "for the capture and conviction" for each bandit in the robbery.

== Geography ==
Adair is in northern Mayes County, 10 miles (16 km) north of Pryor on U.S. Route 69. The city is in the northeastern portion of the state known as "Green Country". US-69 leads north from Adair 17 miles (27 km) to Vinita. Oklahoma State Highway 28 crosses US-69 in the center of Adair, leading east 14 miles (23 km) to Langley and west the same distance to Foyil.

According to the U.S. Census Bureau, the town has a total area of 4.9 square miles (13 km^{2}), all land. The land in town drains southwest toward Pryor Creek, a south-flowing tributary of the Neosho River.

== Churches ==
Churches within the town boundaries include Adair United Methodist Church, First Baptist Church of Adair, and Adair Christian Church.

== Climate ==
Adair has more sunny days than the average U.S. city and a great deal less snowfall. Late spring is the wettest time of the year for the city, while winter is the driest.

Climate data for Adair
Month	Jan	Feb	Mar	Apr	May	Jun	Jul	Aug	Sep	Oct	Nov	Dec	Year
Mean daily maximum °F (°C)	47.0 (8.3)	52.5 (11.4)	61.0 (16.1)	71.8 (22.1)	79.1 (26.2)	87.0 (30.6)	93.0 (33.9)	93.3 (34.1)	85.0 (29.4)	74.9 (23.8)	60.4 (15.8)	50.4 (10.2)	71.3 (21.8)
Mean daily minimum °F (°C)	24.6 (−4.1)	28.9 (−1.7)	36.3 (2.4)	47.4 (8.6)	56.4 (13.6)	65.1 (18.4)	69.4 (20.8)	68.0 (20.0)	59.7 (15.4)	48.0 (8.9)	36.2 (2.3)	27.9 (−2.3)	47.3 (8.5)
Average precipitation inches (mm)	2.0 (51)	2.0 (51)	3.1 (79)	4.2 (110)	5.2 (130)	5.2 (130)	3.1 (79)	3.3 (84)	4.6 (120)	3.8 (97)	3.2 (81)	2.2 (56)	41.9 (1,068)
Source: Weatherbase

== Demographics ==
Historical population
Census	Pop.	Note	%±
1900	268		—
1910	376		40.3%
1920	369		−1.9%
1930	290		−21.4%
1940	407		40.3%
1950	299		−26.5%
1960	434		45.2%
1970	459		5.8%
1980	508		10.7%
1990	685		34.8%
2000	704		2.8%
2010	790		12.2%
2020	732		−7.3%
U.S. Decennial Census

=== 2020 census ===
As of the 2020 census, Adair had a population of 732. The median age was 36.0 years; 27.6% of residents were under 18 and 18.4% were 65 or older. For every 100 females, there were 100.0 males, and for every 100 females 18 and over, there were 94.9 males 18 and over.

None of the residents lived in urban areas, while 100.0% lived in rural areas.

Of the 268 households in Adair, 39.9% had children under 18 living in them, 52.2% were married-couple households, 19.0% were households with a male householder and no spouse or partner present, and 22.0% were households with a female householder and no spouse or partner present. About 20.1% of all households were made up of individuals, and 10.0% had someone living alone who was 65 or older.

The city had 298 housing units, of which 10.1% were vacant. The homeowner vacancy rate was 1.0% and the rental vacancy rate was 4.0%.

Racial composition as of the 2020 census
Race	Number	Percentage
White	478	65.3%
Black or African American	4	0.5%
American Indian and Alaska Native	118	16.1%
Asian	1	0.1%
Native Hawaiian and other Pacific Islander	1	0.1%
Some other race	10	1.4%
Two or more races	120	16.4%
Hispanic or Latino (of any race)	25	3.4%

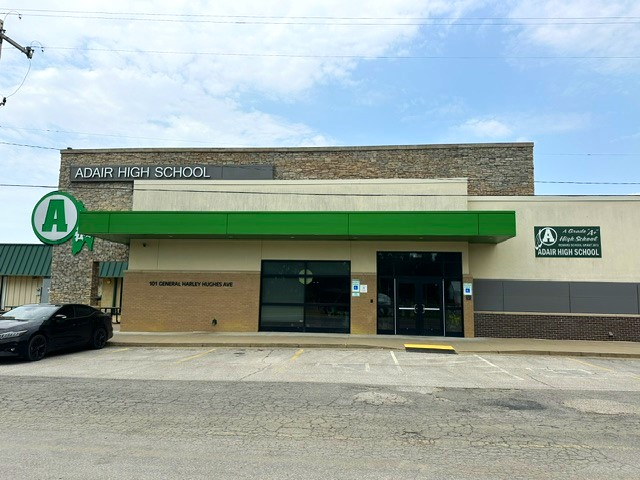
Adair High School in August of 2026

== Education ==
Adair is served by the Adair Independent School District.

=== 2010 census ===
As of the 2010 census, Adair had a population of 790. The population density was 180 people per square mile (68/km^{2}). The town's 315 housing units had an average density of 70 per square mile (27/km^{2}). The racial and ethnic composition of the population was 72.4% white, 0.1% black or African American, 18.9% Native American, 0.6% from some other race, and 8.0% from two or more races; 3.5% of the population was Hispanic or Latino.

Of the 272 households, 36.8% had children under 18 living with them, 57.7% were married couples living together, 12.1% had a female householder with no husband present, and 26.8% were not families. About 23.2% of all households were made up of individuals, and 8.5% had someone living alone who was 65 or older. The average household size was 2.59, and the average family size was 3.06.

In the town, the age distribution was 27.6% under 18, 10.8% from 18 to 24, 26.1% from 25 to 44, 23.4% from 45 to 64, and 12.1% who were 65 or older. The median age was 34 years. For every 100 females, there were 90.3 males. For every 100 females 18 and over, there were 91.7 males.

The median income in the town for a household was $35,250 and for a family was $38,500. Males had a median income of $31,313 versus $17,500 for females. The per capita income for the town was $14,388. About 10.5% of families and 12.3% of the population were below the poverty line, including 22.2% of those under 18 and 2.8% of those 65 or over.

== Notable people ==
- William Penn Adair, leader, politician and jurist of the Cherokee Nation; lived in the town for much of 17 years
- Harley Hughes, lieutenant general in the United States Air Force who served as deputy chief of staff, plans and operations, from 1985 to 1988
- Evelyn Varden (1893-1958), film and stage actress (The Bad Seed, The Night of the Hunter); born in Adair

== See also ==
- Samuel Houston Mayes
