= 1918 United States Senate election in Oklahoma =

- November 5, 1918
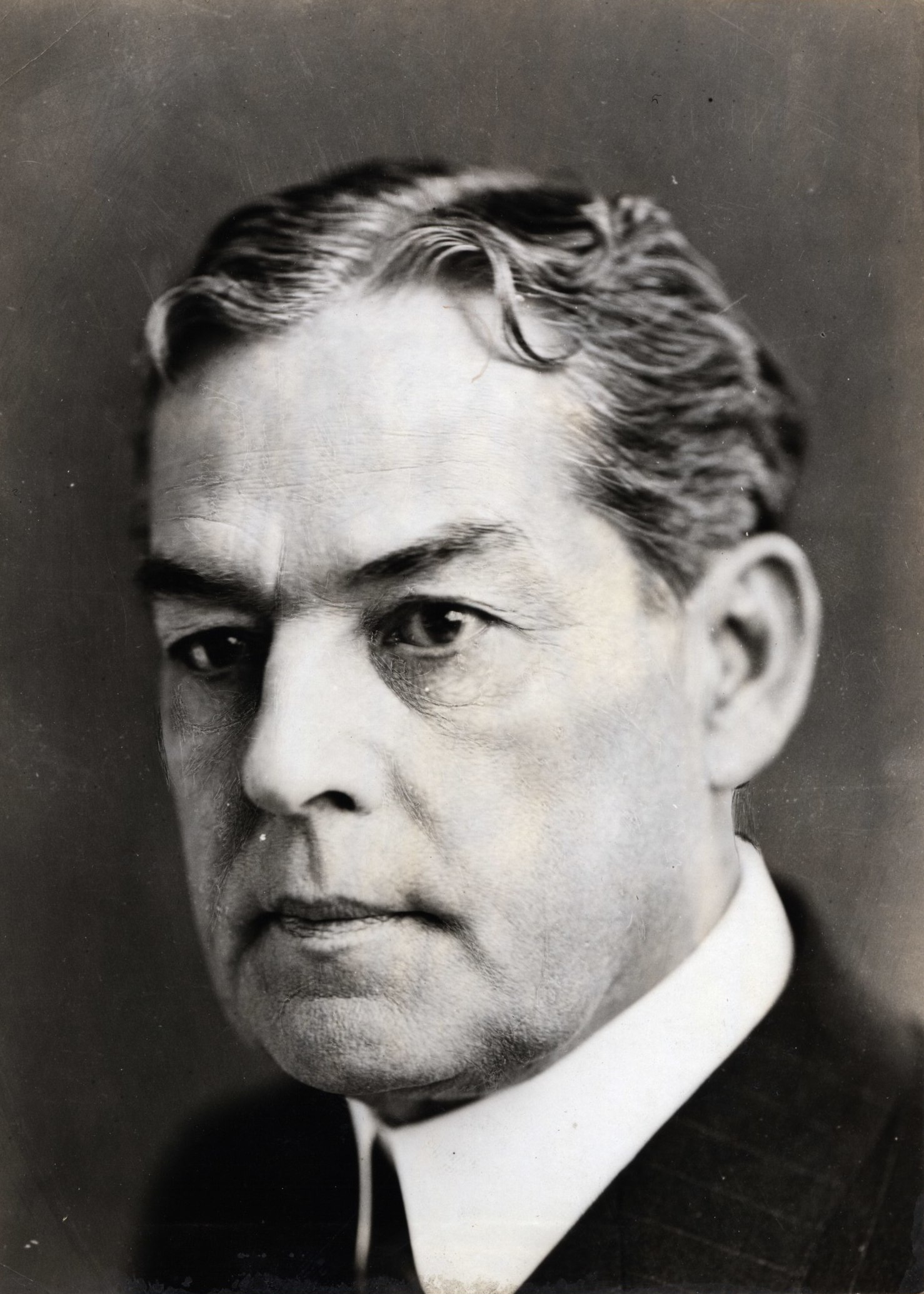

Nominee	Robert L. Owen	W. B. Johnson
Party	Democratic	Republican
Popular vote	105,009	77,043
Percentage	55.47%	40.69%
- County results Owen: 40–50% 50–60% 60–70% 70–80% 80–90% Johnson: 40–50% 50–60%
U.S. senator before election
Robert L. Owen
Democratic
Elected U.S. Senator
Robert L. Owen
Democratic

The 1918 United States Senate election in Oklahoma took place on November 5, 1918. Incumbent Senator Robert L. Owen, a Democrat, sought re-election in his first popular election. He won the Democratic primary in a landslide and faced former U.S. Attorney W. B. Johnson in the general election. Owen won re-election by a wide margin.

== Democratic primary ==
=== Candidates ===
- Robert L. Owen, incumbent U.S. Senator
- Robert Galbreath Jr., oilman

=== Results ===
Democratic primary
Party	Candidate	Votes	%
Democratic	Robert L. Owen (inc.)	71,356	75.50%
Democratic	Robert Galbreath Jr.	23,158	24.50%
Total votes		94,514	100.00%

== Republican primary ==
=== Candidates ===
- W. B. Johnson, former U.S. Attorney

=== Results ===
Republican primary
Party	Candidate	Votes	%
Republican	W. B. Johnson	35,490	100.00%
Total votes		35,490	100.00%

== Socialist Primary ==
=== Candidates ===
- C. M. Greenland

=== Results ===
Socialist primary
Party	Candidate	Votes	%
Socialist	C. M. Greenland	5,554	100.00%
Total votes		5,554	100.00%

== General election ==
=== Results ===
1918 United States Senate election in Oklahoma
Party	Candidate	Votes	%
Democratic	Robert L. Owen (inc.)	105,009	55.47%
Republican	W. B. Johnson	77,043	40.69%
Socialist	C. M. Greenland	7,272	3.84%
Majority		27,966	14.77%
Total votes		189,324	100.00%
Democratic hold			
