= Harley Hughes =

United States Air Force general

Harley A. Hughes
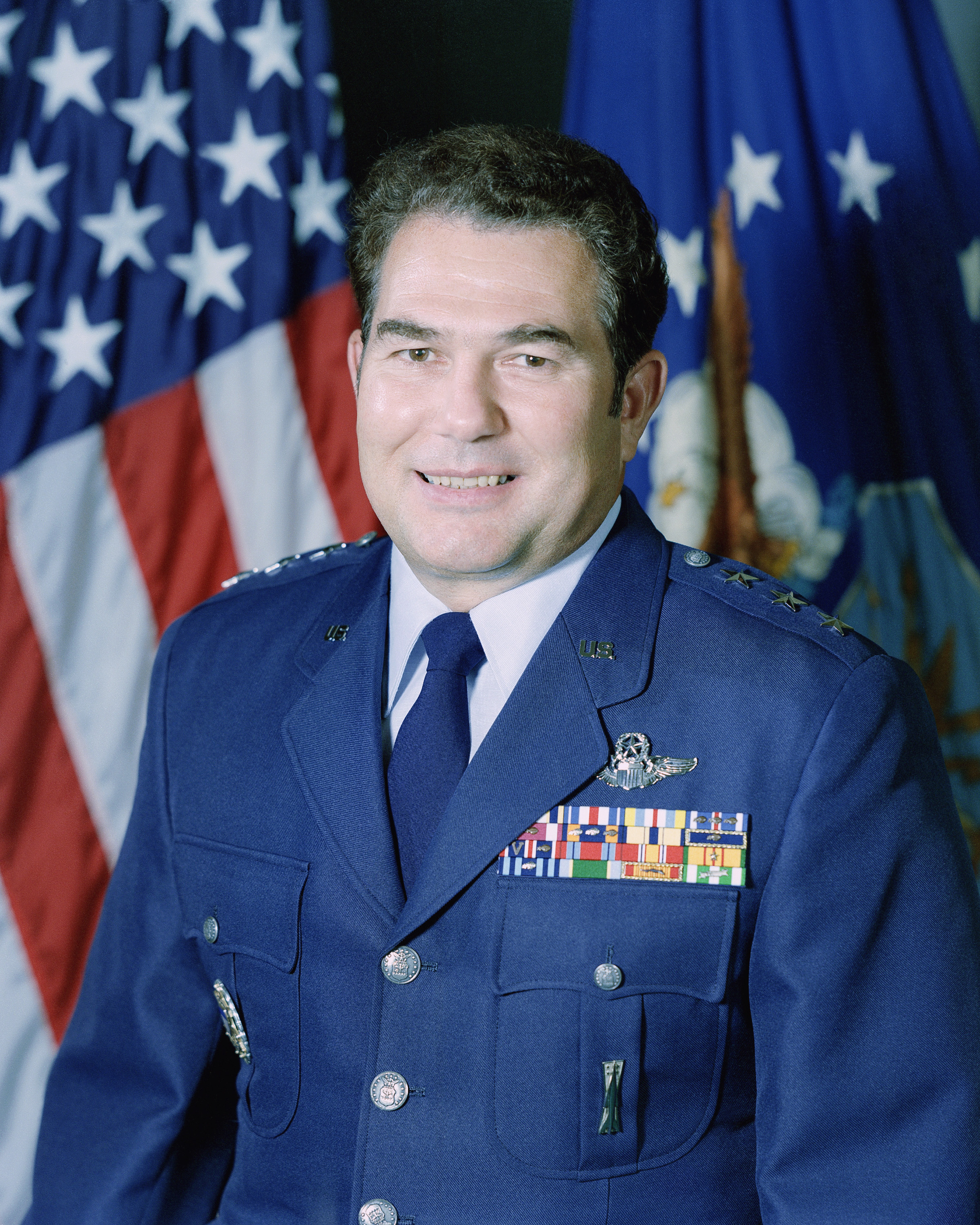
- Born: 5 October 1935; Adair, Oklahoma U.S.
- Died: 30 September 2022 (aged 86); Warrenton, Virginia, U.S.
- Burial place: Arlington National Cemetery
- Military career
- Allegiance: United States
- Branch: United States Air Force
- Service years: 1957–1988
- Rank: Lieutenant General
- Nickname: Oklahoma Wildman
- Conflicts: Vietnam
- Awards: Air Force Distinguished Service Medal, Silver Star, Defense Superior Service Medal, Distinguished Flying Cross with three oak leaf clusters, Meritorious Service Medal with oak leaf cluster, Air Medal with 11 oak leaf clusters, Air Force Commendation Medal with three oak leaf clusters, Presidential Unit Citation, Air Force Outstanding Unit Award with "V" device and oak leaf cluster, Combat Readiness Medal, National Defense Service Medal, Vietnam Service Medal with five oak leaf clusters, Air Force Longevity Service Award Ribbon with five oak leaf clusters, Small Arms Expert Marksmanship Ribbon, Republic of Vietnam Gallantry Cross with Palm and the Republic of Vietnam Campaign Medal.

Harley Arnold Hughes (5 October 1935 – 30 September 2022) was a lieutenant general in the United States Air Force who served as Deputy Chief of Staff plans and operations of the United States Air Force from 1985 to 1988. He was commissioned through ROTC at Oklahoma A&M University in 1957.

== Early life and career ==
General Hughes was born in 1935, in Adair, Okla., where he graduated from Adair High School in 1953. He received a bachelor of science degree from Oklahoma A&M College, Stillwater, in 1957 and was commissioned a second lieutenant through the Air Force Reserve Officer Training Corps program. He earned a bachelor of arts degree and a master of science degree from the University of Colorado, Boulder, in 1967. General Hughes completed Squadron Officer School in 1963, National War College in 1974 and the Industrial College of the Armed Forces in 1976.

He entered the U.S. Air Force in October 1957, began T-37 training at Bainbridge Air Base, Ga., and subsequently received his wings at Webb Air Force Base, Texas, in November 1959. After completing pilot training he attended the F-86L Interceptor School at Moody Air Force Base, Ga. From June 1960 until February 1966 General Hughes flew B-52G's at Blytheville Air Force Base, Ark.

After completing graduate degree requirements in June 1967, General Hughes received F-4 replacement training at George Air Force Base, Calif. He was then assigned to the 558th Tactical Fighter Squadron at Cam Ranh Bay Air Base, Republic of Vietnam, from March 1968 to April 1969. While there he flew 225 combat missions. Upon his return to the United States, General Hughes was assigned as a planning and programming officer in the Strategic Forces Division, Directorate of Plans, at Air Force headquarters. In August 1971 he became an air operations staff officer and, later, chief of strategic offensive forces, a position in which he served until August 1973, when he attended the National War College.

After graduation in June 1974, he assumed command of the 716th Bombardment Squadron at Kincheloe Air Force Base, Mich. In December 1974 he became deputy commander of the 449th Combat Support Group, also at Kincheloe, and in March 1975 he became the 449th Bombardment Wing deputy commander for operations.

From June 1976 to January 1978 he was assigned as a joint action planner in the Office of the Assistant Director for Joint Chiefs of Staff and National Security Matters in the Directorate of Plans at Air Force headquarters. General Hughes was then selected as the assistant director for the Joint Chiefs of Staff and national security matters. From September 1980 to July 1981 he served as deputy director for doctrine, strategy and plans integration, Directorate of Plans, Office of the Deputy Chief of Staff for Operations, Plans and Readiness. He was then named deputy director of plans.

He moved to Carswell Air Force Base, Texas, in October 1981 as commander of the 19th Air Division. In August 1982 he became deputy chief of staff for operations plans, Headquarters Strategic Air Command, and deputy director for the Single Integrated Operational Plan of the Joint Strategic Target Planning Staff, Offutt Air Force Base, Neb. In July 1984 he was assigned as the assistant deputy chief of staff for plans and operations at Air Force headquarters. He assumed his present duties in September 1985.

The general was a command pilot with 5,000 flying hours and 225 combat missions in Southeast Asia. His military decorations and awards include the Distinguished Service Medal, Silver Star, Defense Superior Service Medal, Distinguished Flying Cross with three oak leaf clusters, Meritorious Service Medal with oak leaf cluster, Air Medal with 11 oak leaf clusters, Air Force Commendation Medal with three oak leaf clusters, Presidential Unit Citation, Air Force Outstanding Unit Award with "V" device and oak leaf cluster, Combat Readiness Medal, National Defense Service Medal, Vietnam Service Medal with five oak leaf clusters, Air Force Longevity Service Award Ribbon with five oak leaf clusters, Small Arms Expert Marksmanship Ribbon, Republic of Vietnam Gallantry Cross with Palm and the Republic of Vietnam Campaign Medal.

He was promoted to lieutenant general Sept. 12, 1985, with same date of rank.

The avenue surrounded by Adair Public Schools in Adair, Oklahoma is named for him, the elementary school there is also named for his mother, Bernita, who was a former longtime teacher and principal there.

Hughes died on 30 September 2022 in Warrenton, Virginia and was buried at Arlington National Cemetery.
