= William Penn Adair =

Cherokee leader and Confederate colonel (1830–1880)

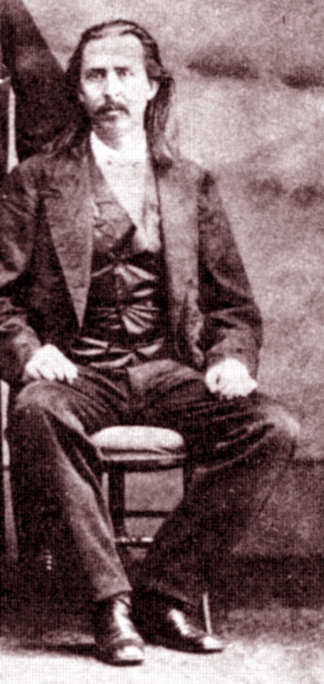
- William Penn Adair, 1866
- Born: April 15, 1830; New Echota, Georgia, U.S.
- Died: October 23, 1880 (aged 50); Washington, D.C., U.S.
- Burial place: Tahlequah City Cemetery, Tahlequah, Oklahoma, U.S.

William Penn Adair (April 15, 1830 – October 23, 1880) was a leader of the Cherokee Nation. He was born in the traditional Cherokee territory in Georgia. As a child with his family he survived the forced march on the Trail of Tears of Indian Removal from the Southeast to Indian Territory to what is now Oklahoma. He became an attorney who served in public office both before and after the American Civil War and as a justice of their nation's court. He entered the Confederate States Army, and he achieved the rank of colonel. Like many others, he joined on the promise that the Confederacy would support a Native American state if it won the War. He served as Cherokee Nation delegate at Washington, D.C. during the 1860s and 1870s.

== Background ==
William Penn Adair was born on April 15, 1830, in the old Cherokee Nation in New Echota, Georgia. His parents were George Washington Adair (1806-1862) and Martha (née Martin) Adair. The family was forced to remove to Indian Territory in 1838, a process which their people called the Trail of Tears, because of the loss of their lands and the high number of deaths along the way.

Adair attended Cherokee schools in Indian Territory, and studied law. He became a Freemason, belonging to the Vinita Lodge No. 5, which was chartered in 1875. He was described as being "six foot and two inches in height, magnetic, logical and frankly agreeable, the ablest and most brilliant of all Cherokees."

Adair married Sarah Ann McNair. After her death, he married again, to Susannah "Sue" McIntosh Drew. He lived on land along the Grand River in what is now Adair, Oklahoma. It was named for him.

== Military service ==
During the Civil War, Adair served in the Confederate States Army, first in the First Regiment of Cherokee Mounted Volunteers, under General Stand Watie. The Confederacy had promised the nations in Indian territory that it would support an Indian-controlled state if it won the war. Adair rose to the rank of colonel and organized the Second Cherokee Mounted Volunteers.

== Tribal leadership ==
Adair served the Cherokee Nation in many capacities. He was a senator, a justice of the Cherokee Supreme Court, delegate to Washington, DC, and assistant principal chief. He served as the Senator from the Flint District from 1855 to 1860 and Senator from the Saline District from 1869 to 1874. In 1879, he was elected as Assistant Chief. Throughout the 1860s and 1870s, Adair served as a delegate from the Cherokee Nation to Washington.

He was a vocal advocate for the rights of the Texas Cherokees. He served as Chairman of the Texas Cherokees and Affiliated (later Associate) Bands from 1871 until his death in 1880. During this period in 1873, he and Clement Neely Vann co-authored the book, History of the Claim of the Texas Cherokees, which they wrote on behalf of "the Texas Cherokees and Affiliated Bands."

The Texas Cherokee continued to seek compensation from the state of Texas for lands taken from them in 1839. Adair went to Washington to petition Congress to allow him to sue the state to return lands in Texas once belonging to Texas Cherokee people. In 1839, while the Republic of Texas was independent, President Mirabeau Lamar had forcibly driven most of the Texas Cherokee into Indian Territory and seized their lands in East Texas. The Texas Cherokees and Associate Bands sought the return of 1,500,000 acres (6,100 km^{2}) in East Texas. In the 1850s the state had offered lands in the Texas Panhandle in exchange, but Adair refused to accept that offer.

== Death and legacy ==
While in Washington, D.C., Adair died on October 23, 1880. He was initially buried in Arlington National Cemetery in Washington, D.C., but his body was soon thereafter transferred to the Tahlequah City Cemetery in Tahlequah, Oklahoma. This move was paid for by the Cherokee Nation.

Several Cherokee boys were named after him in the late 19th century, including the celebrated Cherokee humorist William Penn Adair Rogers (better known as Will Rogers). Adair, Oklahoma was named for William Penn Adair and his brother, Dr. Walter Thompson Adair. (Note: Adair's wife was known to Will Rogers as "Aunt Sue") In 1955, he was inducted into the Hall of Great Westerners of the National Cowboy & Western Heritage Museum.

== Sources ==
- Adair, William Penn and C. N. Vann. History of the Claim of the Texas Cherokees. New York: Morgan, Comes, and Lawrence, 1873.
- Littlefield, Daniel F., Jr. and James W. Parins. A Biobibliography of Native American Writers, 1772-1924: A Supplement. 1985. ISBN 0-8108-1802-7.
- Rogers, Will, Arthur Frank Wertheim, and Barbara Bair. The Papers of Will Rogers: From Vaudeville to Broadway: September 1908–August 1915. Norman: University of Oklahoma Press, 2001. ISBN 978-0-8061-3315-7.
- Starr, Emmett. History of the Cherokee Indians and Their Legends and Folklore, Oklahoma City: Warden Company, 1921.
- Wilson, J. G.; Fiske, J., eds. (1900). "Adair, William Penn" . Appletons' Cyclopædia of American Biography. New York: D. Appleton.
- Johnson, Rossiter, ed. (1906). "Adair, William P.". The Biographical Dictionary of America. Vol. 1. Boston: American Biographical Society. p. 34.
